= Timeline of the Iraqi insurgency (2013) =

== Chronology ==
=== January ===
- A car bombing in the central Iraqi city of Musayyib killed 28 Shi'ite pilgrims and injured 60 others as they were returning from Karbala. In the capital Baghdad, a roadside bomb exploded near a minibus, killing 4 pilgrims and leaving 15 wounded.
- A suicide bomber killed a prominent Sunni MP and six others in Fallujah on January 15, two days after Finance Minister Rafi al-Issawi survived an assassination attempt in the same city. The parliamentarian, Ayfan Sadoun al-Essawi, was an important member of the Sons of Iraq committee in Fallujah and part of the opposition to Prime Minister Nouri al-Maliki. On January 16, a suicide bomber detonated a truck full of explosives next to the headquarters of the Kurdistan Democratic Party in Kirkuk, killing 26 and leaving 204 injured. A similar attack against another Kurdish office in Tuz Khormato killed 5 and wounded 40. Roadside bombings and shootings in other areas, including Baghdad, Tikrit and Baiji, left at least 24 dead and 44 injured.
- A wave of attacks in and around Baghdad killed at least 26 and left 58 injured on January 22. Bombings and shootings took place in the capital, as well as Taji and Mahmoudiyah. On the next day, a suicide bomber blew himself up during a funeral for a politician's relative in the city of Tuz Khormato, killing 42 and leaving 75 others wounded. Other attacks across central and northern Iraq killed 7 people and injured 8 others.
- Ongoing protests by Sunni Muslims in Iraq against the government of Prime Minister Nouri al-Maliki turned deadly in Fallujah, as soldiers opened fire on a crowd of rock-throwing demonstrators, killing 7 and injuring more than 70 others. Three soldiers were later shot to death in retaliation for the incident, and clashes erupted in Askari, on the eastern outskirts of Fallujah. Security forces were placed on high alert as a curfew and vehicle ban were brought into effect. In a statement, Maliki urged both sides to show restraint and blamed the incident on unruly protesters. He also warned that it could lead to a "rise in tension that al-Qaida and terrorist groups are trying to take advantage of".

=== February ===
- A suicide car bomber detonated his vehicle near the provincial police headquarters in Kirkuk, killing at least 36 and injuring 105 others. Among the wounded was Major General Jamal Tahir, the city's chief of police, who had survived a previous attack at almost the same spot 2 years earlier. Three additional attackers were killed after the initial blast, as they attempted to throw grenades at security forces. Several officers who survived the attack reported that the first bomber was driving a police car and wearing a uniform. When guards at the gate stopped him to check his credentials, he detonated his explosives.

=== March ===
- Unidentified gunmen ambushed a Syrian Army convoy escorted by Iraqi soldiers in the Battle of Akashat, killing 48 Syrians and 13 Iraqis. The assault took place near the desert border between the two nations in Iraq's Al Anbar Governorate. Authorities suspected the Free Iraqi Army, Jabhat al-Nusra, or al-Qaeda in Iraq of being behind the attack. A week later, on March 11, the Islamic State of Iraq claimed responsibility for the attack, stating that they had "annihilated" a "column of the Safavid army," a reference to the Shia Persian dynasty that ruled Iran from 1501 to 1736. The group also claimed that the presence of Syrian soldiers in Iraq showed "firm co-operation" between the Syrian and Iraqi governments.
- A series of coordinated attacks across the capital Baghdad and several major cities in the north and central parts of the country killed at least 98 people and left 240 others injured. The wave of violence was directed mostly at Shia civilians and took place on the tenth anniversary of the beginning of the Iraq War. The Islamic State of Iraq later claimed responsibility for the attacks.

=== April ===
- A tanker bomb exploded at the police headquarters in Tikrit, killing at least 42 people and injuring 67 others. Insurgents attacked an oil field near Akaz in a remote part of Al Anbar Governorate, killing 2 engineers and kidnapping a third one. Other attacks across the country left a prison warden in Mosul dead and 11 others injured, including the mayor of Tuz Khormato and at least four journalists, who were stabbed by unknown assailants in a series of attacks on media offices in the capital Baghdad.
- A suicide bomber killed 22 and injured 55 at a political rally for a local Sunni candidate in Baqubah. Other attacks across the country killed 7 and injured 9 others, most of them members of the security forces.
- series of coordinated attacks across more than 20 cities killed at least 75 people and left more than 350 others injured just days before the provincial elections.
- On April 23, Iraqi Army units moved against an encampment set up by protesters in Hawija, west of the city of Kirkuk, sparking deadly clashes and reprisal attacks across the country. According to army officers, the operation was aimed at Sunni militants from the Naqshbandi Army, who were reportedly involved in the protests. A total of 42 people were killed and 153 others injured, with most of them being protesters - only 3 soldiers were confirmed dead and 7 others wounded. The incident sparked a number of revenge attacks, that soon spread out across much of the country. Minister of Education Mohammed Tamim resigned from his post in response to the Army's operation, and was followed later by Science and Technology Minister Abd al-Karim al-Samarrai. Insurgents from the Naqshbandi Army completely captured the town of Sulaiman Bek, about 170 km north of Baghdad, after heavy fighting with security forces on April 25, only to relinquish control of it a day later, while escaping with weapons and vehicles. More than 340 were killed and 600 others injured in the four days of heaviest violence, while attacks continued after that at a pace higher than earlier in the year.

=== May ===
- On May 3, the United Nations mission to Iraq released figures, showing that more people died in violent attacks in April than in any other month since June 2008. According to the numbers, at least 712 were killed during April, including 117 members of the security forces.
- In the latest round of violence, a series of deadly bombings and shootings struck the central and northern parts of Iraq, with a few incidents occurring in towns in the south and far west as well. The week of attacks killed at least 449 people and left 732 others injured in one of the deadliest outbreaks of violence in years.
- The Iraqi government launches Operation al-Shabah ('Phantom'), with the stated aim of severing contact between al-Qaeda in Iraq and the Syrian al-Nusra Front by clearing militants from the border area with Syria and Jordan.
- A series of coordinated attacks took place in Baghdad, killing 71 people and injuring more than 220 others.

=== June ===
- A series of bombings and shootings struck the central and northern parts of Iraq, killing at least 94 people and injuring almost 300 others.
- A series of deadly attacks across Iraq killed at least 54 people and injured more than 170 others, with most of the major bombings taking place in the country's south.

=== September ===
- September 21 – A series of car and suicide bombings struck a funeral in the predominantly Shi'ite neighborhood of Sadr City, in Iraq's capital Baghdad. The attacks left at least 78 dead and more than 200 others injured. A number of smaller incidents occurred in the country's north and central regions as well.

=== November ===
- November 1 – Attacks and other violence across Iraq killed 979 people in October, the United Nations said Friday, a monthly death toll that is the same as the figure for September. UN's report said 979 people were killed in October—the same number as in September. Out of those, 852 were civilians while 127 were Iraqi soldiers and members of the police force. Also, the U.N. said 1,902 Iraqis were wounded in attacks across the country last month—a drop of more than 200 from September, when 2,133 Iraqi were wounded. Baghdad was the worst affected province, with 411 killed and 925 wounded. It was followed by the volatile Ninevah province, where 188 people were killed and 294 were wounded.

=== December ===
- December 1 – Health Minister of Iraq and the Defence Minister of Iraq said 948 people, including 852 civilians, 53 police officers and 43 soldiers, had been killed in violent attacks across the country in November. The figures make November one of the deadliest months in 2013, with civilians accounting for about 90 percent of the fatalities.
- December 4 – Two people were killed and 70 others were wounded due to a clash between security forces and assailants who tried to capture the intelligence building in Iraq's Kirkuk Governorate. Meanwhile, a car bomb was detonated by security forces in front of the intelligence building. Five assailants tried to prevent the assistance provided to security forces and wounded four ambulance drivers.
- December 8 – Car bombs killed at least 39 people across Iraq on Sunday and wounded more than 120, mainly targeting busy commercial streets in and around the capital, police sources said.
- December 9 – The deadliest of Monday's attacks took place outside a cafe in the town of Buhriz, about 60 kilometers (35 miles) north of the capital, Baghdad, killing 12 people and wounding 24, police said. Three more bombings around the country killed an additional six people. A roadside bomb targeted an army patrol just south of the capital, killing one Iraqi soldier and wounded two others, while in Baghdad's eastern Basmaya district a bomb at an outdoor market killed three people and wounded seven, police said. In a village just north of Baghdad, three policemen were killed and 10 were wounded when a car bomb exploded near their checkpoint. And in the southwestern suburbs of Baghdad, a roadside bomb struck a car carrying anti-al-Qaida Sunni fighters, killing two and wounding three, police and hospital officials said.
- December 10 – At least 18 people have been killed in two deadly attacks, including a bombing and a shooting, in Iraq's Diyala Governorate. The deadliest attack took place on Tuesday in Baquba where a bomb blast left eleven people dead. Reports say that the explosion also left 19 people injured.
- December 10 – The country's ministries of health and defense said that 948 people, including 852 civilians, 53 police officers and 43 soldiers, were killed in violent attacks across the Arab country in November. Another 1,349 people were also injured in the attacks. The figures make November one of the deadliest months in 2013, with civilians accounting for about 90 percent of the fatalities.
- December 14 – At least 17 people, most of them Shi'ite Muslims, were killed in a series of bombings and shootings across Iraq on December 14 ahead of a major Shi'ite ritual, according to medical and police sources. Police and medics said the deadliest of the attacks occurred in Baghdad's mainly Shi'ite district of Bayaa when a car bomb blew up near a gathering of Shi'ite pilgrims, killing seven people and wounding another 16. Additionally, police also reported that three people were killed and ten wounded in a mainly Shi'ite district on the southeastern outskirts of Baghdad when a roadside bomb exploded in a vegetable market, while in the district of Husseiniya, a bomb left inside a restaurant killed two people and wounded another five.
- December 15 – Police reported that seven people were killed, including five family members, in separate attacks in Iraq. A provincial police source also reported that earlier in the day, a government employee, his wife and three of their children were killed when bombs planted in their house exploded in the city of Saadiyah, some 120 km northeast of the Iraqi capital of Baghdad. The provincial source also stated that, in a separate incident, a member of a government-backed Sahwa paramilitary group was shot dead at a village near the Diyala Governorate capital city of Baqubah, some 65 km. northeast of Baghdad.
- December 16 – According to police officers, militants detonated a car bomb at the city council headquarters in Iraq's Tikrit and then occupied the building. The officers said an unknown number of employees were still in the building at the time of the explosion in the city north of Baghdad, while the number of casualties remains unclear. Iraqi security forces surrounded the building and released 40 people who were held inside, according to Counter-Terrorism Service spokesman, Sabah Noori. Meanwhile, a police major and a doctor said a city council member as well as two police died in the incident. In clashes that erupted afterwards between the militants and Iraqi security forces, three policemen lost their lives while three militants were also killed. In a separate incident, gunmen killed three soldiers guarding an oil pipeline near Tikrit. In another deadly attack on Monday, militants gunned down 12 people on a bus in the city of Mosul in northern Iraq. Also on Monday, five car bombs and a magnetic "sticky bomb" on a vehicle went off in and around the Iraqi capital, leaving at least 17 people dead and over 40 injured.
- December 17 – Iraqi security officials reported that militants killed at least eight Shiite pilgrims in Baghdad Governorate. A suicide bomber detonated explosives among pilgrims walking south of Baghdad, killing four, while militants in a car threw a hand grenade at pilgrims in the capital, killing at least four others. The two attacks also wounded at least 27 other people.
- December 18 – A suicide bomber detonated an explosives belt among Shiite pilgrims walking northeast of the Iraqi capital, one of several attacks that killed a total of nine people Wednesday, officials said. The bomber struck in the Khales area, killing five people and wounding 10, a police colonel and a doctor said. The colonel said one of the dead was a policeman tasked with guarding the pilgrims, who embraced the bomber just before the attack in an effort to shield others from the blast.
- December 19 – Three suicide bombers detonated explosives belts among Shiite pilgrims in Iraq on Thursday, killing at least 36 people, while militants shot dead a family of five, officials said. The deadliest attack hit the Dura area of south Baghdad, where a bomber targeted pilgrims at a tent where they are served food and drinks on their way to the shrine city of Karbala, killing at least 20 people and wounding at least 40. Among those killed in the blast was Mohanad Mohammed, a journalist who had worked for both foreign and Iraqi media, one of his sons told AFP.
- December 20 – Two bombings in an Iraqi market and another in a cemetery as people buried victims of the first blasts killed 11 people on Friday, police and a doctor said. The first two attacks targeting a livestock market in Tuz Khurmatu, 175 kilometres (110 miles) north of Baghdad, killed eight people and wounded 25. As people gathered at a cemetery to bury the victims of the market blasts, another bomb went off, killing three people and wounding two.
- December 21 – Officials say attacks in western Iraq and south of Baghdad have killed six people – four policemen and two Shiite pilgrims. Police officials say gunmen in a speeding car opened fire at a police checkpoint in the western city of Fallujah on Saturday morning, killing four policemen, while in the town of Latifiyah, 30 kilometers (20 miles) south of Baghdad, a mortar shell hit a group of Shiite pilgrims heading to the holy sites in the city of Karbala. Also, military sources said at least 15 Iraqi military officers were killed in an ambush on Saturday in western Iraq's Sunni Muslim-dominated Al Anbar Governorate. According to the sources, several top-ranking officers were among those killed in the attack.
- December 23 – The Iraqi military attacked camps belonging to an Al-Qaeda-linked militant group in Al Anbar Governorate, destroying two, the defence ministry said on Monday. After locating camps with aircraft, Iraqi forces launched "successful strikes ... resulting in the destruction of two camps in the desert of Anbar Province," spokesman Mohammed al-Askari said in a statement. The assaults came after five senior officers, including a divisional commander, and 10 soldiers were killed during an operation against militants in the mainly Sunni western Anbar Governorate.
- December 25 – Three bombings in Baghdad targeted Christians at Christmas, killing 38 people and wounding 70 others, including a car bomb that exploded as worshippers were leaving a Christmas service. Elsewhere in Iraq, at least 10 people were killed in three attacks that targeted police and Shi'ite pilgrims, police said.
- December 28 – Twelve people were killed and 27 wounded in Iraq in violent attacks and an operation by security forces to arrest a Sunni lawmaker, police said. In an incident, up to five were killed and 17 wounded in a clash between Iraqi security forces and guards of Ahmad al-Alwani, a Sunni Arab member of parliament in Iraq's western Al Anbar Governorate. The incident occurred when a joint army and a Special Weapons And Tactics force, backed by helicopters, carried out a pre-dawn raid on the house of Alwani in the provincial capital city of Ramadi, some 110 km west of Baghdad. During the operation, the troops exchanged fire with Alwani's guards who resist the arrest and called the operation illegal since lawmakers enjoy immunity under the constitution.

"The clashes resulted in the killing of five people, including Alwani's brother and a soldier, and the wounding of 13 guards and four soldiers," the source said, adding that Alwani and a number of his guards were also arrested.
Later in the day, the Defence Minister of Iraq said in a statement that the troops went to Alwani's house with an arrest warrant against his brother, who was among the killed, and they arrested Ahmad al-Alwani despite his immunity.

- December 29 – Attacks in Iraq mainly targeting members of the security forces killed at least 16 people on Sunday, among them three senior army officers, security and medical officials said. Earlier on Sunday, a car bomb exploded near an army checkpoint in Mosul, killing four more soldiers, among them an officer, while a roadside bomb in the city killed a child and wounded three people. The attacks on the soldiers come after five senior officers, including a divisional commander, and 10 other soldiers were killed during a December 21 operation against militants in the western Al Anbar Governorate. In Abu Ghraib, west of Baghdad, gunmen killed at least four Sahwa militia anti-Al-Qaeda militiamen and wounded at least three at a checkpoint on Sunday.
