= July 2013 Iraq attacks =

Terrorist incident in Iraq

- Part of Iraqi insurgency (post-U.S. withdrawal)
- Location: across Iraq (see maps below)
- Date: 2 July 2013; 11–14 July 2013
- Target: Shia and Sunni civilians, Iraqi security forces (Iraqi Army and Iraqi Police), Sahwa militias
- Attack type: Car bombings, suicide bombings, roadside bombings, shootings
- Weapons: Car bombs; IEDs; Sticky bombs; Automatic weapons
- Deaths: 86 (2 July); 96 (11 July); 84 (12 July); 46 (13 July); 77 (14 July); Total: 389 killed
- Injuries: 234 (2 July); 191 (11 July); 77 (12 July); 106 (13 July); 223 (14 July); Total: 831 injured

During the first two weeks of July 2013, a series of coordinated bombings and shootings struck across several cities in Iraq, killing at least 389 people and injuring more than 800 others.

== Background ==
From a peak of 3,000 deaths per month in 2006–07, violence in Iraq decreased steadily for several years before beginning to rise again in 2012. In December 2012, Sunnis began to protest perceived mistreatment by the Shia-led government. The protests had been largely peaceful, but insurgents, emboldened by the war in neighboring Syria, stepped up attacks in the initial months of 2013. The number of attacks rose sharply after the Iraqi army raided a protest camp in Hawija on 23 April 2013. Overall, 712 people were killed in April according to UN figures, making it the nation's deadliest month in five years. Conditions continued to deteriorate in May when UNAMI reported at least 1,045 Iraqis were killed and another 2,397 wounded in acts of terrorism and acts of violence, making it the deadliest month in the country since April 2008.

The attacks during the month of July occurred as Iraq was still dealing with the aftermath of the country's deadliest week in almost 5 years, as a series of deadly bombings and shootings across the country killed at least 449 people and left 732 others injured between 15 May and 21 May.

== Attacks ==
Locations of some of the attacks on 2 July

=== 2 July attacks ===
A number of coordinated bombings struck the capital Baghdad, where a large part of the day's casualties were recorded. Twin blasts in the Shabb neighborhood killed 9 and wounded 24, while a similar pair of attacks killed 12 and injured 38 at a market in Shula. A car bombing in Hurriyah left three dead and 14 others injured. Two bombings in Abu Dsher and another in Aden killed 6 and wounded at least 25 others. Car bombs struck Kamaliya, Doura and Amiriya, killing a total of 11 people and injuring 43 others. Unidentified gunmen shot three people dead at a pet food store in Zaafaraniya, while a sticky bomb killed a university professor nearby. A barber and a physician were also reported killed in separate attacks. In nearby Abu Ghraib, a car bombing at a market killed 3 and wounded 14, while a sticky bomb killed a Sahwa member and left two others wounded.

Four people were reported killed after gunmen armed with automatic weapons opened fire on a cafe in Saidiyah. Another four were killed and 17 injured when a bomb exploded during a funeral in Hibhib. A roadside blast in Kirkuk killed a civilian and injured another, while in Fallujah gunmen assassinated Iraq's bodybuilding champion and another blast injured 3 civilians. Iraqi Army forces killed two militants during an operation near Mutaibijh.

In the northern city of Mosul, four Iraqi Army soldiers were killed and four others injured during clashes with insurgents in the western parts of town. A roadside bombing injured two civilians, while two others were killed and a police officer injured in a separate blast. Clashes also took place near the border with Syria, with gunmen battling police forces near Al-Ba'aj. Four officers and seven attackers were reported killed, with another five policemen injured. In Tal Afar, security forces killed a suicide bomber before he could detonate his explosive vest.

In addition to these, a few rare attacks were reported from Iraq's south, where the levels of violence are much lower than the rest of the country. A bombing in Samawah killed 3 and wounded 20 others, and a similar attack in Amarah left 2 dead and 19 injured. Another blast in the port city of Basra injured three bystanders.

=== Mid-July violence ===
After a week without any major series of attacks, violence once again erupted on 11 July, with at least 96 people reported killed and 191 others injured across the country. The deadliest incident took place near Barwana, across the Euphrates river from Haditha, where insurgents attacked an Iraqi Army checkpoint, killing 3 soldiers and injuring 4 others. The attackers then proceeded to a nearby trailer, where they killed 11 members of the special Oil Protection Police, who were breaking their Ramadan fast at the end of the day. In Muqdadiyah, a suicide bomber attacked a funeral procession, killing 12 people and injuring 30 others. A separate bombing in the city injured three civilians. Gunmen attacked an Army checkpoint in Ramadi, killing 7 soldiers and injuring 14 others, while three suicide bombers detonated their vests near a police station, killing two policemen and wounding 4 others. Roadside blasts injured two more police officers. Twin blasts killed 10 and wounded 18 others at a coffee shop in Yathrib. A car bombing in Tuz Khormato also killed 10 and injured 21 others, most of them ethnic Turkmen. A bombing in Tikrit killed three civilians and injured at least 10 others. In the former insurgent stronghold Fallujah, a car bombing killed six people, including four policemen, and left 14 others injured. At least 40 gunmen were involved in clashes with security forces, forcing the Army to temporarily shut down the entrances to the city.

In the capital Baghdad attacks were few, with two car bombings in Doura and Karrada killing 3 police officers and injuring 11 other people. A civilian was gunned down by unknown assailants in the Shirqat neighborhood. Twin suicide bombers struck in the northern city of Mosul, killing at least 7 policemen and injuring more 18 others, including civilians. A soldier, a police officer, and a civilian were also reported killed in separate shootings. In Qa'im, twin bombs killed a policeman and wounded two others, while a suicide bomber killed another officer and wounded two others in Rutbah. Two Sahwa members were killed in a roadside blast near Shirqat. Similar incidents in Debs, Kirkuk, Samarra and Khan Bani Saad injured a total of 28 people. Also in Samarra, a car bombing at a checkpoint killed 4 soldiers and injured 5 others. Gunmen killed two policemen in Qadisiyah. A grenade was thrown at the home of a provincial council member in Hammam al-Alil, injuring him. Mortar fire and car bombings took place in Baiji, though no casualties were reported.

On 12 July, a suicide bomber attacked a restaurant in Kirkuk shortly after the Iftar meal that marks the end of fasting for the day during Ramadan. The explosion killed 38 people and left 29 others injured. A twin bombing in Dujail killed 11 people and injured 25 others late on the previous night. In Mosul, two bombings killed 5 policemen and injured 3 others, while a sticky bomb killed a civilian. The casualties from the double suicide blast on the previous day rose by 14 killed and 6 wounded.

A number of attacks on 12 July targeted members of the Sons of Iraq. Two were killed and another injured during clashes in Tikrit that also left two attackers dead. Roadside blasts killed three others and injured a civilian near Baqubah and Rashad. Another blast in Shirqat killed two Sahwa members and injured three others, while gunmen shot dead a police brigadier general. Gunmen also killed a religious official in Baghdad and a retired police officer in Muqdadiyah. Roadside bombings in Madain and Amiriyah Fallujah killed a civilian and left 7 others wounded. Mortar fire injured two people in Fallujah itself.

Locations of some of the deadliest attacks (11–14 July)

Attacks continued to be spread out on 13 July, as 46 were killed and 106 injured across Iraq. A car bomb was detonated at a mosque in Baghdad's Doura neighborhood late in the evening, killing 16 and injuring 27 others. An earlier blast at a soccer field in Jamiaa had killed 7 and left 11 others wounded. A suicide bomber attacked a funeral in Abarra, killing 4 policemen and a civilian, while injuring 11 other people. Bombings in Madain, Muqdadiyah and Baqubah killed a total of 8 people and wounded 23 others. A border guard was killed and at least 5 others injured after clashes broke out when gunmen tried to enter Iraq from neighboring Syria. Near Kirkuk, gunmen killed a soldier and injured another, while two a roadside blast injured two of their colleagues. Seven more people were reported injured in the previous day's suicide bombing. Smaller bombings took place in Qayara, Abu Ghraib, Al-Karmah, Hib Hib, Iskandariyah, Wadi Hajar and Amiriyah Fallujah – at least 2 were killed and 16 others injured. Gunmen shot dead a vacationing lieutenant in Mosul, as well as two civilians in Musayyib and Tal Abta. A bomb exploded in front of the Turkish Airlines office in Basra, causing damage but no casualties.

Bakeries and restaurants packed with people at the end of the day's fasting were again the preferred target on 14 July, as another series of attacks spread across Iraq. A blast ripped through a bakery in Kirkuk, killing at least 11 civilians and injuring 68 others. Angry residents threw shoes and rocks at the provincial governor when he arrived to inspect the scene of the attack. Twelve people were killed and 25 others injured in a suicide bombing near a mosque in Musayyib. Three separate blasts struck near political offices in Basra, killing 9 and injuring 35 others. Also in the south, five were killed and 22 injured after a bomb tore through a marketplace in Nassiriyah, while a similar attack near a shrine in Kerbala killed 9 and wounded 22 others. In Mosul, bombings killed 8 people, including 6 police officers, and injured 3 others. Gunmen shot dead two policemen and two soldiers in separate attacks within the city. In the capital Baghdad, twin roadside blasts killed 8 civilians and left 28 others wounded. Gunmen shot dead two police officers and two civilians and injured three others. Similar attacks in Tikrit and Kirkuk left 6 Iraqi Army soldiers dead and 6 others injured. Roadside bombs in Salman Pak, Saniya, Hillah and Baqubah killed four people and left 12 others injured. A suicide bomber was the only casualty during an attack in Suwayra, while a government employee was injured by a sticky bomb in Samarra. Several people were reported injured after twin car bombings in the town of Dhi Qar. 14 July also marked the 55th anniversary of the coup which installed the former regime and Saddam Hussein in power.

== See also ==
- List of terrorist incidents, July–December 2013
- 2012–2013 Iraqi protests
