= 15 April 2013 Iraq attacks =

Attacks in Iraq during the post-U.S. insurgency

- Part of Iraqi insurgency (post-U.S. withdrawal)
- Location: Across Iraq
- Date: 15 April 2013
- Target: Shia and Sunni civilians, Iraqi security forces
- Attack type: Car bombings, suicide bombings, roadside bombings, shootings
- Weapons: Car bombs; IEDs; Automatic weapons
- Deaths: 75
- Injuries: 356

A wave of bombings and shootings across Iraq killed at least 75 people and injured more than 356 others on 15 April. The attacks came just days before the provincial elections which was held on 20 April.

== Background ==
Violence in Iraq had decreased since its peak in 2006–07, but attacks remained common. Deaths rose in 2012 for the first time in three years.

In the months leading up to the 20 April provincial elections, the first since the withdrawal of US forces in 2011, tensions were high in Iraq as Sunni groups claimed they were being marginalized by Prime Minister Nouri al-Maliki's Shiite dominated government. A number of large scale attacks linked to the Sunni umbrella group Islamic State of Iraq were carried out in early 2013 in an attempt to destabilize the country ahead of the elections. At least fourteen election candidates have been murdered, while Anbar and Nineveh provinces have postponed elections because of security concerns. Four other provinces are not scheduled to hold elections on 20 April.

== Attacks ==
Locations of some of the attacks

The series of attacks began during the morning early rush hour and encompassed more than 40 incidents in and around 20 cities, the majority of them being car bombings. Both Sunni and Shia areas were targeted in the attacks. Initially no group claimed responsibility for the wave of violence.

In the capital Baghdad, two car bombs exploded at a heavily guarded checkpoint at the entrance to Baghdad International Airport, killing 3 and injuring 16 others. A blast in Kamaliyah killed 4 and injured 13, while a bombing at a market and a bus station in Umm al-Maalif killed 4 and injured 15. Twin blasts in Habibiya and Karrada killed 4 and injured 24 others, while a car bomb in Shurta killed 2 and injured 9. A roadside bombing wounded 5 policemen in Baladiyat.

In the ethnically divided city of Kirkuk, a series of six car bombs left 9 people dead and 79 others injured. The attacks took place in three different neighborhoods in the center of the city – one predominantly Arab, one Kurdish, and one Turkmen. Militants also shot and injured a local doctor. At least three car bombs exploded in Tuz Khurmatu, a city at 170 kilometres (110 mi) north of Baghdad, killing six and leaving 67 others injured. In Mosul, unidentified gunmen shot and killed a married couple and another civilian. A soldier was killed in another shootout with suspected insurgents, while 3 police officers and 2 civilians were injured in roadside bombings. An additional bombing inside the city resulted in no casualties. A bombing at a local political office in Tikrit killed 4 and wounded 3 others, while a later blast at a checkpoint injured 13 policemen. A blast in Ad-Dawr also injured 13 people, while 7 others were wounded after a bombing at a politician's home in a village in Saladin Governorate.

In the town of Tarmiyah, 50 kilometres (31 mi) north of Baghdad, gunmen shot and killed a police officer. Another officer was killed by a sticky bomb in Buhriz. A roadside bombing in Al Khalis killed a young child and injured 8 others. A car bombing in Muqdadiyah injured seven people. Five people were wounded in two separate blasts in Baqubah, including two policemen. A roadside bomb injured a civilian on a rural road outside Khan Bani Saad. A bombing in Tal Abta killed a police officer and injured two others. Unidentified gunmen killed a captain and injured 2 soldiers in Sabeen, as well as a young man in Shirqat.

In Fallujah, a suicide car bomber killed 2 policemen and injured 6 others at a checkpoint, while a sticky bomb killed 2 civilians. Unidentified gunmen shot dead another civilian, while a bombing south of the city resulted in no casualties. A blast in Ramadi targeted a local Sunni cleric, killing 2 of his bodyguards and injuring another. At least 19 civilians were injured in two car bombs that struck near Hillah in Iraq's Babil Governorate.

In the southern city of Nasiriyah a car bomb was detonated near a market, killing 2 and injuring 14 others.

On 16 April police officials in Kirkuk announced they had arrested a group of five individuals who were involved in the bombings in that city. Another eight people suspected of involvement were arrested by a joint army and police force in Diyala Governorate. Elsewhere, the violence continued. In Aziziyah, a city 75 kilometres (47 mi) south of Baghdad a car bomb killed at least four people on 16 April, and left 15 others injured. In Mussayib, another southern city, a roadside bomb killed a soldier and injured two other people. Another bomb killed a civilian and wounded two others north of Baghdad. Three injuries were also reported in Tarmiyah.

== Reactions ==
=== Domestic ===
- (Iraq) Sadrist Movement – A statement released by Muqtada al-Sadr condemned the attacks, but also accused the current cabinet of not doing enough to protect civilians and being too preoccupied with campaigning for the upcoming elections.

=== International ===
- European Union – High Representative Catherine Ashton released a statement, condemning "in the strongest terms" the series of attacks, as well as the recent spate of violence targeting local politicians and election candidates.
- France – Foreign Ministry spokesman Philippe Lalliot offered condolences to the victims and "strongly condemned" the attacks in a briefing, while reaffirming France's position on national unity and a rejection of violence.
- Iran – A Foreign Ministry spokesman condemned the attacks.
- Japan – Foreign Ministry Press Secretary Yutaka Yokoi released a statement, condemning the "atrocious acts of terrorism" and offering condolences to the people affected. The statement added that Japan hopes the Iraqi government and its people can "tackle their domestic problems through further progress in national reconciliation" despite the attacks.
- Lebanon – Speaker of the Parliament Nabih Berri phoned Prime Minister al-Maliki and "expressed condemnation" at the series of attacks across Iraq.
- Turkey – The Foreign Ministry issued a statement, condemning the attacks.

== See also ==
- List of terrorist incidents, January–June 2013
