= List of terrorist incidents in 2013 =

This is a list of terrorist incidents which took place in 2013, including attacks by violent non-state actors for political motives. Note that terrorism related to drug wars and cartel violence is not included in these lists. Ongoing military conflicts are listed separately.

== Guidelines ==
- To be included, entries must be notable (have a stand-alone article) and described by a consensus of reliable sources as "terrorism".
- List entries must comply with the guidelines outlined in the manual of style under MOS:TERRORIST.
- Casualty figures in this list are the total casualties of the incident including immediate casualties and later casualties (such as people who succumbed to their wounds long after the attacks occurred).
- Casualties listed are the victims. Perpetrator casualties are listed separately (e.g. x (+y) indicate that x victims and y perpetrators were killed/injured).
- Casualty totals may be underestimated or unavailable due to a lack of information. A figure with a plus (+) sign indicates that at least that many people have died (e.g. 10+ indicates that at least 10 people have died) – the actual toll could be considerably higher. A figure with a plus (+) sign may also indicate that over that number of people are victims.
- If casualty figures are 20 or more, they will be shown in **bold**. In addition, figures for casualties more than 50 will also be **underlined**.
- Incidents are limited to one per location per day. If multiple attacks occur in the same place on the same day, they will be merged into a single incident.

== List ==
Date	Type	Dead	Injured	Location	Article	Details	Perpetrator	Part of
Jan 10	Suicide bombings, bombing	126	270+	Various locations in Pakistan	January 2013 Pakistan bombings: A string of bombings hit the country. A bombing at a crowded market in Quetta killed 12 and injured 47 in an attack claimed by a Balochistan separatist group. Later, twin blasts took place in quick succession at a snooker hall. A total of 92 people were killed in these attacks, including 9 policemen, 25 rescue workers and 3 journalists who perished in the second one. In addition, an explosion at a Tableeghi Jamaat seminary in the Swat Valley, outside of Saidu Sharif, killed 22 people and wounded 60.	Lashkar-e-Jhangvi		
Jan 15	Rocket attacks	82	160	Aleppo, Syria	Aleppo University bombings: Two explosions struck between the Aleppo University halls of residence and the faculty of architecture as students were gathering for the first day of exams. The Syrian government accused rebels of firing a surface-to-air missile, while opposition activists said government jets bombed the campus.			
Jan 16–19	Shooting, hostage crisis	69	unknown	In Aménas, Algeria	In Amenas hostage crisis: Militants under the command of Mokhtar Belmokhtar took more than 800 people hostage at a remote gas facility, leading to a tense 4-day standoff with the Algerian Army and at least 2 assaults. At least 40 hostages and 29 militants were killed, while 685 Algerian workers and 107 foreigners were freed.	Al-Qaeda in the Islamic Maghreb		
Feb 2	Suicide bombing	1	1	Ankara, Turkey	2013 United States embassy bombing in Ankara: A suicide bombing in front of the US embassy killed a security guard and injured a journalist.	RPLP-F		
Feb 16	Bombing	84	190	Quetta, Pakistan	February 2013 Quetta bombing: A bomb attached to a motorbike exploded at a market in Hazara Town on the outskirts of Quetta. Most of the victims were members of the predominantly Twelver Shia minority.	Lashkar-e-Jhangvi		
Feb 21	Car bombings	83	250+	Damascus, Syria	February 2013 Damascus bombings: A car bomb exploded next to the Ba'ath Party offices, killing 61 and injuring more than 200. The attack killed mostly civilians. In addition, three bombings killed 22 and injured 50 in the suburb of Barzeh. Most of the victims were government soldiers.	Al-Nusra Front Suspected		
Feb 21	Bombings	17	119	Hyderabad, India	2013 Hyderabad blasts: Two blasts occurred at crowded intersections.	Indian Mujahideen Suspected		
Mar 3	Car bombings	48	180	Karachi, Pakistan	March 2013 Karachi bombing: Twin bombings struck Shi'ite faithful as they were leaving a prayer hall.			
Mar 4	Ambush	64	10	Akashat, Iraq	Akashat ambush: Gunmen ambushed a Syrian Army convoy escorted by Iraqi soldiers, killing 51 Syrians and 13 Iraqis near the border between the two nations.	Islamic State of Iraq		
Mar 13	Bombings, shootings	5	10	Srinagar, India	March 2013 Srinagar attack: Two gunmen assaulted a CRPF camp in Jammu and Kashmir.	Hizbul Mujahideen or Lashkar-e-Taiba		
Mar 18	Suicide bombing	41	44	Kano, Nigeria	2013 Kano bus bombing: A suicide bomber attacked a bus station in a predominantly Christian area of Kano.			
Mar 19	Bombings, shootings	98	240	across Iraq	19 March 2013 Iraq attacks: A series of coordinated bombings and shootings across central and northern Iraq on the 10th anniversary of the beginning of the Iraq War. At least 61 were killed and 148 wounded in Baghdad, where most of the major attacks took place.	Islamic State of Iraq		
Apr 12	Suicide bombing	4	8	Kidal, Mali	2013 Kidal suicide attack: Two suicide bombers detonated their explosive belts at a market, killing 4 Chadian soldiers.	MOJWA		
Apr 15	Bombings, shootings	75	356	across Iraq	15 April 2013 Iraq attacks: A string of attacks across Iraq which began with 8 bombings in Baghdad that killed 30 and wounded 92. Attacks also took place in Kirkuk, Baqubah, Tikrit, Fallujah, Nassiriyah and Mussayab, among others.			
Apr 15	Bombing	4	264	Boston, United States	Boston Marathon bombing: Two bombs were detonated near the finish line of the 2013 Boston Marathon. One suspect was killed during a shootout with police in Watertown, Massachusetts in the early hours of April 19, while the other suspect, his brother, was arrested nearby about 18 hours later. The two also shot and killed a police officer in Cambridge prior to the police chase.	Dzhokhar Tsarnaev and Tamerlan Tsarnaev		
Apr 16	Bombing	0	16	Bangalore, India	2013 Bangalore bombing: A bomb placed on a motorcycle exploded next to the offices of the opposition Bharatiya Janata Party.			
Apr 23–26	Bombings, shootings	331+	577+	across Iraq	2013 Hawija clashes: On April 23, an Iraqi Army raid against a protest encampment in the city of Hawija, west of Kirkuk, led to dozens of civilian deaths and to several insurgent groups and local tribal militias attacking security forces across the country.	Islamic State of Iraq, Naqshbandi Army, Sons of Iraq, Iraqi Army, Iraqi Police		
Apr 29	Stabbing	1	0	Birmingham, United Kingdom	Part of 4 attacks by Pavlo Lapshyn, a white supremacist. 82-year-old Mohammed Saleem, a Birmingham resident, was stabbed to death. Lapshyn later went on a campaign of bombing attempts at mosques in the West Midlands.	Pavlo Lapshyn		
May 15–21	Bombings, shootings	449	732	across Iraq	May 2013 Iraq attacks: A series of deadly bombings and shootings across central and northern Iraq over a period of seven days. The deadliest incident was a blast at a Sunni mosque in Baqubah on May 17 that killed 43 and injured 80 others.	Islamic State of Iraq Suspected		
May 22	Knife attack	1	2	Woolwich, United Kingdom	Murder of Lee Rigby: Soldier and drummer Lee Rigby was knocked down by a car, after which the 2 occupants attacked him with knives and a machete, almost decapitating him and dumping the body on the road. The attackers were later injured in a shootout with security forces and arrested.	Lone wolves		
May 26	Ambush	27	32	Chhattisgarh, India	2013 Naxal attack in Darbha valley: A ten-vehicle convoy carrying Indian National Congress workers was ambushed by around 250 Naxalite rebels after a land mine was triggered in the Darbha valley, a remote area in the Sukma district. Among those killed were Chhattisgarh INC leader Nand Kumar Patel and his son, who were kidnapped during the incident and later found dead, as well as Salwa Judum founder and former state Minister, Mahendra Karma.	Communist Party of India (Maoist)		
Jun 10	Bombings, shootings	94	289	across Iraq	10 June 2013 Iraq attacks: Insurgents staged another series of coordinated attacks across central and northern Iraq. The incidents included a series of bombing and clashes in Mosul that killed 34 and wounded 123 others. Other attacks targeted Iraqi Army bases, markets, as well as police checkpoints.	Islamic State of Iraq; Suspected		
Jun 16	Bombings, shootings	54	174	across Iraq	16 June 2013 Iraq attacks: Insurgents set off a number of coordinated attacks across Iraq. Deadly attacks took place in Baghdad and Mosul, but most of the incidents focused on the country's south, including Kut, Najaf, Nassiriya and Basra.	Islamic State of Iraq; Suspected		
Jun 18	Suicide bombing	28	60+	Shergarh, Pakistan	2013 Mardan funeral bombing: A suicide bomber detonated his vest at a funeral. Among those killed in the attack was Imran Khan Mohmand, formerly an independent MPA.			
Jun 19	Bombing	22	20+	Mogadishu, Somalia	June 2013 Mogadishu attack: Militants detonated a car bomb at the main UNDP base and staged an assault on the compound. Government forces were able to retake control of the site after a 90-minute shootout.	al-Shabaab		
Jun 21	Bombing	15	25+	Peshawar, Pakistan	2013 Peshawar mosque bombing: A suicide bomber blew himself up at a Shiite mosque in the Gulshan neighborhood. The perpetrators first gunned down a police officer and a security guard before the suicide bomber entered the mosque.			
Jun 21	Bombing	0	0	Walsall, United Kingdom	Part of 4 attacks by Pavlo Lapshyn. A homemade bomb was left and detonated outside a mosque during Friday prayers.	Pavlo Lapshyn		
Jun 22–23	Mass murder	11	2	Nanga Parbat, Pakistan	2013 Nanga Parbat massacre	Tehrik-i-Taliban Pakistan		
Jun 25	Suicide car bombing, shooting	3		Kabul, Afghanistan	2013 Afghan presidential palace attack: Eight fighters cleared two high-level security clearances, entering one of the most heavily restricted areas in Kabul. They detonated a series of suicide bombs near the eastern gate of the Arg presidential palace, launching two rocket propelled grenades at the CIA headquarters in Afghanistan and engaging in a firefight with palace security guards. Three Afghan guards were killed, as well as all eight fighters.	Taliban		
Jun 28	Bombing	0	0	Wolverhampton, United Kingdom	Part of 4 attacks by Pavlo Lapshyn. A homemade bomb was left and detonated outside a mosque during Friday prayers.	Pavlo Lapshyn		
Jul 2	Bombings, shootings	86	234	across Iraq	July 2013 Iraq attacks: Five car bombs exploded in predominantly Shia areas of Baghdad in the neighborhoods of Shuala, Kamiliyah, Shaab and Abu Tcheer. Other shootings also killed four people. At the same time two bombings in Kirkuk and Mosul resulted in one person dead and three others wounded. Other targets included Iraqi Army and Police forces, Sahwa members, as well as government officials.			
Jul 6	Raid	42	6	Mamudo, Yobe State, Nigeria	Yobe State school shooting: Gunmen attacked the Government Secondary School in a pre-dawn raid. Most of the victims were students, with the exception of a few staff members and at least one teacher. More than 100 people were reported missing in the aftermath of the attack. Some of the students were burned alive.	Boko Haram; Suspected		
Jul 12	Bombing	0	0	Tipton, United Kingdom	Part of 4 attacks by Pavlo Lapshyn. A homemade bomb was left and detonated outside a mosque during Friday prayers.	Pavlo Lapshyn		
Jul 20–21	Clashes	21	6	Arauca, Colombia	2013 Colombian clashes: During clashes over two days, 17 Colombian forces died on the first day and four others the next day. At the same time the rebels took U.S. citizen Kevin Scott Sutay hostage on 20 June. The attacks occurred during peace talks in Cuba between the government and FARC.	FARC or ELN		
Jul 27	Suicide truck bomb	6	9	Mogadishu, Somalia	2013 Mogadishu Turkish embassy attack: A suicide bomber drove a truck into the gate of the Turkish embassy.	Al Shabaab		
Aug 21	Chemical attack	281–1,729	3,600	Ghouta, Syria	Ghouta chemical attack: A series of chemical attacks were conducted in the Ghouta region.	Syrian Arab Army / Syrian rebels (suspected)		
Sep 9–28	Clashes, arson and hostage-taking	220	~254	Zamboanga City, Philippines	Zamboanga City crisis: Separatists tried to seize control of the city center, leading to weeks of clashes with government forces	Moro National Liberation Front		
Sep 13	Truck bomb, shooting	2	20	Herat, Afghanistan	2013 attack on U.S. consulate in Herat: Seven militants attacked the U.S. consulate using truck bombs, assault rifles, and rocket-propelled grenades	Taliban		
Sep 21	Shooting	68	~100	Nairobi, Kenya	Westgate shopping mall attack: 10 men attacked the Westgate Shopping Mall, an exclusive shopping centre.	al-Shabab		
Oct 27	Bombs	5	66	Patna, Bihar, India	2013 Patna bombings: Eight bombs exploded just before BJP opposition prime ministerial candidate Narendra Modi was due to speak in the lead-up to the 2014 Indian general election	Indian Mujahideen (Suspected)		
Oct 28	Car attack	5	38	Beijing, China	2013 Tiananmen Square attack: An SUV truck drove off the road at north of Tiananmen Square, passed barriers and caught fire in front of the main entrance of the Forbidden City. The attack claimed all three occupants of the vehicle, who were suspected to be Uighurs and two tourists, one Filipina and one Chinese. The incident was suspected to be a suicide attack.	East Turkestan Islamic Movement (Suspected)		
Dec 5	Suicide car bombing	56	200+	Sana'a, Yemen	2013 Sanaa attack: A suicide bomber drove an explosive-laden car towards the western entrance of the Defense Ministry complex. The suicide car bombing was followed by a coordinated attack by militants in another car. Another coordinated attack and gunfight outside the complex was reported to have taken place later that day.	al Qaeda in the Arabian Peninsula(Suspected)		
Dec 25	Car bombings	8	37	Baghdad, Iraq	2013 Baghdad Christmas Day bombings: Three separate bombings targeted Christians.			
Dec 27	Car bombing	8	70	Beirut, Lebanon	Assassination of Mohamad Chatah: A car bomb struck the convoy of Mohamad Chatah, a former minister of finance and ambassador to the United States.			

Total Incidents: 44
