= May 2013 Iraq attacks =

2013 violence throughout cities in Iraq during the post-U.S. insurgency

- Part of Iraqi insurgency (post-U.S. withdrawal)
- Location: across Iraq (see maps below)
- Date: 15–21 May 2013
- Target: Shia and Sunni civilians, Iraqi security forces
- Attack type: Car bombings, suicide bombings, roadside bombings, mortar attacks, shootings
- Weapons: Car bombs; IEDs; Automatic weapons
- Deaths: 449
- Injuries: 732

From 15 to 21 May 2013, a series of deadly bombings and shootings struck the central and northern parts of Iraq, with a few incidents occurring in towns in the south and far west as well. The attacks killed at least 449 people and left 732 others injured in one of the deadliest outbreaks of violence in years.

== Background ==
From a peak of 3,000 deaths per month in 2006–07, violence in Iraq decreased steadily for several years before beginning to rise again in 2012. In December 2012, Sunnis began to protest perceived mistreatment by the Shia-led government. The protests had been largely peaceful, but insurgents, emboldened by the war in neighboring Syria, stepped up attacks in the initial months of 2013. The number of attacks rose sharply after the Iraqi army raided a protest camp in Hawija on 23 April 2013. Overall, 712 people were killed in April according to UN figures, making it the nation's deadliest month in five years.

Post-Hawija targets have included both Sunni and Shia mosques, as well as security forces and tribal leaders. According to Mahmoud al-Sumaidaie, the deputy head of Iraq's Sunni Endowment, at least 29 Sunni mosques were attacked between mid-April and mid-May, resulting in the deaths of at least 65 worshippers. In contrast, only two Shiite places of worship were attacked during the same period, with a single person being killed. During the whole of 2012, a total of 10 Sunni mosques were attacked, signifying a recent increase in the sectarian nature of the insurgency.

== Attacks ==
On 15 May, a total of nine car bombs struck the capital Baghdad, killing 23 people and injuring 108 others. All of the attacks targeted Shia civilians, with bombs exploding at a bus stop in Sadr City, as well as locations in Kadhimiya and New Baghdad. A pair of bombs detonated near government offices in the northern city of Kirkuk, killing 10 people and injuring 13 others, while 2 policemen were injured in a roadside bombing outside the city. A roadside blast in Mosul killed 2 policemen and injured another. A suicide bomber struck a checkpoint in Tarmiyah, killing 2 policemen and injuring 8 others. Mortar shelling killed a soldier in Akashat, near the border with Syria, while a bombing in Hammam al-Alil killed 2 soldiers and wounded 3 others. Blasts in Baqubah and Muqdadiyah killed a civilian and injured 5 others. Unidentified gunmen killed 2 Sahwa militiamen in Mehraijiya.

Locations of some of the attacks on 15–19 May
Locations of some of the attacks on 20 May

Attacks continued at a similar pace on 16 May, with 40 people killed and 107 injured across the country. In Kirkuk, a suicide bomber attacked a mosque where the memorial service for the victims of the previous day's bombings was taking place, killing 12 people and injuring 36 others. A separate bombing in the city killed 2 children. In the capital Baghdad, a car bombing killed 9 people and injured 28 others in Sadr City, while gunmen shot dead the brother of an Iraqiya party member and injured 2 of his bodyguards. Other attacks in the Kamaliya, Bayaa and Chkok neighborhoods killed 6 people and wounded 24 others, all of them civilians. Four bombings struck Mosul, killing 2 soldiers and injuring 13 others, including 5 members of the security forces. Bombings in Tarmiyah and Shirqat killed 4 police officers and injured 4 others. In addition, gunmen shot dead an employee of the civil defense agency in Fallujah.

Violence rose sharply on 17 May, as most of the incidents appeared to target Sunnis in apparent retaliation for previous attacks against Shiites. Twin bombings struck Baqubah, with the first bomb exploding as worshippers were leaving the town's main Sunni mosque after attending morning prayers. As people gathered to help the wounded, a second explosion occurred, inflicting even more damage than the first. At least 43 people were killed and 80 others were injured in the attacks, which were the second deadliest to ever hit the city after a July 2004 bombing at a police recruit center that killed 68 people. "I was about 30 meters from the first explosion. When the first exploded, I ran to help them, and the second one went off. I saw bodies flying and I had shrapnel in my neck," reported an eyewitness. The attack continued a trend of targeting Sunni mosques; about thirty were attacked between mid-April and mid-May. Baqubah was an important center for the insurgency during the height of the Iraq War and was declared to be the center of operations for the Islamic State of Iraq in 2006, before US troops moved in and forced the group to relocate. The city was the site of major attacks in 2004, 2008 and 2010.

Later in the day, a roadside bomb killed 8 people and injured 25 others in Madain, a town 12 miles south of Baghdad, near Salman Pak. The bombing targeted a funeral procession for a Sunni cleric who was killed the previous day. In the capital Baghdad, twin car bombs in Ghazaliya and Baladiyat killed 8 people and wounded 33 others, before a powerful bomb rocked a shopping center in the upscale Sunni neighborhood of Amariyah during evening rush hour. The blast killed 21 people and injured 32 others, and it was followed by another explosion in the southern Dora district that left 4 people dead and 22 wounded. In Fallujah, 40 miles west of the capital, an explosion at a cafe killed 2 civilians and injured 9 others. Gunmen shot dead a candidate for the Nineveh provincial council in Qayara, as well as an inspection department employee and his cousin in Kirkuk. In addition, a woman's body was found with gunshot wounds near Mosul.

Large bombings were absent on 18 May, as 40 people were killed and 25 injured nationwide, mostly in smaller attacks. These included a car bombing in Latifiya that left 5 dead and 10 injured, and an explosion at a stadium in Ramadi that killed 4 and wounded 12 others. North of Ramadi itself, a woman and her three children were killed during an Iraqi Army raid. Two local tribesmen were killed and another injured in clashes that took place after the raid, while unidentified gunmen kidnapped 10 Sunni policemen nearby. Two blasts in Mosul killed 3 soldiers and wounded 5 others, while gunmen killed a policeman. Five Sahwa militiamen were killed and another wounded after attacks against checkpoints in Garma and Khalis. A rocket attack killed 3 soldiers and injured 4 others in Hammam al-Alil. Suicide bombings in Tal al-Ruman and Tal Abta wounded 4 soldiers and a police officer. Gunmen killed three people in Jubail and injured a senior military officer in Qaim. An explosion at a mosque in Madain injured four worshipers, while a Sunni cleric was assassinated in the southern city of Basra.

Small arms attacks continued on 19 May, with the primary targets being members of the Iraqi Police. The bodies of six of the policemen kidnapped near Ramadi the previous day were discovered on a highway in Al Anbar Governorate, while another officer was shot dead by gunmen nearby. Armed insurgents attacked checkpoints in Haditha and Rawa, killing 17 policemen and injuring 2 others. A councilman's home in Rawa was also targeted; seven attackers died during the assault. Three civilians were shot dead in Mosul, while a roadside blast killed another and injured two children. In the capital Baghdad gunmen attacked a cafe in Dora, killing 2 and injuring 5, while a blast in the east of the city killed one person and injured 5 others. Twin explosions in Fallujah injured two officers and two civilians. One man was killed and another injured in Riyadh, as they were apparently working on a motorcycle bomb. A married couple was killed in Khalis, while a gunshot-riddled body was discovered in a canal in Iskandariya. Bombings in Abu Ghraib and Shirqat injured five people. A farmer and his son were kidnapped near Samarra.

Violence reached a new peak on 20 May, with at least 133 killed and 283 injured across the country. Ten seemingly coordinated bombings rocked the capital Baghdad, killing 48 and injuring 154 others. The blasts took place in the Shoala, Shab, Ilam, Kamaliya, Zaafaraniya, Kadhimiya, al-Shurta and Saba Bour districts and targeted marketplaces and crowded areas along shopping streets. Two separate explosions were reported from Basra as well, killing 13 and injuring 50 others in rare attack in the southern port. Security forces attempted to rescue kidnapped policemen in Anbar Province, sparking a firefight that left 12 officers dead and 4 others injured. A bomb exploded near a bus carrying Iranian pilgrims in Balad, killing 14 people and wounding 13 others. A blast near a recruitment center in Samarra killed 13 Sahwa members and injured 9 others. In Hillah, a car bomb was detonated at a Shi'ite mosque, killing 12 and wounding at least 26 others. Attacks in Rawa and Zgerdan left 12 policemen dead and 3 others wounded. Three separate blasts in Mosul injured 7 people, including 2 Iraqi soldiers. Mortar fire struck a home in Tal Afar, killing a civilian and injuring another. A similar attack killed another person and injured 4 others in Baqubah. A suicide bomber attempted to assassinate a Sahwa leader in Baiji, injuring him and two others and killing two of his bodyguards. A car bombing in Rutbah killed one and injured 4, while a sticky bomb in Tikrit killed a married couple and injured their child. A roadside explosion injured three people in Jalawla.

Attacks continued across central and northern Iraq on 21 May, with 60 people killed and 132 others injured across the country. In Abu Ghraib, a car bomb near a Sunni mosque killed 11 civilians and injured 21 others, while an ambush left 4 Sahwa members and 2 others wounded. A bombing killed 6 and injured 18 others in Baghdad's Dora district, while double blasts in Tuz Khurmatu killed 5 and injured 46. A bomb also ripped through a livestock market in Kirkuk, killing 6 people and wounding 26 others. Gunmen shot dead 5 people in Mosul, including a soldier and 2 police officers, and injured 4 others. Three civilians were killed and three others injured after a blast in Baqubah, while two roadside bombs in Kanaan killed three others. A Sunni couple was killed by gunmen in Khalis, while two policemen were injured after a clash near Jalawla. At least five other deaths were reported from Diyala Governorate. Gunmen injured two policemen in Karmah, while a blast in Ramadi killed one of the organizers of the Anbar protests.

The spate of attacks heightened fears that violence would continue to rise due to retaliation back and forth between Shias and Sunnis. No group claimed initial responsibility, though such widespread and coordinated attacks have mostly been claimed by the Islamic State of Iraq in the past.

== Reactions ==
=== Domestic ===
Talal al-Zobaie, a Sunni member of the Iraqi Parliament, called on his colleagues to unite and face the enemies of Iraq together. "The government should admit that it has failed to secure the country and the people, and all security commanders should be replaced by efficient people who can really confront terrorism. Sectarianism that has bred armies of widows and orphans in the past is now trying to make a comeback in this country, and everybody should be aware of this", he said in a statement released to the press. Jawad al-Hasnawi, a lawmaker with the Sadrist Movement, loyal to Shiite cleric Muqtada al-Sadr, said he believed the pattern of attacks was not coincidental, and terrorist groups were trying to reignite sectarian tensions in Iraq. "But the government bears full responsibility for this security chaos and it has to take quick and serious measures in order to stop the bloodshed, instead of just blaming other political blocs. Today and yesterday, the Iraqi people paid for the failure of government security forces. Everybody should expect darker days full of even deadlier attacks", Al-Hasnawi added.

=== International ===
- (Cooperation Council for the Arab States of the Gulf) Gulf Cooperation Council – The Secretary-General Abdullatif bin Rashid Al Zayani condemned the attacks, describing them as "outrageous criminal operations that contradict with Islam's faiths and the human values".
- Organisation of Islamic Cooperation – The OIC released a statement condemning the attacks and urging the Iraqi government and religious leaders to overcome their divisions.
- United Nations – A statement by Martin Kobler, the UN Special Representative for Iraq, condemned the violence and added that the fate of the Iraqi people was in the hands of their leaders. "Small children are burned alive in cars. Worshippers are cut down outside their own mosques. This is beyond unacceptable. It is the politicians' responsibility to act immediately and to engage in dialogue to resolve the political impasse and put an end to this.", the statement read.
- United States – State Department spokeswoman Jennifer Psaki called the latest attacks "a reprehensible and deliberate attempt to sow instability and division" in the country, adding that "the risk of sectarian conflict is always a great concern given Iraq's history. We remain committed to supporting Iraq's democratic system."

== See also ==
- List of terrorist incidents, January–June 2013
- 2012–2013 Iraqi protests
