= 19 March 2013 Iraq attacks =

Bombings and shootings in Baghdad, U.S.-occupied Iraq

- Part of Iraqi insurgency (post-U.S. withdrawal)
- Location: Across Iraq
- Date: 19 March 2013
- Target: Shia civilians, Iraqi security forces
- Attack type: Car bombings, suicide bombings, roadside bombings, shootings
- Weapons: Car bombs; IEDs; Automatic weapons
- Deaths: At least 98
- Injuries: At least 240
- Perpetrator: Islamic State of Iraq

The 19 March 2013 Iraq attacks were a series of coordinated bombings and shootings across the capital Baghdad and several major cities in the north and central parts of the country. At least 98 people were killed and more than 240 others injured in the wave of violence, which took place on the tenth anniversary of the beginning of the Iraq War.

== Background ==
The attacks occurred on the 10th anniversary of the Iraq War, and about sixteen months following the withdrawal of the United States military forces from the area, leaving the security of the country in the hands of the Iraqi security forces. Violence slightly rose during 2012, with militant groups averaging about one major attack every month.

In addition, the country was in the midst of major protests by the Sunni population that began in December 2012. On 25 January 2013, the demonstrations against the government of Prime Minister Nouri al-Maliki turned deadly in Fallujah, as soldiers opened fire on a crowd of rock-throwing demonstrators, killing 7 and injuring more than 70 others. Three soldiers were later shot to death in retaliation for the incident, and clashes erupted in the city.

On 14 February Human Rights Watch called on Iraqi authorities to complete and announce the results of the ongoing parliamentary committee and the Defense Ministry investigations into the Fallujah shootings. On 8 March Iraqi Police forces shot at protesters in Mosul, killing three and injuring nine others. In response to this, Agriculture Minister Izz al-Din al-Dawla announced his resignation, while Parliament Speaker Usama al-Nujayfi called on other Sunni officials to follow suit.

== Attacks ==
Numerous attacks were conducted within hours of each other on 19 March 2013 across Baghdad, Mosul and several smaller cities in Iraq.

- In the capital Baghdad the string of attacks began around 8:00 AM local time, with blasts in the Mashtal and New Baghdad neighborhoods that killed eight and left 20 others injured. A bomb at the Ministry of Labor in Qahira killed seven and wounded 21, while another blast at a restaurant near the entrance to the Green Zone left six dead and 15 injured. At least seven car bombs were detonated and a number of shootings took place in Kadhimiya, Zafraniya and Husseiniya, killing 28 and wounding 70. The sprawling Sadr City slum was a target as well – sticky bombs killed four civilians, an IED killed two others, while car bomb attacks against security forces killed six and injured 22 others.
- Just south of the capital, two car bombs at a checkpoint and a bus stop in Iskandariya killed eight and wounded eight others. A similar attack in Mahmoudiyah left five dead and ten injured. Mortar strikes in Taji, Haditha and Haswa killed five and injured eight others. Car bombings in Baqubah, Musayyib and Tarmiyah killed four and injured at least ten others.
- In Iraq's north, a suicide bomber assassinated a local police chief and two of his bodyguards in Mosul, while injuring seven others. Another bombing in the city left three civilians dead and five injured, while a tribal chief was gunned down near his home in nearby Noor. Roadside blasts in Tikrit killed two policemen and left two others injured. Another officer died and two were injured in similar attacks in Sinjar and Ramadi. In Tuz Khormato, gunmen blew up a grocery store, killing two and injuring four others. A car bomb in Baiji killed a police officer and injured 11 civilians, mostly students, while an intelligence official was gunned down in Tel Keppe.

== Perpetrators ==
On 20 March, the Islamic State of Iraq claimed responsibility for the wave of attacks in a statement published on a militant website. The group said the violence was in response to "the executions and massacres of convicted Sunni inmates" held in Iraqi prisons and warned the government to stop with the practice or "expect more bad events ... and seas of blood".

== Reactions ==
=== Domestic ===
- Iraq – Interior Ministry spokesperson Col. Saad Maan announced a large-scale investigation of the attacks on 20 March, saying that government forces "will not give up their responsibility and duty to fight terrorism" and promising "a swift and painful reaction" against the groups involved. Deputy Prime Minister Saleh al-Mutlaq asked people to "show compassion towards their brothers, the families of the victims, and help security forces in their effort" against terrorism.

=== International ===
- China – Foreign Ministry spokesman Hong Lei said his country condemned the attacks, adding that the Chinese government hoped that the "relevant parties can strengthen their unity in order to safeguard and promote the stability and development of Iraq".
- European Union – High Representative Catherine Ashton condemned the "unacceptable" attacks, adding that Iraqis need to "remain steadfast in their continued rejection of attempts by extremists to undermine the security and stability of their country". She also called on the Iraqi government and all leaders to engage in "genuine" dialogue in order to solve the problems facing the country.

== See also ==
- List of terrorist incidents, January–June 2013
- Iraqi insurgency (post U.S. withdrawal)
