= 16 June 2013 Iraq attacks =

Terrorist incident in Iraq

- Part of Iraqi insurgency (post-U.S. withdrawal)
- 16 June 2013 Iraq attacks (Iraq)
- Location: across Iraq (see map below)
- Date: 16 June 2013
- Target: Shia civilians, Iraqi security forces
- Attack type: Car bombings, suicide bombings, roadside bombings, shootings
- Weapons: Car bombs; IEDs; Automatic weapons
- Deaths: 54
- Injuries: 174

On 16 June 2013, a series of coordinated bombings and shootings struck across several cities in Iraq, killing at least 54 people and injuring more than 170 others.

== Background ==
From a peak of 3,000 deaths per month in 2006–07, violence in Iraq decreased steadily for several years before beginning to rise again in 2012. In December 2012, Sunnis began to protest perceived mistreatment by the Shia-led government. The protests had been largely peaceful, but insurgents, emboldened by the war in neighboring Syria, stepped up attacks in the initial months of 2013. The number of attacks rose sharply after the Iraqi army raided a protest camp in Hawija on 23 April 2013. Overall, 712 people were killed in April according to UN figures, making it the nation's deadliest month in five years. Conditions continued to deteriorate in May when the UN Assistance Mission for Iraq reported at least 1,045 Iraqis were killed and another 2,397 wounded in acts of terrorism and acts of violence, making it the deadliest month in the country since April 2008.

The attacks on 16 June occurred about a month after Iraq's deadliest week in almost 5 years, as a series of deadly bombings and shootings across the country killed at least 449 people and left 732 others injured between 15 May and 21 May.

== Attacks ==
Unlike most of the violence in Iraq during previous months, the majority of deadly attacks took place in southern cities, where such incidents are relatively rare. In the city of Kut, a car bomb exploded in an industrial area early in the morning, killing 6 people and injuring 15 others. A second bombing outside the city killed 5 civilians and wounded another 12. In Najaf, at least 8 were killed and 29 injured after a bomb exploded at a local market. Other cities in the south were targeted as well - twin car bombs in the central area of Basra killed 6 and wounded 9, while similar attacks in Nasiriyah killed 2 and left 35 injured. A roadside blast in Hillah killed a civilian and wounded nine others.

Other attacks were reported from the central and northern parts of the country, in addition to the bombings in the south. A suicide bomber detonated his explosive vest at a coffee shop in Baghdad's Amin neighborhood, leaving 11 dead and at least 25 others injured. Gunmen attacked an oil pipeline in Hatra, south of Mosul, killing 6 Iraqi Army soldiers and wounding five more. In Mosul itself, two separate blasts injured 9 people, including 6 soldiers. A roadside bomb and a subsequent car bombing left 5 civilians dead and 12 others injured in Madain, near Salman Pak. Two civilians were killed and nine injured in a bombing in Mahmoudiyah, while a blast in Tuz Khormato killed two police officers and injured another, and four people were injured in an attack near Mahaweel. Two government employees were abducted near Riyadh.

== See also ==
- List of terrorist incidents, January–June 2013
- 2012–2013 Iraqi protests
