= 2010 Baqubah bombings =

2010 bombings in the Iraq War

3 March 2010 Baqubah bombing
- Part of Iraqi insurgency (2003–2011)
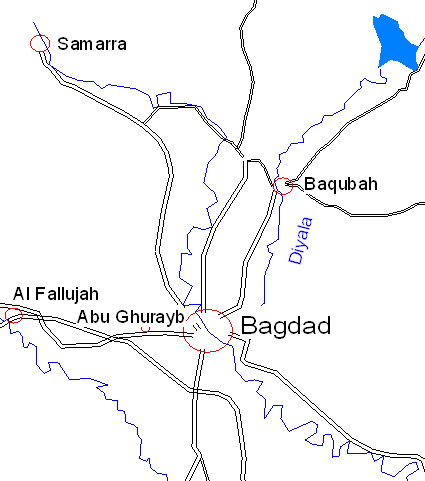
- Location: Baqubah, Iraq
- Date: 3 March 2010; 9:30 – 11:00 (UTC+3)
- Attack type: Car bombs/Suicide bombs
- Deaths: 33
- Injuries: 55
- Perpetrator: Unknown
- Motive: Disruption of 2010 Iraqi parliamentary election

The 3 March 2010 Baqubah bombings were a series of three bombings in Baqubah, Iraq, on 3 March 2010 that killed at least 33 people and injured 55 others. Baqubah, a mixed Sunni and Shia town, is the capital of Diyala Governorate, approximately 40 miles (64 km) north of the country's capital, Baghdad.

The bombings occurred in the lead-up to the parliamentary elections scheduled for 7 March 2010. At 9:45 am local time, a car bomb was detonated near a police station in the western part of the city. A few moments later, approximately 100 yards (91 m) away, another car bomb was detonated near the provincial building. A suicide bomber later detonated a bomb at the hospital where some of the wounded were being treated. The hospital bomber posed as a police lieutenant and rode an ambulance to the hospital. A fourth bomb was found near the hospital and defused.

After the bombings, a full curfew was imposed on the city of Baqubah, barring even pedestrians. Among the dead were ten policemen, and Dr. Ali al-Timimi, head of Diyala Governorate's health department.

No organization has claimed responsibility for carrying out the bombings. The Islamic State of Iraq organization had previously promised to disrupt the elections on 7 March. Authorities, both American and Iraqi, have reportedly warned that more attacks could occur before, and even after the elections. Despite the concerns, early voting began, as scheduled, the morning of 4 March.

== United States response ==
Pentagon spokesman Geoff Morrell said "It's disgraceful, it's deplorable. We strongly condemn it, that said, neither this attack nor any of the previous attempts to derail the electoral process and to destabilise the government have been or will be successful."

== See also ==
- List of terrorist incidents, 2010
- Terrorist incidents in Iraq in 2010
- 2008 Baquba bombings
