= Timeline of the Iraqi insurgency (2011–2013) =

Timeline of major events during the Iraqi insurgency (2011–2013)

Iraqi insurgency
- Part of the Iraqi conflict
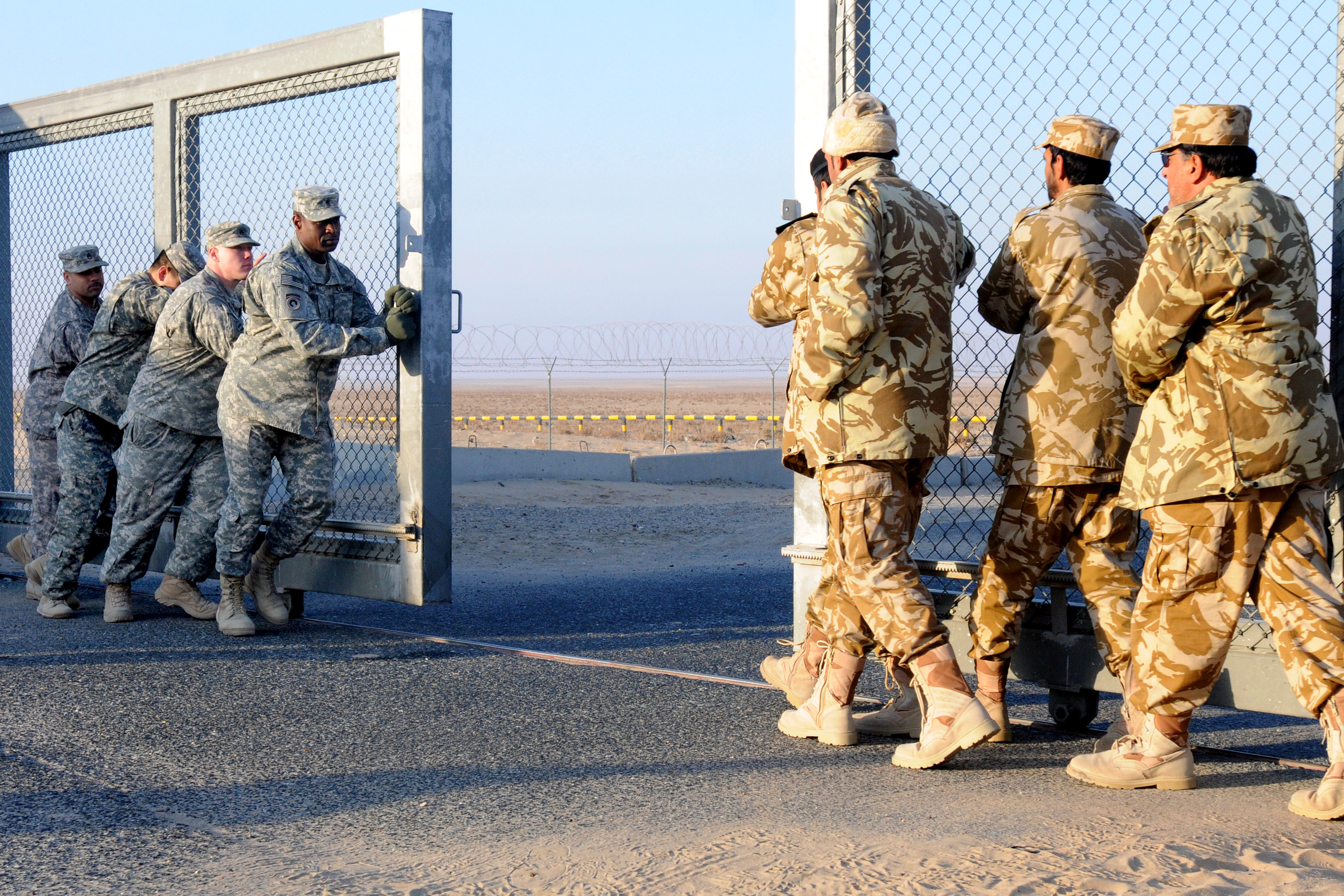
- U.S. and Kuwaiti troops unite to close the gate between Kuwait and Iraq after the last military convoy passed through on Dec. 18, 2011, signaling the end of Operation New Dawn and the beginning of the post-U.S. phase of the insurgency
Date	18 December 2011 – 30 December 2013 (2 years, 1 week and 5 days)
Location	Iraq (mostly central and northern, including Baghdad)
Result	Escalation of the insurgency, beginning of the War in Iraq (2013–2017): Significant increase in violence since the U.S. withdrawal, with an increasing number of insurgent large-scale attacks and assaults; Resurgence of ISI, later transforming to ISIL

Belligerents
(Iraq) Iraqi Government: Security forces; Private security contractors; Iraqi Kurdistan: Peshmerga; Asayish; CTG Kurdistan; Parastin u Zanyari; (Iraq) Sons of Iraq; Supported by: United States	Islamic State of Iraq (ISIL since April 2013) Islamic Army in Iraq; Naqshbandi Army; Other Sunni insurgents

Commanders and leaders
(Iraq) Nouri al-Maliki (Iraq) Jalal Talabani (Iraq) Babaker Zebari (Iraq) Ahmed Abu Risha (Kurdistan Region) Masoud Barzani	(Islamic State) Abu Bakr al-Baghdadi (Islamic State) Abu Mohammad al-Adnani Ishmael Jubouri (Iraq) Izzat Ibrahim al-Douri

Strength
Iraqi Security Forces; 600,000 (300,000 Army and 300,000 Police); Awakening Council militias – 30,000; Contractors ~7,000	Supreme Command for Jihad and Liberation: 2,000–3,000; Islamic Army in Iraq: 10,400 (2007) Al-Qaeda: 1,000–2,000; JRTN: 1,500-5,000

Casualties and losses
1,156 policemen and 949 soldiers killed 2,286 policemen and 1,759 soldiers wounded	919+ insurgents killed, 3,504 arrested
- 6,746 civilians killed and 10,511 wounded; 9,770 people killed in total (Government figures, December 2011 – December 2013); 14,855 civilians killed (Iraq body count figures, December 2011 – December 2013)

The following is a timeline of major events during the Iraqi insurgency (2011–2013):

- Timeline of the Iraqi insurgency (2011)
- Timeline of the Iraqi insurgency (2012)
- Timeline of the Iraqi insurgency (2013)
