= 10 June 2013 Iraq attacks =

Terrorist incident in Iraq

- Part of Iraqi insurgency (post-U.S. withdrawal)
- Location: across central and northern Iraq (see map below)
- Date: 10 June 2013; UTC+03:00
- Target: Shia and Sunni civilians, Iraqi security forces
- Attack type: Car bombings, suicide bombings, roadside bombings, shootings
- Weapons: Car bombs; IEDs; Automatic weapons
- Deaths: 94
- Injuries: 289

On 10 June 2013, a series of coordinated bombings and shootings struck the central and northern parts of Iraq, killing at least 94 people and injuring 289 others.

== Background ==
From a peak of 3,000 deaths per month in 2006–07, violence in Iraq decreased steadily for several years before beginning to rise again in 2012. In December 2012, Sunnis began to protest perceived mistreatment by the Shia-led government. The protests had been largely peaceful, but insurgents, emboldened by the war in neighboring Syria, stepped up attacks in the initial months of 2013. The number of attacks rose sharply after the Iraqi army raided a protest camp in Hawija on 23 April 2013. Overall, 712 people were killed in April according to UN figures, making it the nation's deadliest month in five years.

Post-Hawija targets have included both Sunni and Shia mosques, as well as security forces and tribal leaders. According to Mahmoud al-Sumaidaie, the deputy head of Iraq's Sunni Endowment, at least 29 Sunni mosques were attacked between mid-April and mid-May, resulting in the deaths of at least 65 worshippers. In contrast, only two Shiite places of worship were attacked during the same period, with a single person being killed. During the whole of 2012, a total of 10 Sunni mosques were attacked, signifying a recent increase in the sectarian nature of the insurgency.

== Attacks ==
Locations of the deadly attacks on 10 June

Unlike recent waves of attacks across the country, the northern city of Mosul was the scene of some of the worst violence of the day. Five near-simultaneous car bombs exploded at different checkpoints, killing 29 people and injuring 114 others, most of them members of the security forces. Clashes in the western neighborhood of Tamuz left 4 police officers dead and 8 others wounded, while gunmen ambushed a convoy outside the city, killing another policemen and wounding two of his colleagues. After the evening attacks, Iraqi Police units announced a curfew was in effect for the whole Mosul area.

In the town of Jidaidat al-Shatt, just outside Baqubah, a triple car bombing struck a crowded fruit and vegetable market, leaving 15 dead and 50 others wounded. Soon after the blasts, security forces closed the main highway linking Baghdad and Baqubah as a precautionary measure. Another car bombing killed 11 and injured 30 in Tuz Khormato, while a similar attack at a fish market in Taji killed 8 and injured 24. Twin suicide bombings in Madain and Dibis killed 3 police officers and a civilian, while injuring 24 other people. A group of more than 20 insurgents attacked an Iraqi Army base outside Kirkuk, sparking heavy clashes that killed 5 militants, including one suicide bomber. A car bombing within the city itself killed 3 civilians and wounded 12 others. An insurgents ambush near Alillai killed four Iraqi Army soldiers. In the capital Baghdad, two bombs exploded near coffee shops in Sadr City, killing 4 and injuring 12 others. Another blast in the Amin district injured 6 civilians.

Various smaller attacks took place across parts of the country as well. Bombings were reported from Iskandariya and Tal Afar, with one civilian dead and six others injured. North of Fallujah, gunmen killed a Sahwa member and injured two of his bodyguards, while clashes were reported from the city itself.

== Reactions ==
=== Domestic ===
Usama al-Nujayfi, the Speaker of Iraq's Parliament and a member of the Iraqi National List, released a statement in which he condemned the wave of attacks and called on security forces to "take all the required measures to eliminate these attacks by which the terrorists seek to hit Iraq's unity and ignite sectarianism in the country."

=== International ===
- United Nations – In a statement released on 12 June, Secretary-General Ban Ki-moon voiced his concern over "the escalating political tensions and the appalling upsurge of violence", while urging all parties involved to "redouble their efforts to ensure that the momentum of national reconciliation is not lost to those groups that strive to reignite sectarian violence in Iraq."

== See also ==
- List of terrorist incidents, January–June 2013
- 2012–2013 Iraqi protests
