= 2005 Musayyib bombing =

Suicide attack in Iraq

Coordinates: 32.778°N 44.29°E

- Part of Iraqi insurgency (2003–2006) in Iraqi insurgency (2003–2011)
- Location: Musayyib, Iraq
- Date: 16 July 2005
- Target: Marketplace
- Attack type: Suicide bombing
- Deaths: 100
- Injuries: 150
- Perpetrator: Unknown

The 2005 Musayyib bombing was a suicide attack on a marketplace in Musayyib, Iraq, a town 35 miles south of Baghdad on 16 July 2005.

The attacker had detonated his explosive belt in a crowded marketplace, where hundreds of people had come to shop and mingle after the day's stifling heat subsided. The attack happened as a tanker containing cooking gas was passing, triggering an inferno that destroyed dozens of buildings, including a nearby Shia mosque where worshipers were emerging from evening prayers.
