= Tuz Khurmatu Air Base =

Tuz Khurmatu Air Base FOB Bernstein
- Tuz Khurmatu, Saladin Governorate in Iraq

Site information
- Type: Air base
- Owner: Iraqi Armed Forces
- Operator: Iraqi Ground Forces
- Condition: Defunct

Location
- Shown within Iraq
- Coordinates: 34°56′04″N 44°29′03″E

Site history
- Built: 1983; 43 years ago
- In use: 1983 — 2003 (Iraqi Air Force); 2003 — 2006 (U.S. Armed Forces); 2006 — present (Iraqi Ground Forces)
- Battles/wars: Iran–Iraq War; 2003 invasion of Iraq

Airfield information
- Elevation: 186 metres (610 ft) AMSL
Runways
Direction	Length and surface
11/29	3,300 metres (10,827 ft)

Tuz Khurmatu Air Base is a former Iraqi Air Force base in the Saladin Governorate of Iraq, located approximately 180 kilometres (110 mi) north of Baghdad, and about 14 kilometres (8.7 mi) west of Tuz Khurmatu.

== History ==
In 1983, Tuz Khurmatu Air Base was constructed to improve the deployment flexibility of the Iraqi Air Force (IQAF). It was also part of a national drive to construct new airfields and renovate existing airfields. One 3,300 meter long runway orientated NW/SE was constructed. Additional installation of facilities included 4 high-speed approaches, one taxiway, one cross-over link, and an apron. There was one dispersal facility that totalled up to 6 hardstands/aircraft bunkers, with one at the end of each high-speed approaches, and the other two adjoined to the cross-over link. It was in the early-stages of construction by June 1983. At some point, additional high-speed approaches were installed.

=== 2003 Iraq war and onwards ===
The base was seized by U.S.-led Coalition forces during Operation Iraqi Freedom in 2003. After its capture, it became a U.S. Army Forward Operating Base and renamed Forward Operating Base (FOB) Bernstein. Personnel from Company B of 2nd Battalion, 27th Infantry Regiment, and also Special Troops Battalion, 3rd Brigade, 25th Infantry Division were based within FOB Bernstein. By then, the airfield was abandoned and unused. The base had basic facilities, which included a permanent dining hall and recreational building. The base was handed over to the Iraqi army in January 2006. The "Cobra" 3rd Battalion, 2nd Brigade of 4th Division (Iraq) assumed control of the base.
