= Operation al-Shabah =

Military operation in 2013

- Part of the Syrian civil war and Iraqi insurgency
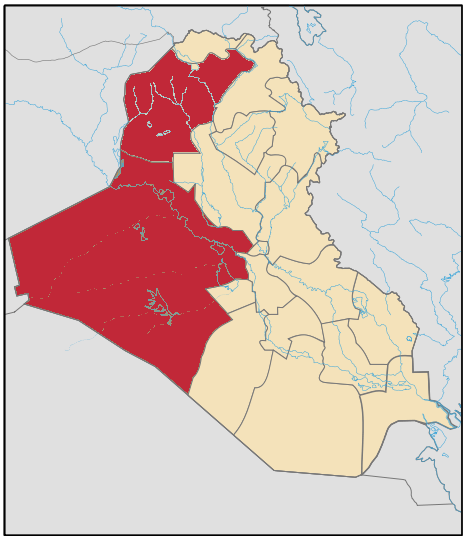
- Location of Al Anbar and Nineveh Governorates within Iraq
Date	20 May – 14 July 2013 (1 month, 3 weeks and 3 days)
Location	Al Anbar and Nineveh Governorates, Iraq
Result	Several militant camps and weapons caches eliminated

Belligerents
Islamic State of Iraq and the Levant Al-Nusra Front	(Iraq) Iraqi Government; Iraqi Army; Iraqi Air Force; Iraqi Police

Commanders and leaders
Abu Bakr al-Baghdadi Ahmed al-Sharaa	(Iraq) Nouri al-Maliki (Iraq) Babaker Shawkat B. Zebari (Iraq) Lieutenant-General Basim al-Tai

Strength
Unknown	8,000

Casualties and losses
43 killed, 57 captured	20 policemen killed 16 policemen injured 7 soldiers killed 10 soldiers injured
- 3 Syrian civilians killed 6 Iraqi civilians killed 4 Iraqi civilians kidnapped 6 Iraqi civilians injured

Operation al-Shabah (Arabic: عملية الشبح, lit. 'Operation Phantom') was launched in May 2013 by the Iraqi Army, with the stated aim of severing contact between the Islamic State of Iraq and the Levant and the al-Nusra Front in Syria by clearing militants from the border area with Syria and Jordan.

== Background ==
Co-operation between Al-Nusra Front and the Islamic State of Iraq on a larger scale began in March 2013, as the groups staged an elaborate ambush near Akashat that left 51 Syrian and 9 Iraqi soldiers dead. ISI officially claimed responsibility a week later.

In April 2013, the leader of the Islamic State of Iraq, Abu Bakr al-Baghdadi, released a recorded audio message on the Internet, in which he announced that Jabhat al-Nusra was an extension of al-Qaeda in Iraq in Syria. Al-Baghdadi said that Ahmed al-Sharaa, the leader of Jabhat al-Nusra, had been dispatched by the group along with a group of men to Syria to meet with pre-existing cells in the country. Al-Baghdadi also said that the ISI had provided Jabhat al-Nusra with the plans and strategy needed for the Syrian civil war and had been providing them funding on a monthly basis. Al-Baghdadi declared that the two groups were officially merging under the name "Islamic State of Iraq and the Levant." The next day the leader of al-Nusra, al-Julani, denied that any such merger exists, while reiterating that al-Nusra Front is the Syrian branch of al-Qaeda. Julani was quoted as saying "We inform you that neither the al-Nusra command nor its consultative council, nor its general manager were aware of this announcement. It reached them via the media and if the speech is authentic, we were not consulted."

In May 2013, a video was released on the Internet showing masked men publicly execute three captured Alawite officers in the eastern town of Raqqa, the men identified themselves as being members of the Islamic State of Iraq and the Levant. In the same month, Reuters reported that the leader of the Islamic State of Iraq, Abu Bakr al-Baghdadi, had traveled from Iraq to Syria's Raqqa Governorate province and began attempting to take over the leadership of al-Nusra. There were media reports that the group had suffered a split, with many of al-Nusra's fighters operating under the banner of the Islamic State of Iraq and the Levant, and many Syrian Nusra fighters leaving the group to join the Islamic State of Iraq and the Levant group.

In early June, reports emerged from the rebel-held Syrian city of Raqqa of Islamist fighters setting up "complaint bureaus", where anyone accused of crimes could be held accountable in front of a Sharia court. The notice was signed by the "Islamic State of Iraq and al-Sham", al-Sham being a popular term for the Levant region. As the Iraqi Army operation was taking place, al-Qaeda leader Ayman al-Zawahiri issued an official statement on June 9, ruling against the merger of the two groups ordered by al-Baghdadi and appointing a local Syrian commander named Abu Khalid al-Suri as an emissary "to oversee the implementation of the accord". It was not immediately clear if ISIL leader Abu Bakr al-Baghdadi would accept the ruling and what effect it would have on the ground. Ayman al-Zawahiri stated that the Islamic State of Iraq should continue to operate only in Iraq as the Iraqi branch of al-Qaeda and similarly the al-Nusra Front should operate only in Syria as the Syrian branch of al-Qaeda. On June 15, an audio message purported to be by al-Baghdadi was released online, in which he insisted the merger will continue as planned, despite the order by al-Zawahiri. Intelligence analysts described the move as "a potentially very damaging split within al-Qaeda's senior leadership." The Islamic State of Iraq and the Levant would eventually be excommunicated and disowned by al-Qaeda in February 2014.

== Timeline ==
The operation started on 20 May 2013, and 8,000 members of the Iraqi security forces were involved. During the first 24 hours, 43 militants, including 11 wanted al-Qaeda operatives, were captured in the no-mans land with Syria. Short range rockets, mortar rounds, rocket launch pads, explosive charges and communication devices were found. By 24 May 2013, 32 militants were killed during the operation and 51 were captured, including seven women. At the time of the start of the campaign, Iraqi border troops were increasingly coming under sniper fire from Syrian militants across the border. According to the Iraqi military, a large number of Turkish-made military equipment was seized during the operation. Two senior commanders of the Islamic State of Iraq and the Levant were among those reported killed.

On June 2, ISIL gunmen in four vehicles set up a fake checkpoint on a highway close to the Jordanian border in the western parts of Al Anbar Province, ambushing a convoy of three Syrian and four Iraqi trucks. The three Syrian truck drivers were killed and their trucks looted, while four Iraqis were kidnapped. Clashes were reported near Ar Rutba after the ambush, with government artillery units shelling suspected insurgent hideouts south of the city. In a separate incident, a police officer from the town was found dead a day after he was kidnapped by unidentified gunmen. Insurgents staged another ambush on June 5, killing 10 border police officers and 5 civilians after their bus stopped at a fake checkpoint outside Nukhayb, near the border between Al Anbar and Karbala Governorate. On June 9, suspected Syrian rebels opened fire on two Iraqi border posts less than 2 km from the Al-Waleed border crossing, killing a police officer and injuring two others.

Ahead of the postponed governorate elections in both provinces on June 20, government forces closed all roads in Al Anbar with the exception of the international highway. In addition to this security measure, a curfew was imposed on all of Nineveh Province. While the election day itself passed relatively peacefully in the border areas, on June 21 a group of gunmen attacked Iraqi Army positions northwest of Al-Qa'im, blowing up a bridge across the Euphrates and sparking a battle that forced the government troops to call in helicopter gunships as reinforcements. Three Iraqi soldiers were killed and three others injured, while at least six of the attackers died during the clashes as well. Government forces destroyed several insurgent vehicles and captured various weapons and ammunition. Clashes around the border continued overnight, with reports of 2 Syrian militants killed and 3 Iraqi soldiers injured. On June 22, a parked car bomb was detonated near Khor, east of Al-Qa'im, as an Iraqi Army convoy was passing by the scene of the previous day's fighting. Two soldiers were killed in the blast, while three others were wounded. On June 23, insurgents attacked two checkpoints in the town of Kebaysah in western Anbar, sparking clashes that lasted for more than one hour. A police officer was killed in the fighting, while three of his colleagues and an Army soldier were wounded. Two soldiers were abducted by gunmen from one of the checkpoints, and their bodies were discovered nearby later in the day. On 25 June the governor of Nineveh, Ethel al-Nujaifi, escaped an assassination attempt when a roadside bomb exploded in the center of Mosul just as his convoy was passing by. Nujaifi escaped the attack unharmed, though four of his bodyguards were injured in the blast. On 26 June, a convoy of six cars was stopped near Al-Waleed, close to the Iraqi-Syrian border, sparking a shootout that left one gunman dead. Later on the same day, the headquarters of the first battalion of the 7th Division in Anbar Province was attacked by a group of gunmen. Army forces repulsed the assault, while Iraqi Police later arrested two suspected militants.

On 1 July, the Iraqi Army announced the start of an operation aimed at clearing out insurgent bases in Anbar and Nineveh provinces. A security source confirmed that this resulted in the destruction of 3 buildings used by militants, as well as at least two fuel tanks and a vehicle repair shop near Elshabani, on the border between the two provinces. On July 4, Army forces discovered and destroyed a weapons cache in western Anbar province. On July 6, a border guard was killed and two others wounded in fighting against jihadists who tried to enter Syria. Three trucks belonging to smugglers were also destroyed during the clashes. On 8 July, the spokesman for the Nineweh provincial council, Qahtan Sami, was assassinated north of Mosul by gunmen with silenced pistols. On July 10, the chief of military operations for Nineweh, Lieutenant-General Basim al-Tai, escaped two separate assassination attempts, the first by an IED on the Mosul-Baghdad road, and the second a suicide car bombing against his convoy. On July 11, a pair of roadside blasts killed a police officer and injured two others near al-Qaim, while a suicide car bomber attacked a police convoy on the highway near Rutbah, killing an officer and wounding two others. On July 13, a border guard was killed and five others were wounded during clashes with ISIL gunmen who tried to enter Iraq from Syria. On July 14 the police chief for Nineweh survived an apparent assassination attempt, as a roadside blast targeted his motorcade.

== See also ==
- 2012–2013 Iraqi protests
- List of terrorist incidents, January–June 2013
