= Pavlo Lapshyn =

Ukrainian murderer (1988–2025)

- Павло Лапшин
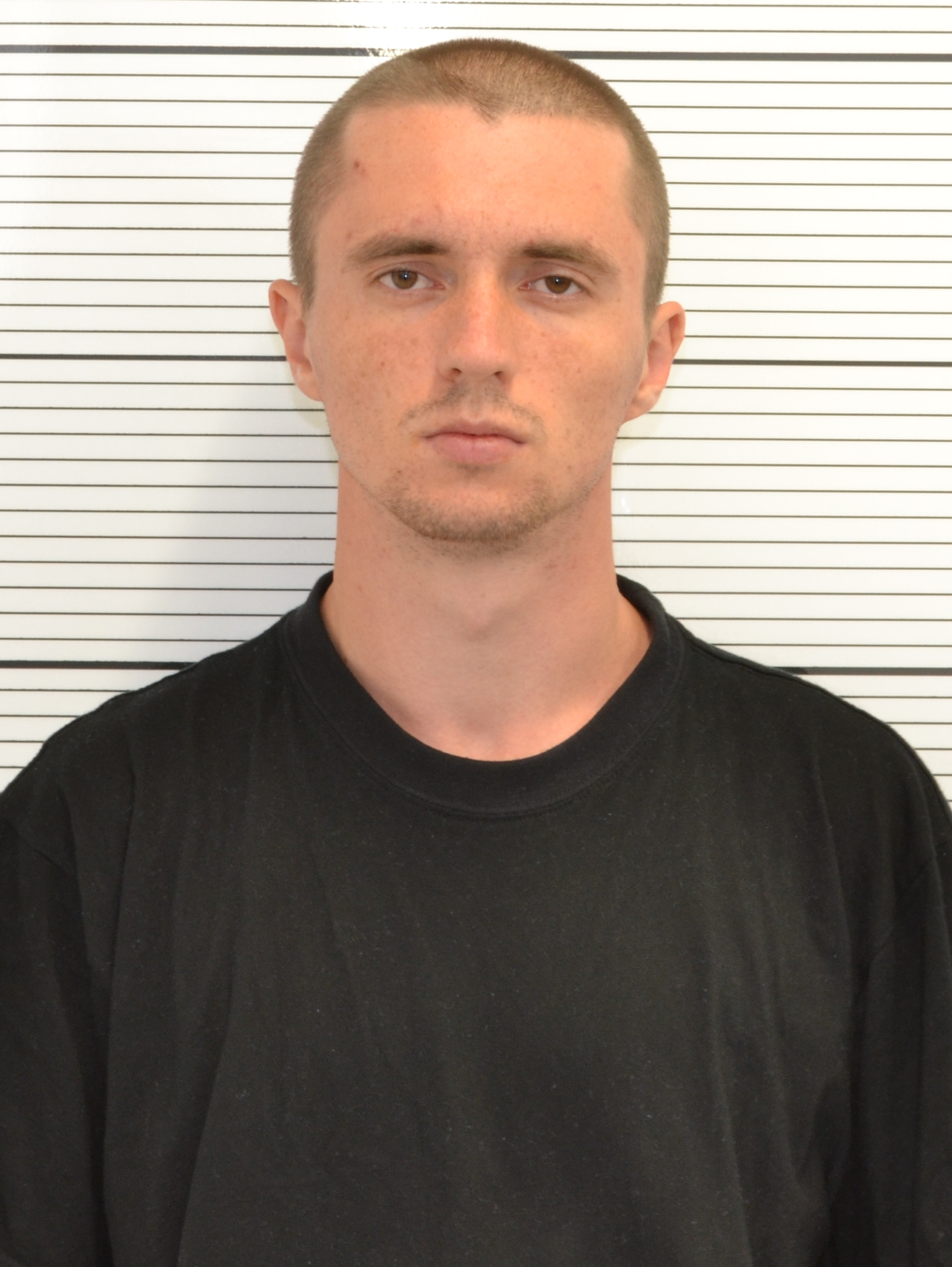
- Police photograph of Lapshyn after his arrest
- Born: Pavlo Serhiiovych Lapshyn; 12 March 1988; Dnipropetrovsk, Ukrainian SSR, Soviet Union
- Died: 23 September 2025 (aged 37); HMP Wakefield, West Yorkshire, England
- Occupation: Post-graduate engineering student
- Status: Deceased
- Motive: Racism
- Conviction: Murder
- Penalty: Life imprisonment (minimum of 40 years)

Details
- Date: 29 April to 12 July 2013
- Locations: Small Heath, Birmingham; Walsall; Wolverhampton; Tipton
- Target: Non-whites
- Killed: 1 (Mohammed Saleem)
- Injured: 0
- Weapons: Dagger, home-made explosives
- Date apprehended: 18 July 2013

Pavlo Serhiiovych Lapshyn (Ukrainian: Павло Сергійович Лапшин; 12 March 1988 – 23 September 2025) was a Ukrainian neo-Nazi terrorist who committed crimes in 2013 against Muslims in the United Kingdom. Lapshyn was given a life sentence, with a minimum term of 40 years, for the murder of 82-year-old Mohammed Saleem in Birmingham and three attempted bombings of mosques in the West Midlands. He confessed to police that his motivation was to kill and harm non-whites.

== Background ==
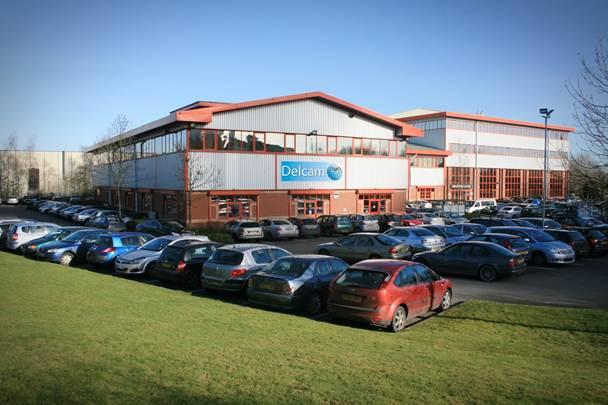
Lapshyn was on work experience at Delcam in Birmingham when he committed his attacks.

Pavlo Lapshyn was born on 12 March 1988. He was from Dnipropetrovsk, the son of Sergey Lapshyn, a university lecturer. Lapshyn's father claimed his son was not a racist, and said Pavlo knew his grandmother was a member of the (largely Muslim) Tatar community. Skinheads in Dnipropetrovsk said that they never encountered Lapshyn.

Lapshyn studied engineering in his home city at the National Metallurgical Academy of Ukraine. In 2009 he earned a BA with honours, and completed a master's degree the following year. He then began to pursue a doctorate. Lapshyn was arrested in August 2010 after inadvertently causing an explosion in his family's apartment. Lapshyn had been experimenting with bomb-making chemicals while his family was on holiday. There is a short video he took of one explosion in Ukraine. About one month before Lapshyn murdered Mohammed Saleem, Lapshyn's mother nearly died in a car crash.

During his doctoral studies, Lapsyhn entered a competition to exchange with Coventry University and partake in work experience at Delcam – a software company based in the Birmingham neighbourhood of Small Heath, an area of East Birmingham 'which has a significant and visible Muslim population.' He was accepted after coming in third place for his work on 3D modelling and computer programming. Lapshyn arrived in Birmingham on 24 April 2013, and stayed in a flat inside Delcam's headquarters. Colleagues described him as shy, yet polite.

== Attacks ==
=== Murder of Mohammed Saleem ===
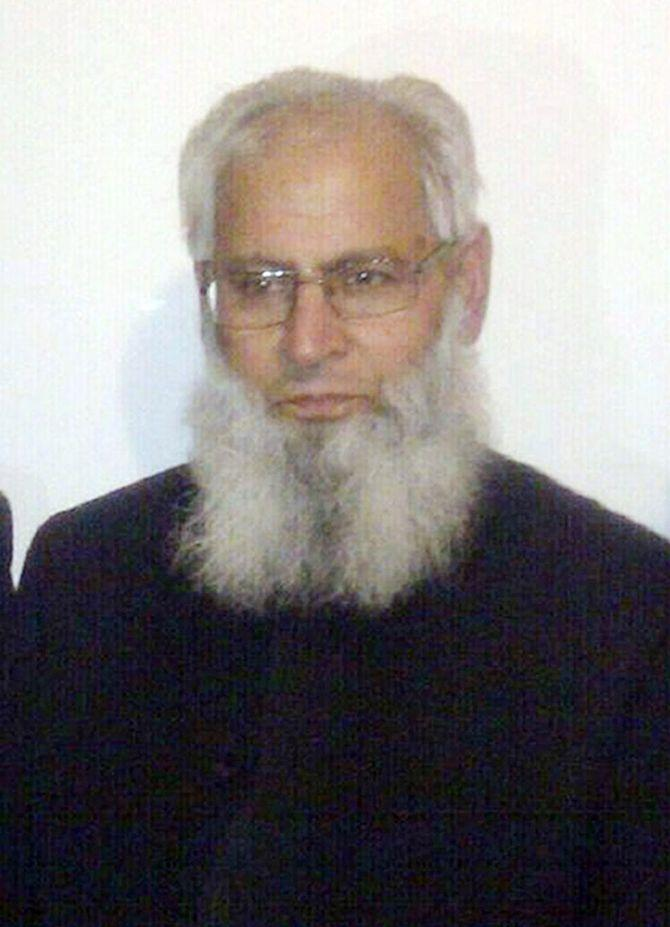
The victim, Mohammed Saleem

At around 10 pm on 29 April 2013, five days after his arrival in the United Kingdom, Lapshyn stabbed 82-year-old Mohammed Saleem to death as he returned from Green Lane Mosque in Small Heath. Saleem, who had emigrated to the United Kingdom from Pakistan in 1957, had been walking alone near his Small Heath home when he was spotted by Lapshyn, who was carrying a knife. Lapshyn later told detectives that he decided to kill Saleem since he "was a Muslim and there were no witnesses." Lapshyn stabbed Saleem three times in the back.

Local opinion was that Saleem had been murdered by a member of the Islamophobic far-right organisation English Defence League (EDL), after six Muslims had been convicted for attempting to bomb one of their rallies. Shazia Khan, a daughter of Saleem, claimed that her brother had received increasingly threatening letters purporting to be from the EDL. One of them stated: "It has come to our attention that you are training terrorists at your premises. We will not tolerate any terrorist activities on our soil. We urge you to close this gym as soon as possible." The letters were said to date from September 2012, before Lapshyn's arrival.

Due to post-mortem investigations, Saleem was not given a funeral until 13 July. Approximately 5,000 attended the service at his mosque.

=== Bombing attempts ===
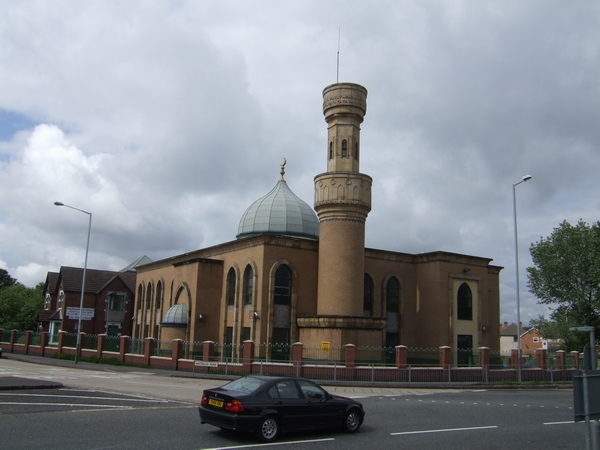
Lapshyn planted his second bomb at Wolverhampton Central Mosque

Lapshyn attempted three bombings on local mosques, targeting Friday lunchtimes as they are the services with highest attendance. The first was laid outside a mosque in Walsall on 21 June 2013, and police investigations led to 40 homes being evacuated. The second was laid outside Wolverhampton Central Mosque on 28 June, but not reported until after the other two because police failed to recognise that a bomb had caused debris on a traffic island near the building until Lapshyn's arrest. Officers were called to the scene after it had detonated on Friday 28 June, but they were not specialists and did not realise the significance of the type of debris. The third bomb was placed in Tipton on 12 July and went off one hour after prayers ended, with no-one injured, which coincided with the funeral of murdered Fusilier Lee Rigby, who was killed by Islamic extremists in an attack at Woolwich, London.

The investigation seized and examined thousands of hours of CCTV, much of it from commercial premises along the exit route and were able to pick out a suspect, going to and from the site of the last attack using the bus network. The final journey was to the Small Heath area. Images were publicly broadcast, but no-one called in to identify him. Local officers visited local premises and finally came to Delcam – where Lapshyn was identified and soon after was arrested peacefully.

== Arrest and trial ==
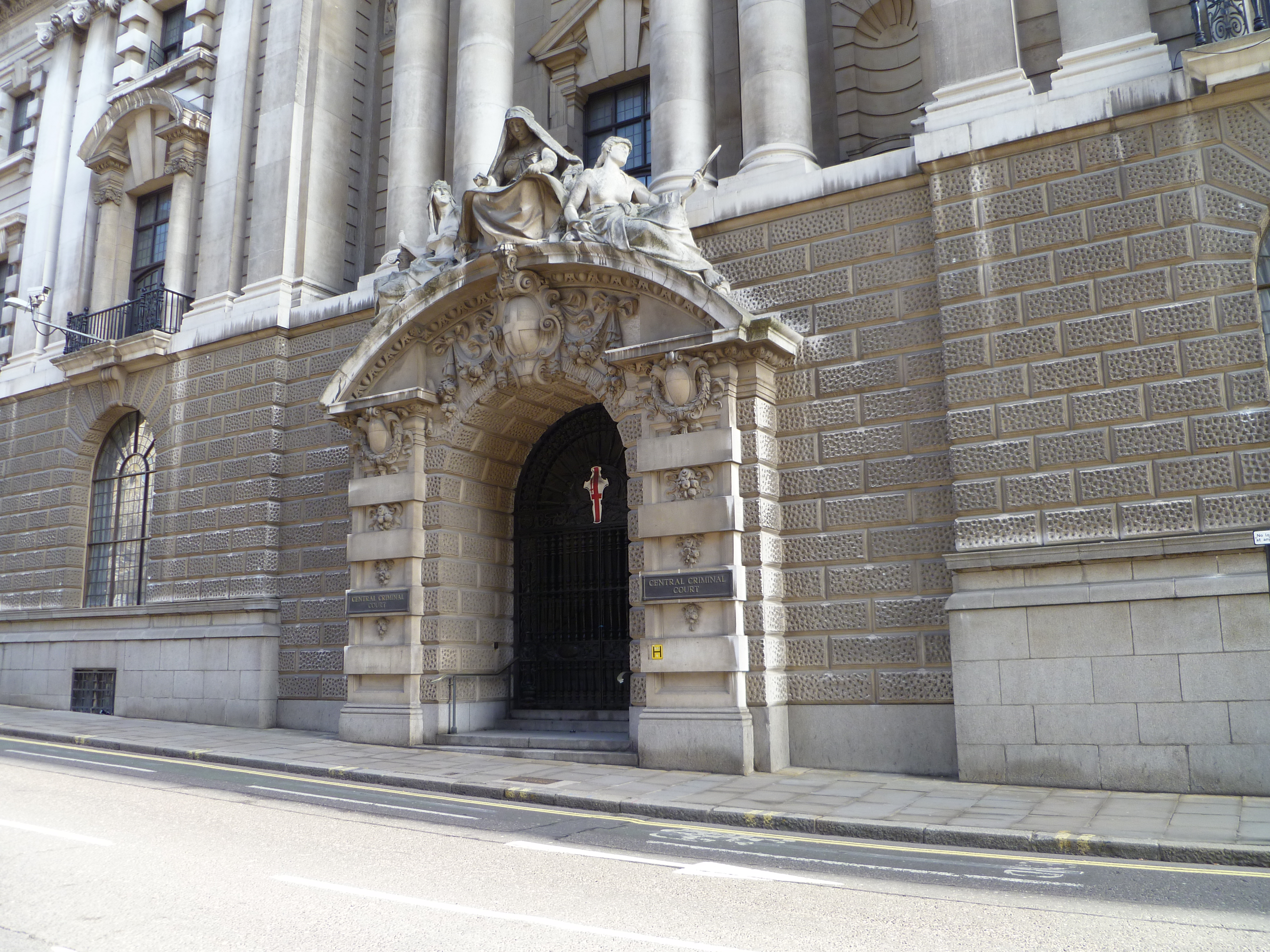
Lapshyn was tried at the Old Bailey in London

Lapshyn was arrested and questioned over the explosions and the murder of Saleem on 18 July 2013. He admitted all the bombings and two days later the murder of Saleem. Lapshyn subsequently stated his intent to "increase racial conflict" via his actions.

For the explosions, he was charged under section 2 of the Explosive Substances Act 1883 and section 5(1) of the Terrorism Act 2006. He pleaded guilty to all charges on 21 October 2013.

Lapshyn was sentenced at the Old Bailey in London on 25 October 2013. The court was cordoned off after a suspicious device was found. Peter Wright QC, prosecuting, said that police searches of Lapshyn's flat had found photographs of him posing with the dagger with which he had killed Saleem, as well as white supremacist literature, including The Turner Diaries, and video games. Wright argued for a whole-life order; however, Lapshyn was sentenced to life in imprisonment, with a minimum term of 40 years, meaning he would not have been eligible for release until 2053.

Hanif Khan, a son-in-law of Saleem, stated after sentencing that "We're in the hands of the judge – 40 years is still a long time and he'll be 65 when he gets out. We've lost a beloved person. Hopefully now we can get some closure".

In August 2020, Lapshyn pleaded guilty to a count of preparing an explosive substance in his cell. He pleaded guilty and was given a two-year jail sentence to run concurrently with his life sentence. It was heard in court that he had been diagnosed with autism since his incarceration.

== Death ==
Twelve years after his crimes and convictions, Lapshyn died at HMP Wakefield on 23 September 2025, at the age of 37. He committed suicide by hanging; the UK Prisons and Probation Ombudsman found that prison staff had "no reason to consider him at imminent risk of suicide and they could not have reasonably foreseen his death".

== Legacy ==
Lapshyn's first name and patronymic, though not his surname, were among many names of many anti-Muslim influences written on the weapons that Brenton Tarrant used during the 2019 Christchurch mosque attacks.

In April 2021, to mark the eighth anniversary of Mohammed Saleem's murder, his daughter Massarrat Saleem started the social media campaign "#IAmMohammedSaleem" with the aim of getting the British government to officially recognise Islamophobia as a crime.
