= Hakkari =

Hakkari or Hakkâri may refer to:

- Hakkari (historical region), a historical region in modern-day Turkey and Iraq
- Hakkâri (city), a city and the capital of Hakkâri Province, Turkey
- Hakkâri Province, a province in southeast Turkey
- Hakkâri District, district in Hakkâri Province
  - Hakkari (electoral district), an electoral district Grand National Assembly of Turkey
- Emirate of Hakkâri, a historical Kurdish emirate
