= Buhriz =

Buhriz بهرز
- Location within Iraq
- Coordinates: 33°42′N 44°40′E
- Country: Iraq
- Governorate: Diyala
- Municipality: Ba'quba District

Population (2015)
  - Total: 35,400

Buhriz (Arabic: بهرز) is an Iraqi town of about 35,400 located 25 miles (40 km) north of Baghdad and 6 miles (9.5 km) south of the major city of Baqubah.

== Background ==
The town of Buhriz is heavily agricultural, located on fertile land along the Diyala River and engaged in the cultivation of date palms, orange trees, and other crops.

The town has an old market that lies near the small river of Sariah (Khuraisan), and it sells all kind of local fruit & vegetables. Close to the market are two of the oldest mosques in Diyala province: The Big Mosque and Abu Al Gaith Mosque. Not far from it are 3 quaint local tea bars. or as locals call it (Gahwa), where usually people sit and have a nice cup of tea and chit chat about their days, and also it's a place to gather and watch matches of football.

It maintains a rural character despite its proximity to Baqubah and Baghdad, with many residents living in traditional mud huts with some concrete-block houses. The town was known under the regime of Saddam Hussein as the home of many members of the Ba'ath Party, as well as being particularly conservative with traditional religious and tribal values predominate. Following the U.S.-led invasion of Iraq in 2003, Buhriz emerged as a flashpoint for guerrilla fighters opposed to the Coalition troops and their Iraqi allies. It became the scene of repeated battles between U.S. forces and rebels throughout the spring and summer of 2004, essentially falling under guerrilla control. Local leaders blame the detention of over 200 Buhriz residents as provoking further hostility.

Yet in a change of events in April 2007, and after the town was taken by al-Qaeda, the locals of the town had an agreement with the U.S. force in the area; it simply stated that they're going to help Americans kill and capture all of those who are associated with Al-Qaeda, in exchange U.S. forces will help them return safely to their homes that were taken by Al-Qaeda; this was the beginning of a great change in the balance of forces that led eventually to the full control over Diyala province by U.S. and Iraqi forces.

== History ==
Buhriz may be the site of the medieval city of Bajisra. Its modern name is probably in honor of Mujahid ad-Din Buhriz, the engineer who in made the last serious effort to repair and re-open the nearby Nahrawan Canal in 1140.

== Notable people ==
- Noor Sabri, Iraqi football goalkeeper.
