= 2008 Baquba bombings =

Terrorist incident in Baquba, Iraq

15 July 2008 Baquba bombings
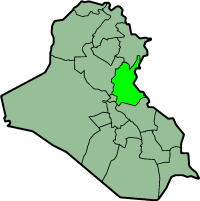
- Location: Baquba, Iraq
- Date: 15 July 2008 (UTC+3)
- Target: al-Saad army camp
- Attack type: suicide bombings
- Deaths: 35
- Injuries: 63

The 15 July 2008 Baquba bombings occurred at around 8am local time on 15 July 2008, in Baquba, Diyala Governorate, targeting army recruits at the al-Saad army camp. According to the Iraqi army, the bombers – one dressed in an Iraqi military uniform, the other in civilian clothing – mingled with the crowds of over 200 young recruits before blowing themselves up, killing 35 and injuring 63.

== See also ==
- List of terrorist incidents in 2008
