= Musayyib =

Town in Babil Governorate, Iraq

Musayyib المسيب
- Location in Iraq
- Coordinates: 32°46′43″N 44°17′24″E
- Country: Iraq
- Governorate: Babil

Population (2018)
  - Total: 57,300

Musayyib (Arabic: المسيب) is an increasing majority Shia Arab town in the Babil Province, Iraq. As of 2018, its population was 57,300. Musayyib sits on both the east and west banks of the Euphrates River, which splits into the Hindiya and Hilla branches just south of the city. Musayyib's municipal government has heavy representation from the Office of the Martyr Sadr, the political wing of Moqtada Sadr's Militia. There is a small minority representation by the Badr Corps as well.

The city has had its occurrences of violence since the start of Operation Iraqi Freedom in March 2003. Most notably, the city experienced two large truck bombs - one on the Musayyib Bridge, which links Baghdad to Karbala, in late 2004 and one in the town center in 2005 that killed 90 people. Musayyib also saw the largest combat operation the US Army's 4th Infantry Division fought during its tour of duty in 2006. In July 2006, elements of the Mahdi Militia attacked a US patrol in the city after a dispute between the local Iraqi Police and Militia members. Elements of the 1st Battalion, 67th Armor Regiment, backed by the 2nd Battalion, 4th Brigade, 8th Iraqi Army Division and Iraqi Police Special Forces, counterattacked the defending militia members in the city and wrested control, killing 33 militiamen.

Musayyib Hospital is the main hospital for the entire Musayyib District and one of two that accommodate overnight stays. The US Army made major renovations to the hospital in December 2006, including upgrading its emergency and surgical rooms. The Women's and Children's Hospital sees 200 patients daily and on any given night there are 50 overnight patients. The most common ailments for children are chest infections and diarrhea. Minors receive free care and women pay 500 dinars for a ticket Many hospitals say that medical care is free because patients only have to provide a ticket, however the tickets usually cost 500 dinars.

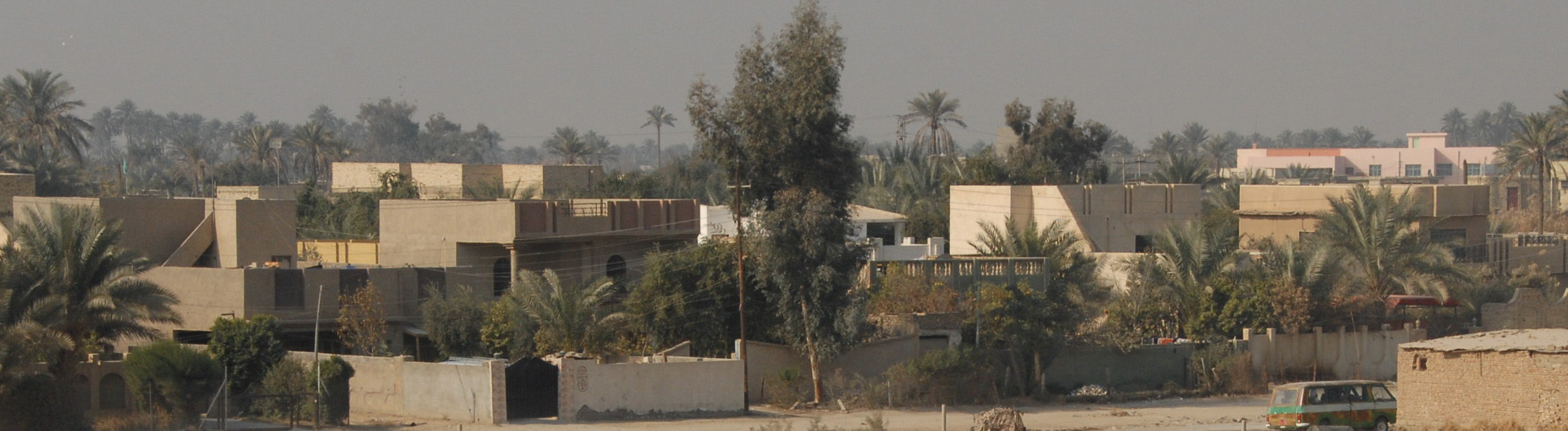
Landscape of Musayyib

Important civil engineering projects and factories in and around Musayyib include the Musayyib Power Plant, a chemical power plant employing approximately 1,000 Iraqis from the local area and an important bridge over the Euphrates that was partially destroyed in 2004 but reopened in 2006. South of Musayyib can be found the Hindiya Barrage. Awlād Muslim Mosque is located in the city.

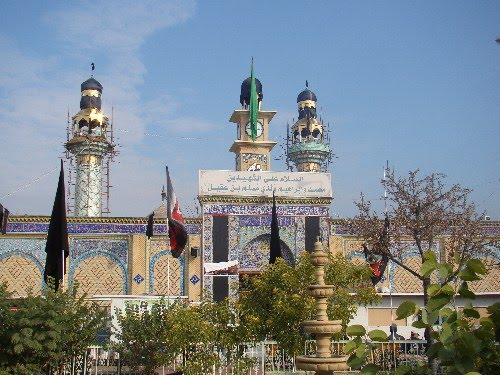
Awlad Muslim Mosque

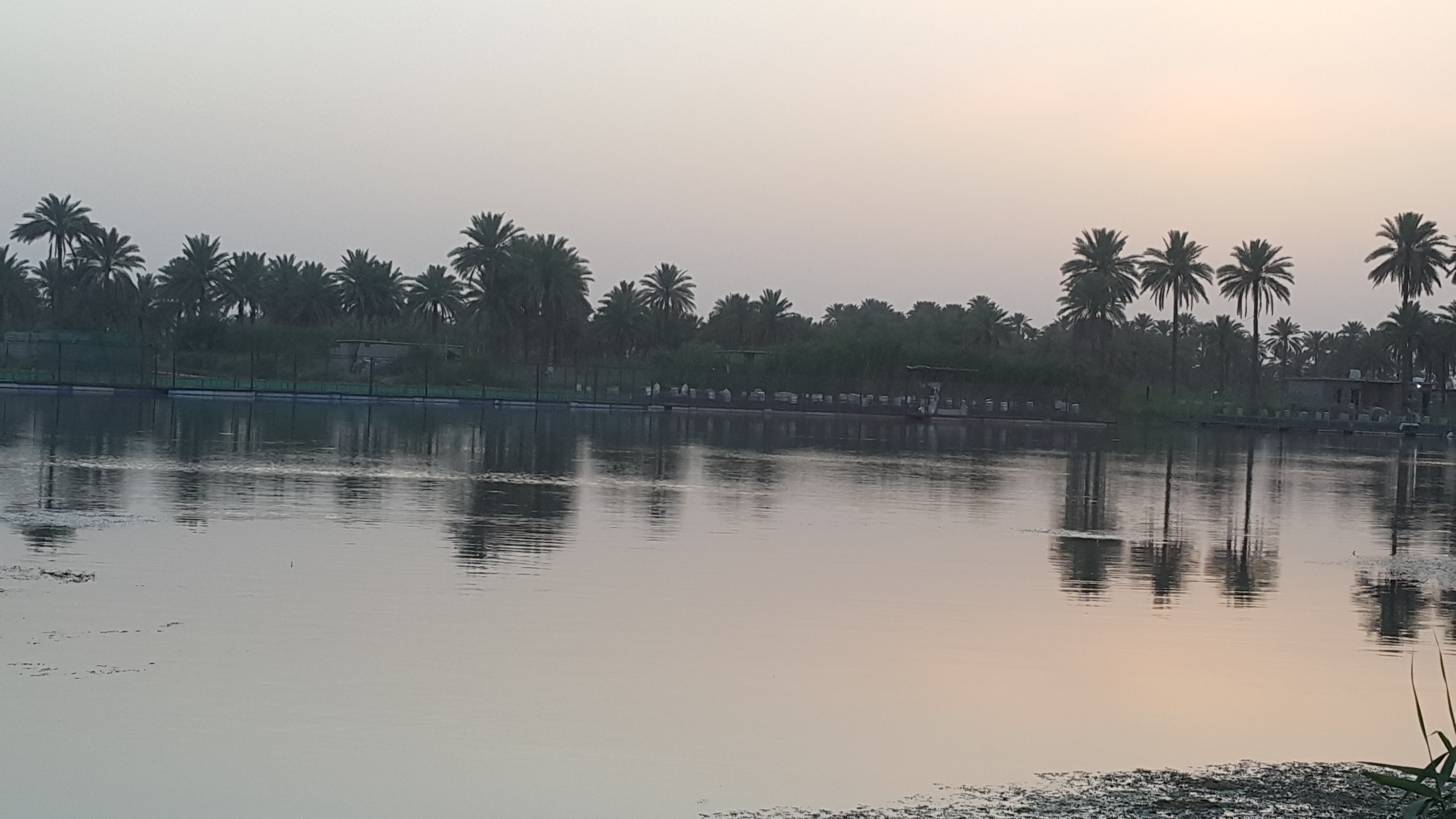
The Euphrates flowing through Al-Musayyib

== See also ==
- Said ibn al-Musayyib
- Triangle of Death (Iraq)
