= Tuz Khurmatu =

Tuz Khurmatu Arabic: طوز خورماتو
- City
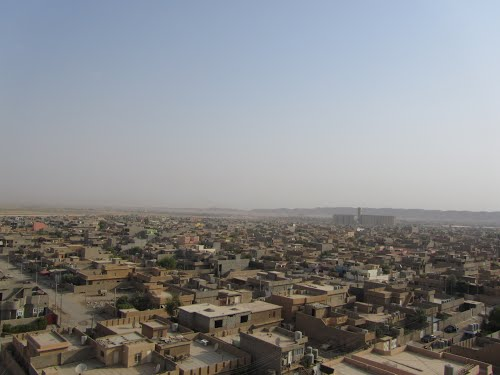

- Tuz Khormato's location in Iraq
- Coordinates: 34°53′N 44°38′E
- Country: Iraq
- Province: Saladin
- District: Tooz
- Elevation: 715 ft (218 m)

Population (2012)
  - Total: 119,000
- Time zone: UTC+3

Tuz Khurmatu (Arabic: طوزخورماتو, Turkish: Tuzhurmatu, Kurdish: دووز خورماتوو, romanized: Dûz Xurmatû, also spelled as Tuz Khurma and Tuz Khormato) is the central city of Tooz District in Saladin Governorate, Iraq, located 55 miles (89 km) south of Kirkuk. Its inhabitants are predominantly Shia Turkmen, with a minority of Arabs and Sunni Kurds.

== Etymology ==
The name of the city is in the local Iraqi Turkmen dialect, meaning salt and dates.

== History ==
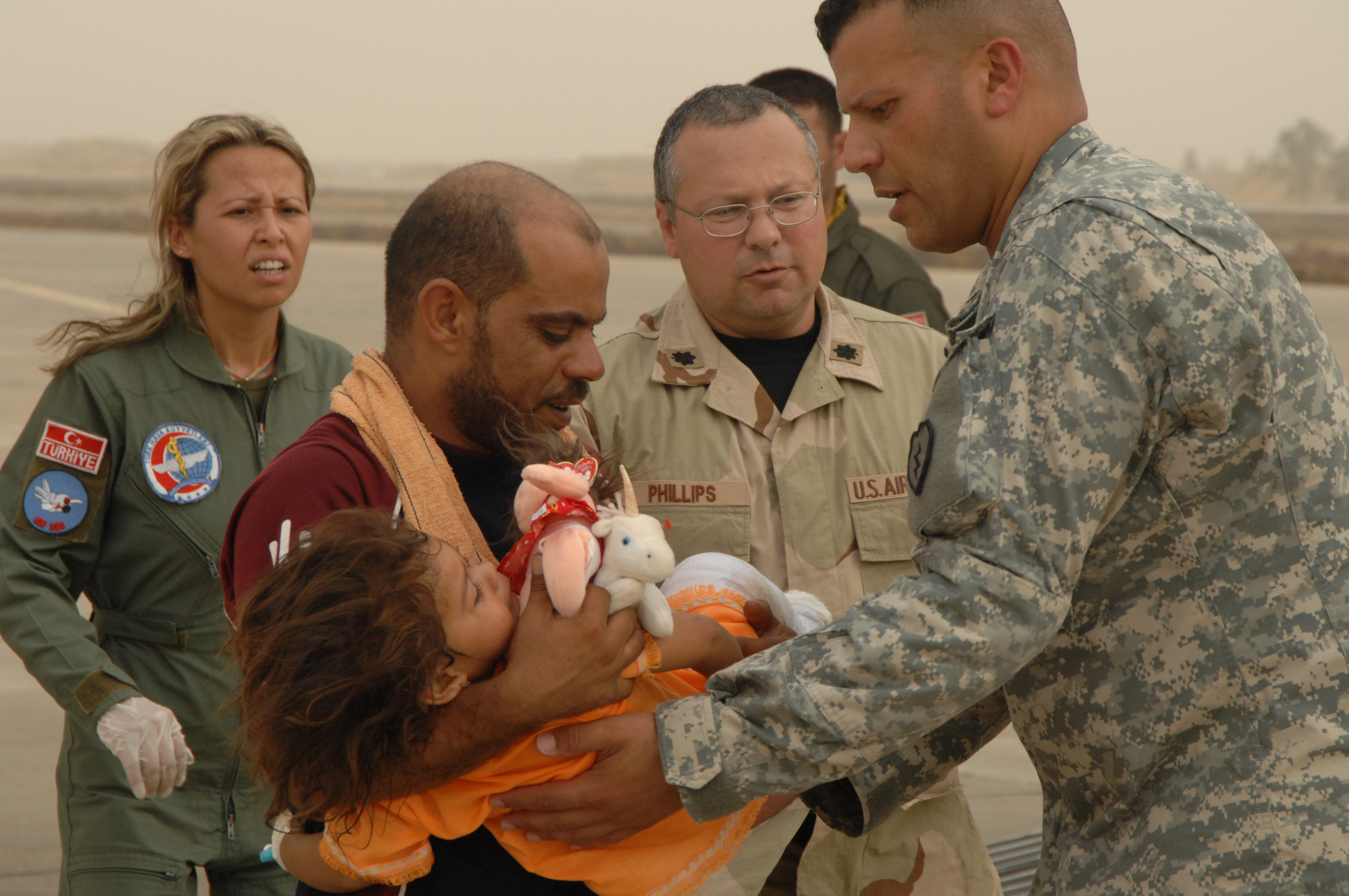
A U.S. Army Soldier and a Turkish Air Force member transport an Iraqi child to safety during a multinational humanitarian airlift effort on Kirkuk Air Base, Iraq, July 8, 2007. The victim was hurt in an attack in Tuz Khurmatu.

Naphtha, oil and asphalt was found in the town in the 18th century.

The city was populated by both Kurds and Turkmens in the 19th century, during the era of Ottoman Iraq. Claudius Rich visited the town in 1820 and stated that the town had a population of 50,000. In 1882 Major General Gerard visited the town and stated that the town had a bazaar, 300 houses, 100 regulars and 30 zaptiyehs.

John Gordon Lorimer visited Tuz Khurmatu in 1912, stating that the town consists of about 600 houses and around 3,000 inhabitants, and that some 20 households are Jews, with the rest being Turks who have been settled here from old.

The town was captured by United Kingdom in May 1918 and were met with joy from the locals. The local Hamawand tribe would offer their assistance to secure the area.

In 1925, Tuz Khurmatu’s population was entirely Turkmen, except for some Jewish families (35 out of 405 families).

40% of the population was Kurdish in the 1947 census.

In 1991, Tooz District was separated from Kirkuk Governorate and attached to Saladin Governorate for Arabization purposes. The population of the town was 75,737 the subsequent year, and decreased to 51,998 in 1987. The town participated in the 1991 Iraqi uprising before being suppressed by the Ba'athist Iraqi army.

=== Operation Iraqi Freedom ===
- On June 2, 2005, at least 12 people were killed and at least 40 wounded in an explosion targeting a restaurant.
- On June 23, 2005, a car bomb detonated by remote control hit an Iraqi police patrol, killing one policeman and wounding 7 civilians.
- On September 20, 2005, insurgents detonated a car bomb targeting Shiite worshippers as they were exiting the Hussainiyat al-Rasoul al-Azam mosque, killing at least 10 and wounding 21 others.
- On March 14, 2007, a suicide bomber struck a market and killing 8 and wounding 25.

=== Operation New Dawn ===
- On September 7, 2010, the first US casualties after President Barack Obama declared an end to US combat operations took place near the city when Iraqi insurgents killed 2 US military personnel.

=== Post-U.S. withdrawal and Iraqi Civil War ===
- On October 27, 2012, a car bombing next to a building owned by a Shi'ite endowment killed two civilians and injured ten others.
- On December 17, 2012, two consecutive car bombings hit a residential area near the city's General Hospital, killing 11 civilians and injuring 45 others. The attacks were part of a country-wide wave of violence that killed almost 100 people in a single day.
- On January 16, 2013, a suicide car bombing at the offices of the Kurdistan Democratic Party killed 5 and injured 40 others.
- On January 23, 2013, a suicide bomber blew himself up during a funeral for a politician's relative in the city, killing 42 and leaving 75 others wounded.
- In November 2015, the town experienced clashes between the Kurdish Peshmerga and Shia Popular Mobilization Forces that claimed 11 lives, wounded over 20 people, and damaged over 200 houses through arson committed by both sides. A truce was reached soon after.
- On November 28, 2015, an IS suicide bomber bombed a town checkpoint, killing 6.

== See also ==
- Tuz Khurmatu Air Base
- White Flags
