= Baqubah =

Baqubah بَعْقُوبَة
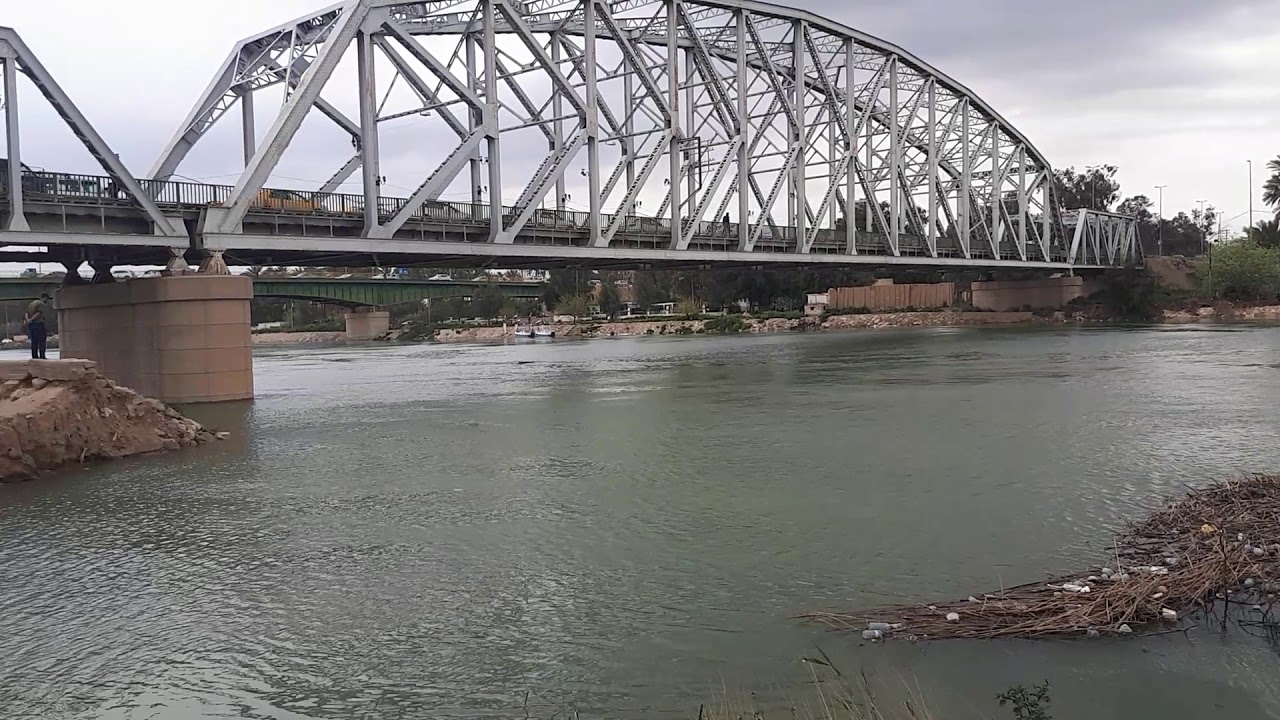
- Bridge on the Diyala River
- Nickname: (The house of Punishment) بيت العقوبة
- Baqubah location within Iraq
- Coordinates: 33°45′N 44°38′E
- Country: Iraq
- Governorate: Diyala Governorate

Population (2024)
  - Total: 377,000

Baqubah (Arabic: بَعْقُوبَة; BGN: Ba‘qūbah; also spelled Baquba and Baqouba) is the capital of the Diyala Governorate of Iraq. The city is located some 50 km (31 mi) to the northeast of Baghdad, on the Diyala River. In 2025 the population of the Baqubah metro area reached 377,000. While some sources say that Baqubah's total population is 600,000.

Baqubah served as a way station between Baghdad and Khorasan on the medieval Khorasan Road. During the Abbasid Caliphate, it was known for its date and fruit orchards, irrigated by the Nahrawan Canal. It is now known as the centre of Iraq's commercial orange groves.

== Districts ==
Baqubah consists of many neighborhoods and areas. At the heart of the city is Baqubah Al-Jadidah (New Baqubah) and Old Baqubah, which is a historical site for many visitors. In the west lies the Yarmouk District, while the east contains Al Tahrir and Shafta.

From the 1960s until the 1980s, the Federal Government of Iraq distributed land and housing at low prices—or even for free—depending on employment. Examples include:

- "دور الضباط" (Officers' Quarters): where old officers and generals reside.
- "حي المعلمين و حي المهندسين" (Teachers' and Engineers' District): formed for civil engineers, oil engineers, and teachers.

== History ==
Baqubah's name originates from the Aramaic words "Bet" (house) and "aquba" (Guardian or Punishment) meaning "The house of Punishment/The Guardian's house". Then It was Simplified To "باعقوبا" (Baquba) and finally into "بعقوبة" (Baqubah). The city was used as a refugee camp for Assyrian refugees fleeing the Assyrian genocide. A refugee camp was set up outside the city, which accommodated between 40,000 and 50,000 refugees.

The camp set up by the British mandate government in Iraq housed Assyrians and Armenians following the 1915 Sayfo and Armenian genocide by the Ottoman Empire. The camp was ruled by military authority and the later Assyrians living in the camp were recruited to serve in the Iraq Levies.

=== Medieval history ===
Baqubah was probably founded during the Sasanian period.

At the time of the Abbasid caliphate, Baqubah lay on the Nahrawan canal, at the end of the canal's Great Qātūl stage and the beginning of its Tāmarrā stage. Although the main road heading east to Khorasan from Baghdad bypassed Baqubah during this period, passing instead through the city of Jisr Nahrawan, it was Baqubah and not Jisr Nahrawan that was the capital of the Upper Nahrawan district.

However, the succeeding Seljuk sultans neglected to dredge the Nahrawan canal or otherwise maintain it, and by the time of Yaqut al-Hamawi in the early 1200s, the canal had completely silted up and the lands it had once watered had gone out of cultivation. By the 14th century, Hamdallah Mustawfi wrote that Jisr Nahrawan was in ruins, and the road to Khorasan now passed through Baqubah instead. Baqubah was the main town in the Tarīq-i-Khurāsān district, and it was surrounded by fertile orchards that produced large crops of oranges and pomelos.

In Yaqut's time, Baqubah was a flourishing town, with several public baths and mosques, as well as a market. The land around Baqubah was densely covered in irrigated orchards, whose dates and lemons were proverbial for their excellence.

=== Modern history ===
In the early 1800s, Baqubah was surrounded by date palm groves, as well as orchards producing lemons, pomegranates, and other fruits. In 1820, Baqubah is described as being home to 2,000 people, of whom almost half were Shi'ite. It had a bazaar and two small mosques.

In the early 1820s, though, the Kurdish army of Mohammad Ali Mirza, governor of Kermanshah, occupied Baqubah and destroyed much of it. A decade later, it was still in ruins. By 1845, the bazaar and one of the mosques were functioning again, and local agriculture was flourishing. By the early 1870s, the Ottoman civil administration had managed to restore stability to the region, and Baqubah became increasingly prosperous. Around the turn of the century, one European traveler described its connections to emerging networks of world commerce:

"The heart of the town is formed by a small bazaar with many fruits and vegetables, American coffee, Indian tea, French sugar and English textiles, in addition to the usual native products. But the bazaar is surrounded by a wide district of expansive gardens with characteristic gate-cottages, and at the eastern exit from the town there is a large and handsome caravansary that is full of Shi'ite pilgrims almost throughout the year."

— Ernst Herzfeld, 1907

=== Baqubah Refugee Camp (1918–1920) ===
During World War I, Baqubah became the site of one of the largest humanitarian relief operations of the era. Following the Assyrian genocide and the Armenian genocide perpetrated by the Ottoman Empire, tens of thousands of refugees fled across the Asadabad Pass toward British-controlled territory in Mesopotamia.

In September 1918, the British military administration established a massive, highly organized refugee camp just outside Baqubah along the Diyala River.

- Population: The camp accommodated between 40,000 and 50,000 refugees, roughly split between Assyrians (mainly from the Hakkari mountains and Urmia plains) and Armenians (chiefly from the Lake Van region).
- Administration: Commanded by British Brigadier-General Herbert Henry Austin, the site was run by military authority and guarded by over 3,000 British and Indian personnel, including the 1/4th Battalion Devonshire Regiment.
- Infrastructure: The camp utilized thousands of military-grade E.P. (European Private) tents, each holding up to 25 people. It featured its own camp hospitals, sanitation infrastructure, and schools where younger children were taught geography and literacy.
- The Iraq Levies Forces: Due to the strategic and military background of many highlander Assyrian tribesmen in the camp, the British military actively recruited a large number of the male refugees directly from the camp into the Iraq Levies Forces.

The camp faced severe logistical challenges, particularly during the autumn of 1918 when torrential rains turned the dirt tracks into deep mud, paralyzing the ox-carts used for food rationing and medical evacuations. The site remained active until late 1920 when repatriation and resettlement efforts began.

=== Recent history ===
During the course of the US-led occupation of Iraq, Baquba emerged as the scene of some of the heaviest guerrilla activity, along with the Sunni enclaves of Fallujah and Ramadi. It was the site of the heaviest fighting during the June 24, 2004, insurgent offensive. Al-Tawhid Wal-Jihad, led by Abu Musab al-Zarqawi, took responsibility for the attacks.

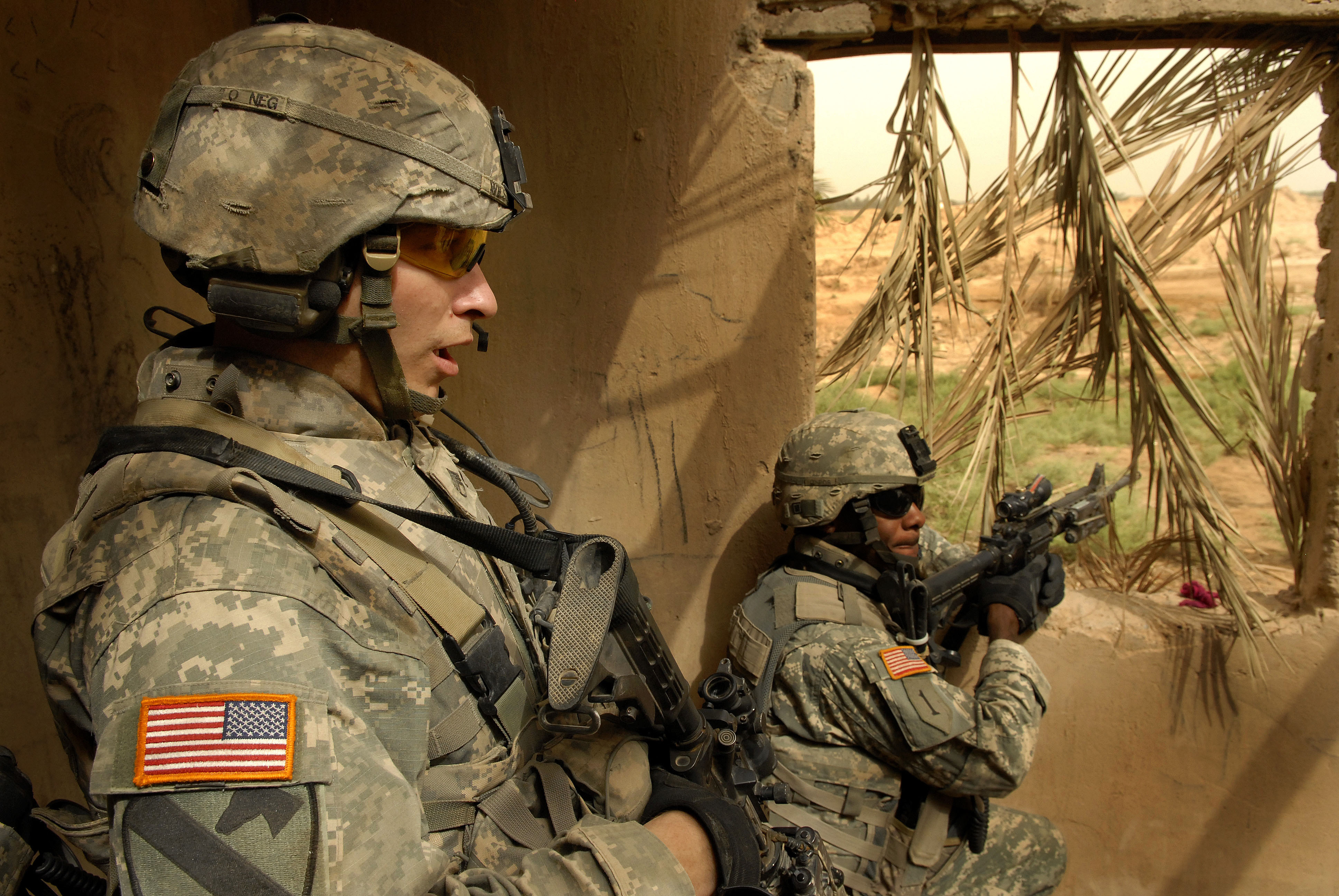
U.S. Army provides security during a mission near Baqubah, June 2, 2007

In a setback for insurgents, Iraqi and U.S. officials confirmed on June 7, 2006, that Zarqawi had been killed in an airstrike and subsequent raid 8 km (5.0 mi) north of Baquba. During late 2006, however, Baqubah and majority of Diyala Governorate were reported to have come under Sunni insurgent control. On January 3, 2007 the previous Iraqi government in Baquba was reported to have fallen, leaving the city in the hands of insurgents fighting against the American led coalition in Operation Iraqi Freedom. During this time, the city was reportedly under the control of the Islamic State of Iraq.

In January 2007, it was reported that Sunni insurgents were able to kidnap the mayor and blow up his office, despite promises from American and Iraqi military officials that the situation in the city was "reassuring and under control". The city at its peak had over 460,000 residents, but a February 2007 report labeled the city a "ghost town" as residents either fled criminal and sectarian violence or remained in hiding at home.

On August 10, 2015, a suicide car bombing near Baqubah killed 30 and wounded 40 people. IS claimed responsibility for the attack.

==== Attacks during the Iraq War ====
The following is a list of deadly attacks in the city including the death of al-Zarqawi and after.

- July 9, 2003, SFC Dan "Gabe" Gabrielson of the 652nd Engineer Company (MRBC) was killed in an insurgent ambush.
- July 26, 2003 SPC Jonathan Barnes, SGT Daniel Methvin, and SPC Wilfredo Perez were killed and another soldier was critically injured in a grenade attack from inside the Baqubah women and children's hospital they were guarding at the time.
- August 11, 2003 SSG David Perry of the 649th MP Company was killed while inspecting a suspicious package outside Diyala Provincial Police Headquarters. The package was an Improvised Explosive Device (IED) in disguise. The 649th MPs were living at the police station and training Iraqi Police
- November 20, 2003 Capt. George Wood was killed in action while on patrol in Baqubah, Iraq when his vehicle hit an explosive.
- December 25, 2003, SSG Thomas Christensen and SSG Stephen Hattamer, of the 652nd Engineer Company (MRBC), were killed in a mortar attack on Camp Gabe on the outskirts of Baqubah.
- December 26, 2003, Ssgt Michael Sutter, of 745th Ordinance Company of 79th Ord Battalion died while disarming two IEDs along the Diyalah canal, near Baqubah Police Hq garrisoned by the 649th MP company who were instrumental in the recovery of the soldier several days later.
- March 10, 2004, SPC Bert Hoyer, of the 652nd Engineer Company (MRBC) was killed by an IED outside Camp Warhorse.
- April 8–13, 2004: Mahdi Militia and Ansar al-Sunnah attempt to overtake the city. American tanks and Bradleys patrol the streets and Artillery and Air Force bombs dropped inside the city limits.
- June 8, 2004. United States Army Captain Humayun Khan ran towards a taxi that was speedily approaching the guard post he was inspecting. Its driver detonated a bomb before the taxi could hit the post or a nearby mess hall, where hundreds of soldiers were eating breakfast. Khan was posthumously awarded the Bronze Star and Purple Heart.
- June 24, 2004, Capt. Christopher Cash and Spec.4 Daniel Desens Jr, of A Co 1-120th INF BN, North Carolina National Guard, were killed in action during attacks by a large well-coordinated insurgent force attempting to take key points around the city.
- June 7, 2006: A U.S. airstrike kills Abu Musab al-Zarqawi, the former leader of Al-Qaeda in Iraq, near Baqubah, northeast of Baghdad.
- June 26, 2006: At least 25 people are killed in a bicycle bombing in the city, according to police.
- October 3, 2006: In a string of deadly attacks, gunmen open fire on a Shia family fleeing the city, killing five of them. Ten others are killed in shooting and bombing incidents, and 10 bodies are found in the city, the apparent victims of sectarian slayings.
- October 26, 2006: Insurgents ambush a police unit, killing 24 policemen and one civilian. Eight insurgents are killed in subsequent fighting with police and U.S. troops, the military says.
- November 12, 2006: Fifty bodies are found dumped behind the offices of the provincial electric company, according to the Iraqi army's provincial public affairs office.
- November 29, 2006: Fighting between police and insurgents after an attack on Baqubah's police headquarters shuts down the city, closing the university, schools and most stores, and clearing the streets of everyone, except a few who scurry about to stock up on food. At least 55 militants are killed in clashes in the preceding days, according to anonymous police sources.
- November 30, 2006: The U.S. military says Iraqi forces find 28 bodies in a mass grave south of Baqubah, following days of heavy fighting that killed scores of people in and around the city.
- December 2, 2006: U.S. and Iraqi forces begin an offensive in the city in response to fighting that raged for a week between Sunni insurgents and police. Ahmed Fuad, a senior morgue official, said the morgue received 102 bodies in the previous two weeks.
- December 3, 2006: Some 16 bodies – apparent victims of sectarian death squads – are found.
- December 29, 2006: Ten bodies showing signs of torture are found dumped on the streets of the city, police and morgue officials say.
- August 6, 2007: A bomb detonates in a house, killing 3 US soldiers, 1 of whom was Kareem Rashad Sultan Khan.
- June 22, 2008: A female suicide bomber detonated a powerful explosive device outside a government outpost and courthouse. 15 were killed in the blast.
- July 15, 2008: Two suicide bombers target army recruits, killing 35 and injuring 50. See: 15 July 2008 Baquba bombings
- October 8, 2008: A female suicide bomber detonates at the central court house, killing nine (including five Iraqi soldiers) and wounding 17.
- October 16, 2008: A mortar attack occurred. Three rockets fired into FOB (Forward operating base) Warhorse from nearby Baqubah kill 2 US Army soldiers, PFC Cody J. Eggleston, and PFC Heath K. Pickard. Both were awarded the Alaska Decoration of Honor. They both were assigned to 1st Platoon, C-CO, 1st Battalion, 5th Infantry Regiment, 1st Brigade Combat Team, 25th Infantry Division, Fort Wainwright, Alaska.
- March 3, 2010: Suicide attacks killed at least 31 people and injured dozens more in three separate suicide bombings. The third explosion attacked the city's main hospital, where the victims of the first two attacks were being treated.
- June 14, 2011: A team of six gunmen and suicide bombers dressed in police uniforms attacked Diyala provincial council's offices in the center of Baqubah. The assault began about 9:20 a.m. with a suicide car bomb attack at the gates of the Diyala provincial council's headquarters. As police officers and Iraq Security Forces (advised by US Army Special Forces) rushed to the scene, other militants attacked a second checkpoint, one detonating a suicide vest and the others spraying guards and civilians with gunfire. Four civilians and three police officers reported killed. Five of the attackers were also killed, and one was captured.

==== Operation Arrowhead Ripper ====
On June 19, 2007, U.S. forces launched a large-scale operation against Sunni militants in Baquba. The offensive, Operation Arrowhead Ripper, involved approximately 10,000 coalition soldiers.

=== Lingering legacy of Ba'ath Party and Saddam Hussein ===
Along with the city of Fallujah, Baqubah has kept the names of monuments and mosques named after some of the most controversial officers and campaigns of the Baath Party. For example, still today, a large mosque named after Adnan Khairallah is found in the city. There is also an Izzat Ibrahim mosque in Baqubah (and another one in its satellite town of Buhriz), named likewise after a high officer of Saddam Hussein. Furthermore, Baqubah also hosts a mosque named the Anfal mosque, which echoes the name of the Anfal Campaign, which involved the mass killing of the Kurds under the supervision of Adnan Khairallah. These, like other Baath Party-related names, are controversial among Iraqi Shia and Kurds who lost so many lives to the abuses of the Ba'ath Party, Saddam Hussein and military/security figures like Adnan Khayrullah, Ali Hassan al-Majid and Izzat Ibrahim.

== Climate ==
Baqubah has a hot desert climate (BWh) in the Köppen–Geiger climate classification system. In winter there is more rainfall than in summer. The average annual temperature in Baqubah is 22.8 °C (73.0 °F). About 186 mm (7.32 in) of precipitation falls annually.

Climate data for Baqubah
Month	Jan	Feb	Mar	Apr	May	Jun	Jul	Aug	Sep	Oct	Nov	Dec	Year
Mean daily maximum °C (°F)	16.2 (61.2)	19.0 (66.2)	24.8 (76.6)	30.8 (87.4)	37.4 (99.3)	42.5 (108.5)	45.0 (113.0)	45.3 (113.5)	41.0 (105.8)	34.3 (93.7)	23.8 (74.8)	17.8 (64.0)	31.5 (88.7)
Mean daily minimum °C (°F)	5.9 (42.6)	7.5 (45.5)	11.9 (53.4)	17.2 (63.0)	23.6 (74.5)	29.0 (84.2)	31.7 (89.1)	31.7 (89.1)	27.2 (81.0)	21.6 (70.9)	12.6 (54.7)	7.8 (46.0)	19.0 (66.2)
Average precipitation mm (inches)	39 (1.5)	32 (1.3)	33 (1.3)	20 (0.8)	5 (0.2)	0 (0)	0 (0)	0 (0)	0 (0)	15 (0.6)	34 (1.3)	38 (1.5)	216 (8.5)
Average relative humidity (%)	62	52	33	27	18	13	14	14	17	24	43	56	31
Source: climate-data.org

== Transport ==
Baqubah is connected by highway to Baghdad and Mandali.

== See also ==
- List of places in Iraq
- Al Ba'quba Stadium
- Eshnunna
- Sand Castle (film)
