= 4th Brigade Combat Team, 2nd Infantry Division =

4th BCT, 2nd Infantry Division
- Shoulder sleeve insignia of the 2d Infantry Division
- Active: 2006 – 14
- Country: United States of America
- Branch: United States Army
- Role: Stryker infantry
- Size: Brigade
- Garrison/HQ: Joint Base Lewis-McChord, Washington, U.S.
- Engagements: Iraq; Afghanistan

Insignia
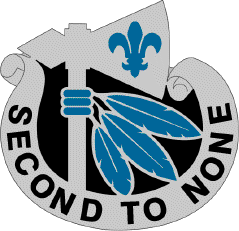
- Identification symbol

The 4th Brigade, 2nd Infantry Division ("Raiders") is an inactive Stryker Brigade Combat Team (SBCT) of the United States Army. The brigade was activated at Fort Lewis, Washington on 1 June 2006 by reflagging the 2nd Stryker Cavalry Regiment. The 4th Stryker Brigade was the last U.S. Army combat brigade to serve in support of Operation Iraqi Freedom. The brigade deployed three times in support of the war on terror, to Iraq from 2007–2008 and from 2009–2010, and to Afghanistan from 2012–2013 before deactivating in March 2014.

== Formation ==
The unit was originally formed at Fort Lewis in February 2005 as the 2nd Cavalry Regiment (Stryker), when the 2nd Armored Cavalry Regiment (Light) moved from Fort Polk, Louisiana, after a 15-month deployment in Iraq. The original command team of 2nd Stryker Cavalry Regiment was COL Jon S. Lehr and CSM John W. Troxell. In June 2006, the 2nd Stryker Cavalry Regiment's colors were cased (to be uncased in Vilseck, Germany, along with a new batch of personnel from Fort Lewis's former 1st Stryker Brigade Combat Team, 25th Infantry Division).

== Units ==
The brigade consisted of the following units: Headquarters and Headquarters Company (HHC), an engineer company, an anti-tank company, a military intelligence company, a signal company, a logistics and support battalion, a field artillery battalion, three infantry battalions, and a cavalry or RSTA (reconnaissance, surveillance, and target acquisition) squadron.

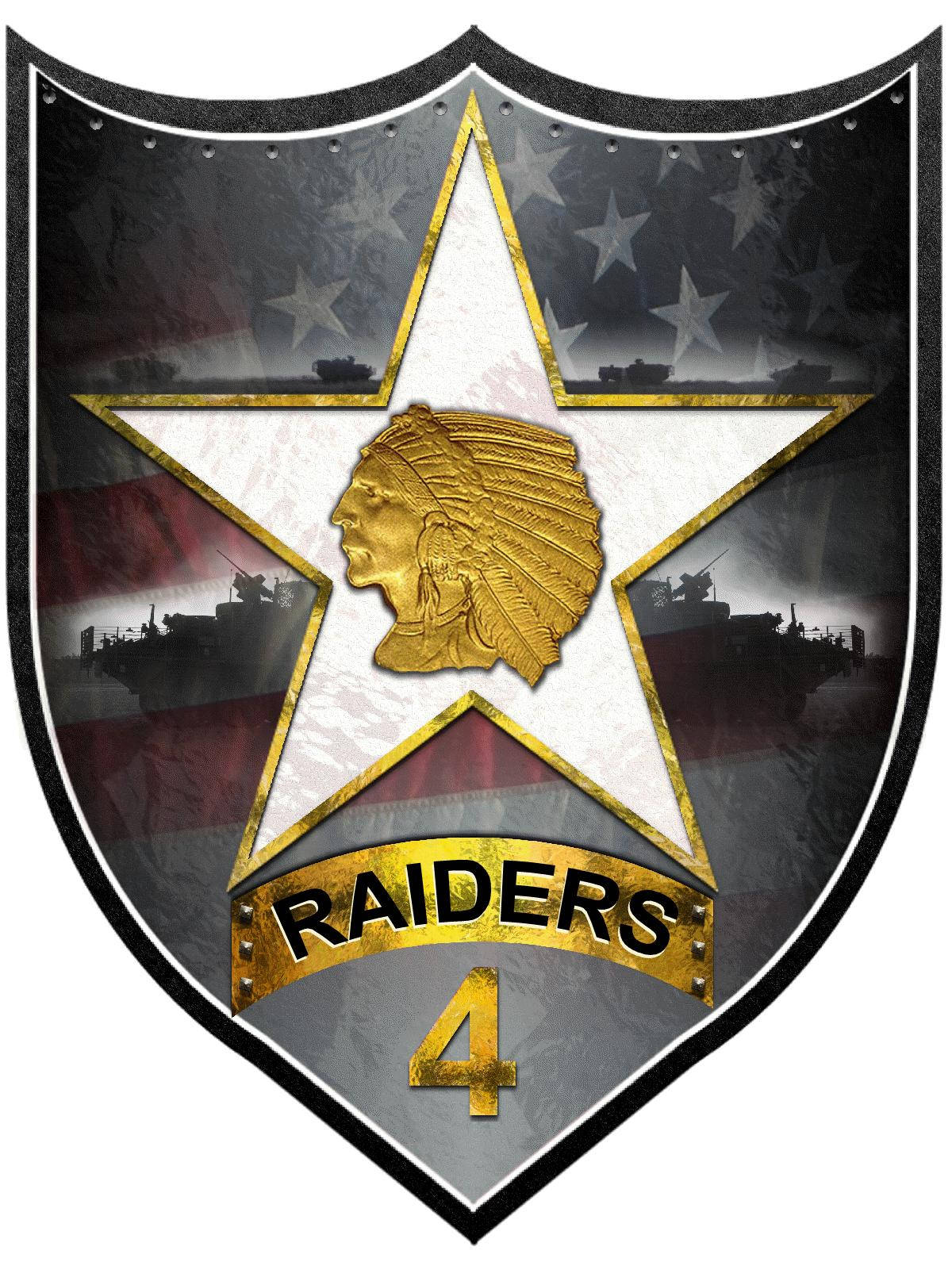
Unofficial brigade insignia

- HHC, 4th SBCT
- "Manchus" 4th Battalion, 9th Infantry Regiment
- "Tomahawk" 2nd Battalion, 23rd Infantry Regiment
- "Rock" 1st Battalion, 38th Infantry Regiment
- "Blackhawk" 2nd Squadron, 1st Cavalry Regiment
- "Vikings" 2nd Battalion, 12th Field Artillery Regiment
- "Forge" 702nd Brigade Support Battalion (originally 202nd Brigade Support Battalion)
- 38th Engineer Company
- F Company, 52nd Infantry Regiment (Anti-tank)
- 45th Military Intelligence Company
- "Digital Dogs" 472nd Signal Company

== History ==
While the brigade was one of the Army's newest, its subordinate battalions had long records of service. The six battalions and four separate companies that composed the brigade have received honors from the Civil War through the First Gulf War that include some twenty Presidential Unit Citations, eight French Croix de Guerre, and nine Republic of Korea Presidential Unit Citations.

Upon activation, the brigade assumed the nickname of "Dragoon Raiders" as a way to highlight the unique capabilities that the Stryker brigade brought to the battlefield. Like the dragoons of the Army's past, the soldiers of the 4th Stryker Brigade Combat Team are mounted infantrymen that possessed superior mobility and the versatility to successfully accomplish a wide range of divergent missions. The unit further adopted the moniker of raiders because of the Stryker brigade's self-sufficiency and ability to strike the enemy quickly and where least expected.

== Garrison operations ==
While preparing for its first deployment, the 4th Stryker Brigade Combat Team made significant contributions to the Army. In addition to supporting the Reserve Officer Training Corps Warrior Forge Program and deploying elements of the 1st Battalion, 38th Infantry Regiment in support of wild-land fire fighting, the brigade was also at the forefront of fielding new systems to enhance Army capabilities. The brigade was the first unit to field the Land Warrior, a digital, man portable system that enhances soldier communications, tracking of friendly forces, and improves overall situational awareness.

== Iraq 2007–08 ==
In April 2007, the brigade deployed to Iraq as part of President George W. Bush's "surge" strategy and became the first Stryker brigade to deploy with all ten variants of the Stryker combat vehicle. During their 15 months deployment of which saw continuous, full-spectrum combat operations, the Raider Brigade successfully conducted nine brigade-level operations and more than 550 battalion- and company-sized operations throughout the Baghdad Northern Belt and in Diyala Province. The brigade's actions, in conjunction with Iraqi Security Forces, defeated Al Qaeda-affiliated insurgents in the brigade's battle space, suppressed Shia extremist militias, bolstered Iraqi civil government and security force capabilities, and protected critical infrastructure. These efforts provided space and time for the Iraqi people to take control of their own destiny and begin the process of reconciliation, rebuilding, and self- government.

Initially, the brigade headquarters, along with the 4th Battalion, 9th Infantry Regiment, 2nd Battalion, 12th Field Artillery Regiment, 202nd Brigade Support Battalion, and Brigade Troops Battalion was located at Camp Taji, north of Baghdad. The 2nd Squadron, 1st Cavalry Regiment remained under Brigade control but operated out of Forward Operating Base Warhorse. The 2nd Battalion, 23rd Infantry Regiment and 1st Battalion, 38th Infantry Regiment were detached conducting operations in Baghdad and later in Baqubah. The brigade area of responsibility included the city of Tarmiyah and the critical Main Supply Route Tampa, the densely populated Sadr City suburb of Husayniyah, and the Khan Bani Sa’ad and canal regions of Diyala Province. Upon the Raider Brigade's assumption of this battle space, Al Qaeda in Iraq basically controlled both Tarmiyah and Khan Bani Sa’ad. In Tarmiyah, insurgents had driven out the local police and destroyed the police station. Militant elements affiliated with Jaysh Al Mahdi strongly influenced Husayniyah to include the Iraqi Police. Around September 7, 2007, the brigade conducted operations to destroy old train station used by the enemy to attacked our Soldiers and were hit by IED during their follow-on mission in the Diyala Province. Safe travel on even major routes required deliberate route clearance because of the scope of the improvised explosive device threat.

From mid-May 2007 through January 2008, the brigade destroyed Al Qaeda affiliated insurgent cells in Baghdad's Northern Belt while keeping Shia extremists under control. Fully utilizing the robust intelligence collection and analysis capabilities organic to the Stryker brigade, Raider Brigade soldiers targeted and dismantled terrorist cells throughout the battle space. Simultaneously, the brigade used sensor-to-shooter operations to conduct surveillance on known IED hotspots and kill the IED emplacement teams.

=== Operation Raider Isolation ===
The brigade also conducted major operations to take control of key terrain across the Northern Belt. During OPERATION RAIDER ISOLATION in June 2007, the Brigade, spearheaded by 2–1 Cavalry, prevented the exfiltration of Al Qaeda fighters from the critical city of Baqubah. These efforts contributed to the success of 3rd Brigade, 2nd Infantry Division's clearance of Baqubah in Operation Arrowhead Ripper. In July 2007, 2–12 Field Artillery put down a Shia extremist uprising in Husayniyah, effectively quarantining the city and ending the uprising with many casualties. Injuries and death had become a very real nightmare within Husayniyah.

=== Operation Raider Riviera ===
Finally, in September 2007, 4–9 Infantry spearheaded Operation Raider Riviera, the deliberate clearing of Tarmiyah, which eliminated Al Qaeda's stranglehold on this city and allowed the establishment of long-term security.

By the time the Raider Brigade transferred control of Tarmiyah and Husayniyah in December 2007, IED activity on Route Tampa had decreased from eight incidents per day to less than three incidents per week. The city of Tarmiyah was clear of terrorists and Al Qaeda's influence on Khan Bani Sa’ad was significantly reduced. The brigade had detained more than five hundred persons, removing insurgents from the region and giving Iraqis a chance to solidify civilian government and security infrastructure. The brigade then shifted its focus to Diyala Province.

As the brigade assumed responsibility for all of Diyala Province, it regained control of 1–38 Infantry and 2–23 Infantry and had attached the 2nd Squadron, 3rd Armored Cavalry Regiment and eventually the 3rd Squadron, 2nd Stryker Cavalry Regiment. In assuming a province, the brigade had to take a much greater role in transitioning Iraqi security forces and partnering with the Government of Iraq. Despite these added responsibilities, the brigade continued to keep the pressure on the enemy, replicating the same intelligence-driven targeting methodology that had proven so successful previously.

=== Operation Raider Reaper and Harvest ===
Additionally, the brigade followed up on previous clearing operations in the Baqubah region by seizing additional areas from Al Qaeda's control. In December 2007, elements of 2–1 Cavalry, 1–38 Infantry and the 5th Iraqi Army Division executed Operation Raider Reaper in the "Iron Triangle" region northwest of Baqubah. This operation freed several villages from Al Qaeda control and allowed for the standup of Sons of Iraq groups. The brigade then shifted focus to the "Bread Basket" area of the Diyala River Valley between the major cities of Dali Abbas and Muqdadiyah. The deliberate clearing of the "Bread Basket" – Operation Raider Harvest – saw 2–23 Infantry and 2/3 Armored Cavalry conducting shaping operations while 3/2 Stryker Cavalry and 5th Iraqi Army Division assets conducted clearing. This operation drove Al Qaeda from the area and freed dozens of villages from terrorist control. The Brigade followed up the success of Operation Raider Harvest with additional operations to clear the regions south of Buhriz and in the Turki region south of the city of Balad Ruz. The brigade further supported Iraqi Army operations to open Route Vanessa in between Baqubah and Khan Bani Sa’ad, a route that had been impassable to security forces.

=== Return to Fort Lewis ===
After 13 months, on 1 June 2008, the Raider Brigade completed its mission in Iraq and transferred authority of Diyala Province. Brigade operations resulted in 1,700 personnel detained and more than 600 insurgents killed or wounded. The brigade's intelligence-driven raids removed more than 200 high-value individuals from the battlefield. Brigade route clearance operations resulted in more than 11,250 kilometers of routes being cleared and the discovery and reduction of 1,295 IEDs. Brigade soldiers found and reduced more than 550 enemy weapons caches.

Upon return from Iraq in June 2008, the brigade began repairing, replacing and fielding new equipment in preparation for their next deployment.

== Iraq 2009–10 ==
On 1 March 2009 Col. John Norris announced that the brigade would be deployed to Iraq in the Fall of 2009, nine months earlier than expected. This acceleration was in response to President Barack Obama's new Afghanistan policy which diverted 5/2 SBCT from Iraq to Afghanistan. The brigade had been accelerated for its last deployment. General Odierno and his staff had identified the need for a Stryker brigade to facilitate the responsible drawdown of American combat forces from Iraq and to leave Iraqi Security Forces (ISF) trained, equipped and capable to protect their people.

Once notified that they would deploy nine months earlier than expected, the Raiders started an intensified training program starting at the individual soldier level and culminating with a company-focused JRTC rotation in June 2009.

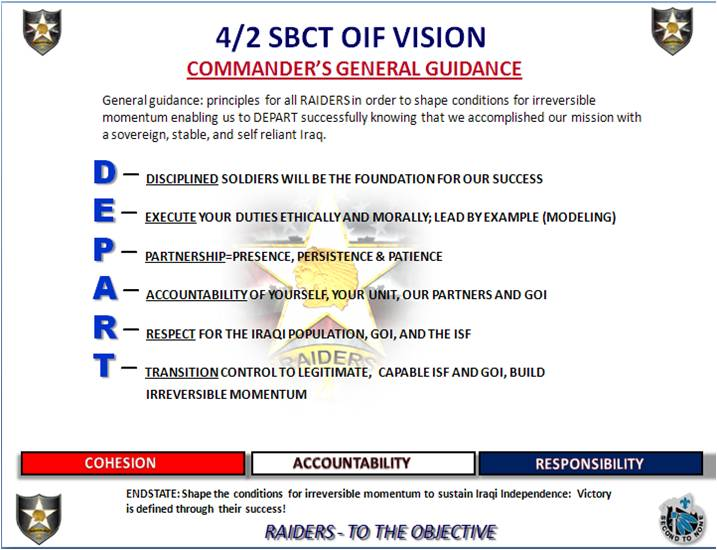
DEPART Card.

After ten-days of training in Kuwait in September 2009, units continued movement north into Iraq. On 28 September 2009, 2nd Brigade, 1st Infantry Division transferred authority of western Baghdad to 4th Brigade, 2nd Infantry Division (4/2 SBCT). Raider soldiers, conducting operations since mid-September, completed familiarization of their new operational environment and Iraqi partners. 4th Brigade's Task Force Viking (consisting of the 2nd Battalion, 12th Field Artillery Regiment reinforced by "F" Company, 52nd Infantry Regiment) partnered with the 6th and 9th Iraqi Army Divisions, the 6th Brigade, 2nd Federal Police Division, local Iraqi Police, and the Sons of Iraq in an area often considered Iraq's "Center of Gravity". TF Viking's AO stretched from the Baghdad International Airport (FOB Victory/Liberty) in the west to the Tigris River in the east (excluding "The Green Zone"), and from Route Irish in the south to the merging of routes Senators and Vernon into Route 1 just outside the town of Taji. This area, in-and-around the contentious Abu Ghraib Qada – previously the "home" of the insurgency – contained more than 2.5 million people (comparable to the city of Baltimore), and contained 18 important Iraqi government buildings (including the Iraqi Parliament) as well as 23 international embassies (to include that of the United States).

=== Iraqi national election ===
The 7 March 2010 national elections demonstrated that ISF could create and execute a comprehensive security plan. With 4/2 SBCT helping to facilitate ISF security operations, 62% of Iraqis turned out to vote despite early morning violence.

=== Responsible reduction of forces ===
As part of the Responsible Drawdown of Forces the brigade transferred five joint security stations to the Iraqi government and downsized two others. To accomplish this mission, units moved concrete barriers, dismantled motor pools and cooking areas, removed gravel and hazardous materials and packed up equipment. Local governments began to build the necessary relationships to bring GOI projects and other help to their areas. ISF began meeting regularly with the tribal sheikhs and local governmental officials to discuss security in their areas.

After seven years of war, the Raiders were the last combat unit to depart Iraq. The brigade inherited two brigades worth of equipment ranging from MRAPs to printers. For nine months, soldiers fixed and cleaned equipment and turned it in for redistribution to units in Iraq, Afghanistan or the United States.

=== Reconstruction- "non-lethal operations" ===
The Raiders, with two embedded provincial reconstruction teams, USAID and the Army Corps of Engineers (USACE), developed reconstruction projects in western Baghdad, Abu Ghraib, Taji, and Tarmiyah. Local governments, Iraqi ministries and tribal leaders identified these projects and, working closely with these groups, the brigade prioritized projects based on the needs of the people. These included repairs of medical clinics and schools, solar lights for neighborhood streets, drinking water pumps and filtration systems, electrical projects, sewage treatment plants, agribusiness and local business grants. In total the brigade completed 83 projects totaling 14.5 million dollars. Including US Department of State and USACE funds the United States spent over $400 million for the reconstruction of Iraq.

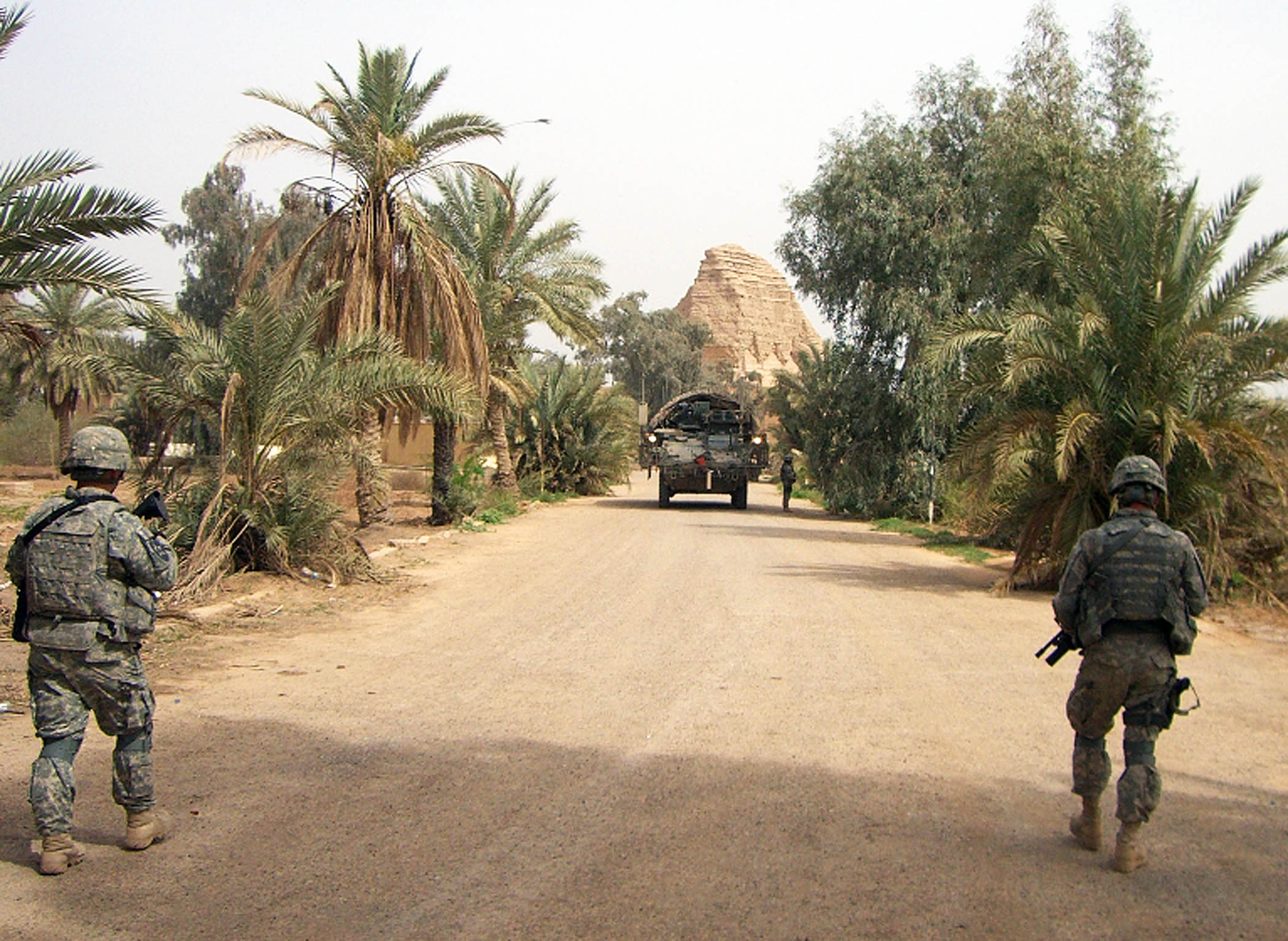
Soldiers of 4th Stryker Brigade Combat Team, 2nd Infantry Division, approach the ziggurat at Aqar Quf

The brigade refurbished 11 schools and provided 23 humanitarian assistance drops of school supplies, clothing and food, helping local under privileged families, children, orphans and teachers with the resources needed for basic education. 4/2 units distributed micro-grants totaling $230,000 to stimulate local businesses in an attempt to improve the local economy. American forces and external agencies focused on agriculture and agribusiness revitalization because this is an important aspect of the Abu Ghraib and Taji areas. The campaign slogan "Grow Crops instead of Terrorists", coined by a local sheikh, helped employ local military-aged males and widows, giving them new employment alternatives to making money through aiding the insurgency.

Money dedicated to this "Brown to Green" initiative helped train farmers on new agricultural technologies like greenhouse farming and irrigation techniques that help conserve water. Contractors established demonstration farms, facilitating this training and providing hands on experience to local farmers. Nearly 300 farmers received greenhouses with drip irrigation systems, seed and fertilizers providing them with the tools they needed to be successful. The desired endstate of these efforts was to decrease Iraq's dependence on foreign produce by helping Iraqis provide for Iraq.

The Ministry of Agriculture, Baghdad University Agricultural College, Baghdad Veterinary College and several agricultural cooperatives received new equipment to teach students and farmers modern farming techniques. They received animals such as cows for teaching proper care and feeding techniques, further building a cooperative relationship in the community.

=== Last patrol ===
In order to meet the President's 1 September 2010 deadline of 50,000 troops in Iraq, preparation for the brigade's redeployment began shortly after the elections. The brigade executed its redeployment in a way that ensured senior US commanders on the ground had additional combat flexibility for as long as possible.

While roughly half of the brigade flew home from Iraq, approximately 2,000 Raiders departed via a tactical road march (TRM) from Victory Base Complex and Camp Taji in mid-August.

Dubbed "The Last Patrol", the soldiers drove 360 vehicles, including 320 Strykers, 360 miles from Baghdad to Kuwait. This mass convoy was led by the Red Platoon of C Troop 2-1 CAV. This exit was similar to how units first entered Iraq more than seven years prior.

The TRM from Baghdad began early on the morning of 15 August with the final element crossing the Kuwaiti border 19 August. Several major media outlets covered the movement extensively. Representatives from several outlets also rode with the brigade's soldiers as they moved south. After almost eight hours of driving, all units stopped at Camp Adder, Iraq to rest and refit and prepare for the final four-hour leg of the road march and the crossing of the brigade into Kuwait.

The brigade designated the operational name of the Iraq-Kuwait border to be "PL Lakewood", symbolic of the brigade's return home and the contributions of its community partners. The Raider Brigade's departure from Iraq reduced the total number of American forces to 52,000, representing the symbolic end of Operation Iraqi Freedom and the beginning of Operation New Dawn on 1 September 2010.

Upon arrival at the final destination in Camp Virginia, Kuwait, soldiers stripped their Strykers and prepared them for the wash-racks. At the site, soldiers and civilian contractors spent approximately 32 hours per vehicle, completely cleaning them both inside and out.

On 21 August 2010, the brigade cased its colors in Kuwait for movement back to Joint Base Lewis-McChord, officially uncasing them on 7 October 2010.

== Operation Enduring Freedom 2012–13 ==
The brigade combat team was formally notified to prepare for a deployment in support of Operation Enduring Freedom on 19 April 2012. The brigade combat team's preparation included a Unified Endeavor Mission Command Exercise with the 3rd Infantry Division at Fort Stewart, Georgia in May 2012; a mission readiness exercise at the National Training Center in June 2012; and a brigade-directed small unit counter-improvised explosive device validation and advanced situation awareness training exercise at Joint Base Lewis-McChord. Following pre-deployment training and soldier readiness processing, the brigade combat team completed its task organization for combat and deployed its equipment and personnel through Manas, Kyrgyzstan to the Regional Command-South Area of Operations, terminating for theater specific training at Kandahar Airfield. It later assumed security force assistance responsibilities from Combined Task Force Arrowhead, 3–2 SBCT, on 24 November 2012.

Including the eight southern Kandahar Districts of Panjwa’i, Dand, Daman, Spin Boldak, Takteh Pol, Registan, Arghistan, and Maruf, the CTF 4–2 area of operations encompassed an area greater than 41,000 km2, approximately the size of Massachusetts and Connecticut combined. In early November, CTF 4–2 arrayed its four maneuver battalions, military intelligence battalion, brigade support battalion, Afghan National Security Forces Assistance Teams – composed of soldiers from 4–2 SBCT; the 56th Infantry Brigade Combat Team, Texas National Guard; and the 29th Infantry Brigade Combat Team, Hawaii National Guard – and numerous other military and Department of State organizations across twenty-one pieces of tactical infrastructure. The brigade attached its cavalry squadron to the 1st Armored Brigade Combat Team, 3rd Infantry Division in Zabul province.

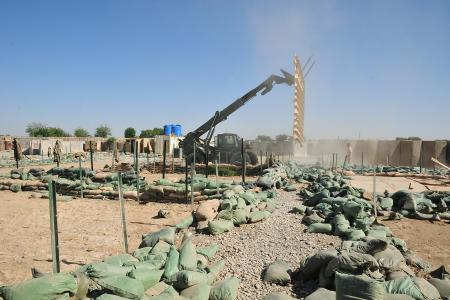
Soldiers of Company B, 4th Battalion, 9th Infantry Regiment load scrap wood onto a forklift 12 May on Combat Outpost Talukan in the Panjwa’i district of Afghanistan. After living on the COP for nearly eight months, the soldiers of B Company demilitarized the COP including tearing down their sleeping tents.

4th Battalion, 9th Infantry Regiment, Task Force Manchu, operated in the western portion of Panjwa’i district, known as the "Horn of Panjwa’i". Their area of operations consisted of Forward Operating Base Zangabad, Combat Outposts Mushan and Talukan, and Checkpoints Mullah Mahdi, Gerandai, and Perozi. Over the span of nine months, the 2nd Kandak, 1st Brigade, 205th Afghan National Army Security Force Assistance Team and Task Force Manchu worked with their partnered kandak daily to enhance the kandak's ability to provide security within the Horn of Panjwa’i. Upon arrival, TF Manchu and its 2nd Kandak SFAT encountered a unit that was completely dependent on International Security Assistance Forces. Eventually, 2nd Kandak – along with 6th Kandak, Afghan National Civil Order Police, Afghan national and local police, successfully completed six independent clearing operations, known as Operations Zafar. In this operation, the units discovered over eighty improvised explosive devices, and destroyed a major home-made explosive factory and numerous caches of smalls arms and other munitions. These operational successes culminated with the successful transfers of COPs Mushan and Talukan, along with Checkpoints Mullah Mahdi, Gerandai, and Perozi to the Afghan National Security Forces.

1st Battalion, 38th Infantry Regiment (TF Rosser) maintained responsibility for the central and eastern portions of Panjwa’i District, approximately 35 kilometers west of Kandahar City. TF Rosser operated out of Forward Operating Base Shoja, and Combat Outposts Sperwan Ghar and Khenjakak. TF Rosser employed two separate security force assistance teams. 6th Kandak, 1st Brigade, 205th Afghan Army SFAT and the District Headquarters-Panjwa’i SFAT provided direct mentorship and assistance to the Afghan National Security Forces in Panjwa’i. Both SFATs worked at the kandak level in a location in southern Afghanistan. TF Rosser and its partnered 6th Kandak conducted a three-week-long combined arms breach, known as Operation Winter Road. The joint Afghan and US task force completed the construction of 6.3 kilometers of road through the heart of Panjwa’i. Seven mine clearing line charges were used to create greater than fifteen sympathetic detonations. Thirty-five trees were removed to provide observation and fields of fire, with over 12,500 lbs of C4 explosive used. Forty-two pressure plate IEDs and one Hybrid RC-IED were reduced from sixteen different locations. TF Rosser exploited six caches consisting of five anti-personnel mines, two grenades, eight RPG rounds, forty-one high metal and thirty-eight carbon rod pressure plate systems, 250 rounds of AK-47 munitions and five AK-47 mags, 600 ft of lamp and detonation cord, ninety-one blasting caps, five radios, one cell phone, and over 350 lbs of HME, as well as hundreds of other IED making materials were removed from the area. During its deployment, the District Headquarters-Panjwa’i SFAT successfully transferred Panjwa’i's District Headquarters to the Afghan Uniformed Police, and the 6th Kandak SFAT at Shoja assisted in hand-over of COPs Khenjakak and Sperwan Ghar to the Afghan National Army.

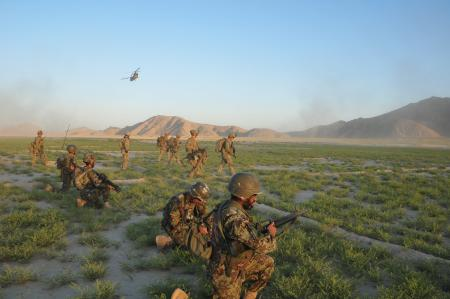
Soldiers of Company C, 1st Battalion, 38th Infantry Regiment and Weapons Company, 6th Kandak, 205th Afghan Army Corps provide perimeter security after exiting a CH-47 Chinook helicopter near the Kheybari Ghar ridgeline in the Panjwa’i District of Afghanistan as part of "Operation Rising Sun III" 4 May. The joint team traversed more than 32 kilometers of terrain while searching 82 Kuchi camps and 12 structures of interest.

The efforts by both TF Manchu and TF Rosser to train and advise the ANSF units led to the improved security situation throughout Panjwa’i District, as the 2nd the 6th Army Kandaks respectively achieved "effective with advisors" and "independent with advisors" by the end of these task forces' deployments in Panjwa’i.

2nd Battalion, 12th Field Artillery Regiment, TF Viking, conducted Security Force Assistance Operations from ten separate bases spread across Kandahar, Zabul, and Farah Provinces. TF Viking executed a diverse mission, advising, training, and assisting the Afghan National Security Forces. Throughout the deployment, TF Viking coordinated parallel and partnered operations with the Daman and Dand Afghan Uniformed Police, along with the Air Force Office of Special Investigation, to interdict enemy lines of communication, prevent the flow of insurgent resources into Panjwa’i District, and interdict enemy indirect fires aimed at Kandahar Airfield, all of which were aided by SFATs' mentorship with the AUP. Together, partnered TF Viking operations reduced significant activities throughout its area of operations by thirty percent since inheriting responsibilities in November. Additionally, partnering from TF Viking and its SFATs with EOD, D-30 field artillery, logistics, and other maneuver support and sustainment training allowed the 4th Afghan Army Combat Service Kandak and the 5th Afghan Army Combat Service Support Kandak to achieve an "independent with advisors" status, resourcefully supporting and sustaining the rest of the 1st Afghan National Army Brigade throughout all of Kandahar province. Also, the Afghan Uniformed Police of Dand and Daman districts achieved the ability to operate completely independent and autonomously from ISAF advisors with the transfer of COP Edgerton and the Daman District Headquarters.

2nd Battalion, 23rd Infantry Regiment (TF Tomahawk) area of operation was Spin Boldak, Takteh Pol, and Shorabak Districts in the south eastern portion of the brigade's area of operations, known as AO Texas. Through the security force assistance teams composed primarily of soldiers from the 56th Infantry Brigade Combat Team, TF Tomahawk partnered with six separate Afghan Security Forces elements to include the 3rd Afghan Border Police Kandak; the 4th Afghan Border Police Kandak; the Takteh Pol and Spin Boldak Afghan Uniform Police; the Afghan Border Police Quick Reaction Force Kandak; and the Afghan Customs Police at the Weesh Border Crossing. TF Tomahawk's conducted numerous partnered operations, known as Operations Southern Fist and Southern Strike, with the Afghan Border Police. During Operations Southern Fist, TF Tomahawk captured two Soviet-designed ZPU anti-aircraft guns with 180 rounds of ammunition, one 82 mm, and one 75 mm recoilless rifle with twenty-two and eighteen rounds of ammunition respectively, one AK-47, three carbines, one pistol, two RPG 7 launchers with fourteen rockets, eight IEDs, 250 kg of homemade explosives and 210 fuses and remote control detonators. TF Tomahawk oversaw Afghan engineers clear numerous routes along the Afghan-Pakistan border, holding the terrain with Afghan resourced checkpoints. TF Tomahawk successfully transferred COP Lakaray and Checkpoint Two to the ANSF, allowed two Afghan Border Police kandaks to achieve complete autonomy from ISAF.

2nd Squadron, 1st Cavalry Regiment, TF BlackHawk, attached to 1st Armored Brigade Combat Team, 3rd Infantry Division, partnered with the 2nd Mobile Strike Force and the 4th Kandak, 2nd Brigade, 205th Afghan Army Corps in Zabul Province at FOB Apache and FOB Wolverine. TF Blackhawk's troopers conducted numerous troop and squadron level training exercises and clearing operations with their Afghan partners. in Operation Blackhawk Hammer, a combined, Afghan-led operation, cleared an area of Zabul Province historically used by the Taliban to stage equipment and caches along Afghan Highway One. The 2nd MSF staged blocking positions to allow the 4th Kandak to clear several Afghan villages of IED components and enemy fighters. Because of this and other operations with TF Blackhawk, 4th Kandak is now conducting independent operations.

702d Brigade Support Battalion deployed to Kandahar Airfield to provide logistical support to operations throughout southern Kandahar Province. The 702d BSB was task organized into six logistic support teams (LST) and three convoy security teams to support CTF 4–2 in Kandahar and 2–1 Cavalry in Zabul province. The LSTs were tailored to support twenty outlying, separate bases and provided distribution of all classes of supply from task force bases to company and platoon COPs. 702d BSB developed a rapid aerial resupply process that maximized the use of all aviation assets available resulting in the successful coordination of roughly 1,000 missions delivering over 1,300 pallets of fresh fruits and vegetables, ammunition, and repair parts to sustain combat operations for four maneuver battalions. The 702d BSB was instrumental in the retrograde and responsible draw down of CTF 4-2's and RC-South's footprint within CTF 4-2's area of operations.

Throughout the nine-month OEF deployment, Raider soldiers neutralized several insurgent cells in key district areas; trained two Afghan National Army kandaks and four district police forces to the point of independent operations; facilitated friendly mobility and infrastructure development deep into traditional enemy sanctuaries, building 12 miles of road and repairing another 20; dramatically reduced requirement for International Security Assistance Force presence in what was a volatile area; enabled the local government to extend services to the population, including four major canal construction projects, three road builds, and six medical civic actions; and ultimately responsibly closed fifteen pieces of tactical infrastructure. Additionally, coupled with the growing legitimacy and influence of Government of the Islamic Republic of Afghanistan officials, the brigade noticed tangible improvements in all of its Afghan National Security Force partners.

On 25 June 2013, 4–2 SBCT received notification that it will be among the twelve brigade combat teams to deactivate over the next five years in support of the Army's effort to downsize the active-duty force as the military winds down from the wars in Iraq and Afghanistan. Following its transfer of authority with the 2nd Stryker Cavalry Regiment, the Raider Brigade formally cased its colors on 11 September 2013 on JBLM. Four days later the city of Lakewood hosted a welcome home parade for the brigade and its family members.

In February 2015 they were informed that they would receive a Meritorious Unit Commendation

== Inactivation ==
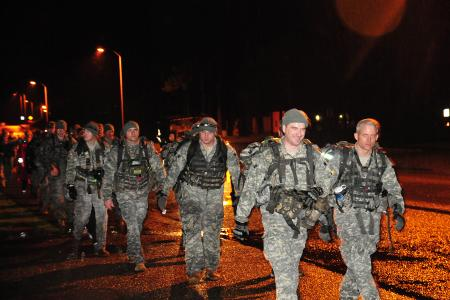
Soldiers with 4–2 Stryker Brigade Combat Team, 7th Infantry Division complete a 25-mile ruck march known as the "Manchu Mile" 6 March on Joint Base Lewis-McChord

4-2 SBCT requested that its inactivation effective-date be delayed by ninety days in order for the brigade to certify its soldiers in individual and crew-served weapons proficiency. Ultimately on 26 January 2014, FORSCOM denied the brigade's e-date extension and the brigade was required to transfer the flags, equipment, and lineage of 4-9 IN, 1-38 IN, 2-23 IN, 2-1 CAV, and 2-12 FA to Fort Carson as part of the Herculean task of supporting 1/4 Armored Brigade Combat Team's conversion from an ABCT to a SBCT. Per 7th ID's directive, the brigade turned-in over 75,000 pieces of excess equipment and laterally transferred over 3,000 pieces to other JBLM units. Project Manager Stryker received all of the brigade's Strykers and 1/4 ABCT received over 16,000 pieces, to include 4-2 SBCT's M777 towed howitzers.

The first two weeks of March 2014 were scheduled for the units' crucible and legacy events that honored the history and lineage of the units, and challenged soldiers' knowledge of individual skills. Such events included the Manchu Mile, Rock Fitness Challenge, Tomahawk 23 km Squad Competition, Spur Ride, Viking Frenzy, and Iron Hammer. The brigade officially deactivated on 14 March 2014 in Soldiers Field House.

== Command teams ==
- Col. Jon Lehr/CSM John Wayne Troxell, 1 June 2006 – 8 August 2008
- Col. John Norris/CSM Jeffrey Huggins, 8 August 2008 – 30 November 2010
- Col. Michael A. Getchell/CSM Paul D. Balmforth, 30 November 2010 – 4 June 2012
- Col. Michael A. Getchell/CSM Oscar L. Vinson, 4 June 2012 – 16 October 2013
- Col. Jody C. Miller/CSM Oscar L. Vinson, 16 October 2013 – 14 March 2014
