= 52nd Infantry Regiment (United States) =

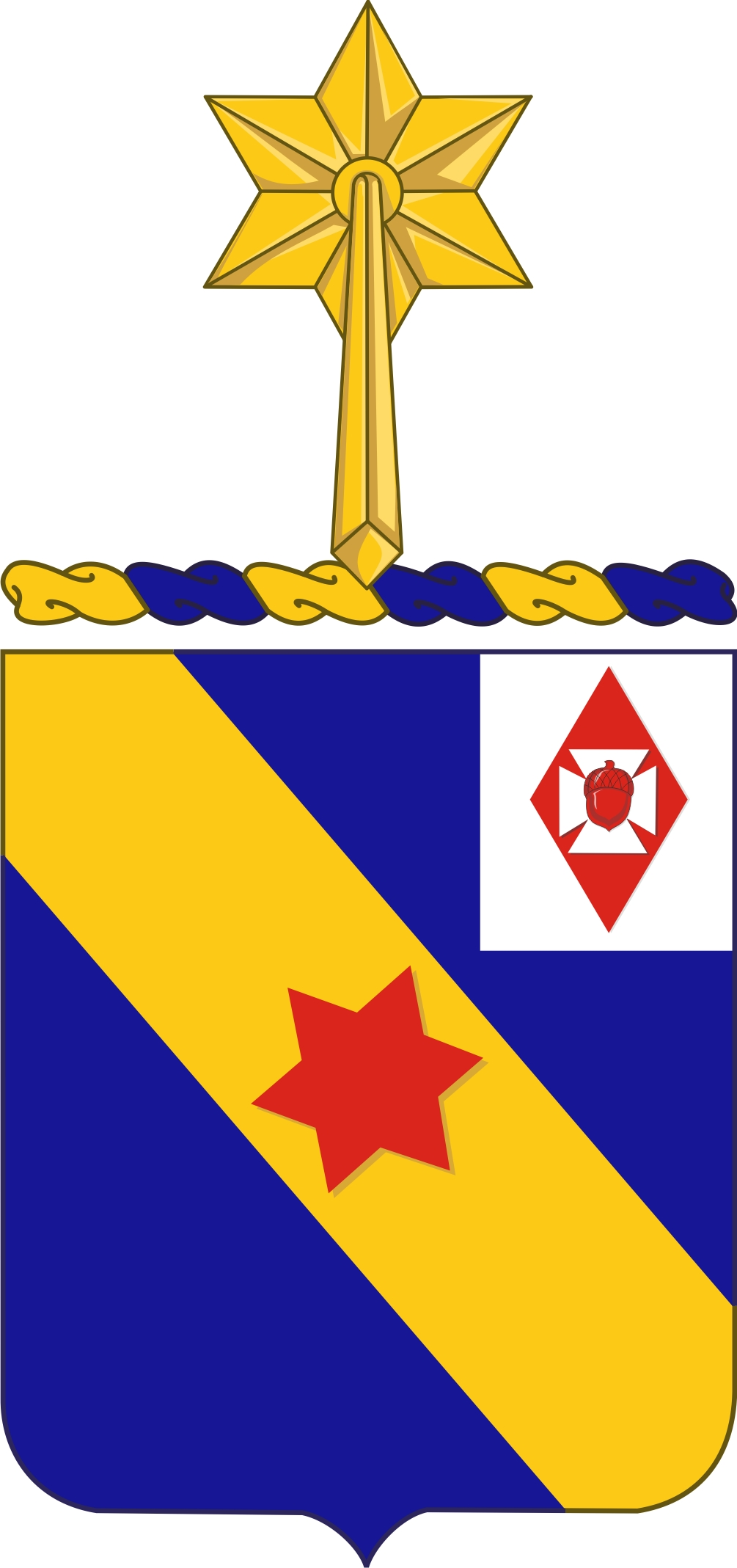
- Coat of arms
- Active: 1917-2016
- Country: United States
- Branch: United States Army
- Type: Infantry
- Nickname: "Ready Rifles" (special designation)
- Mottos: "Fortis et Certus" (Brave and True)
- Infantry colors: Blue and white
- Engagements: World War I World War II; Vietnam War; Iraq Campaign; Afghanistan

Insignia
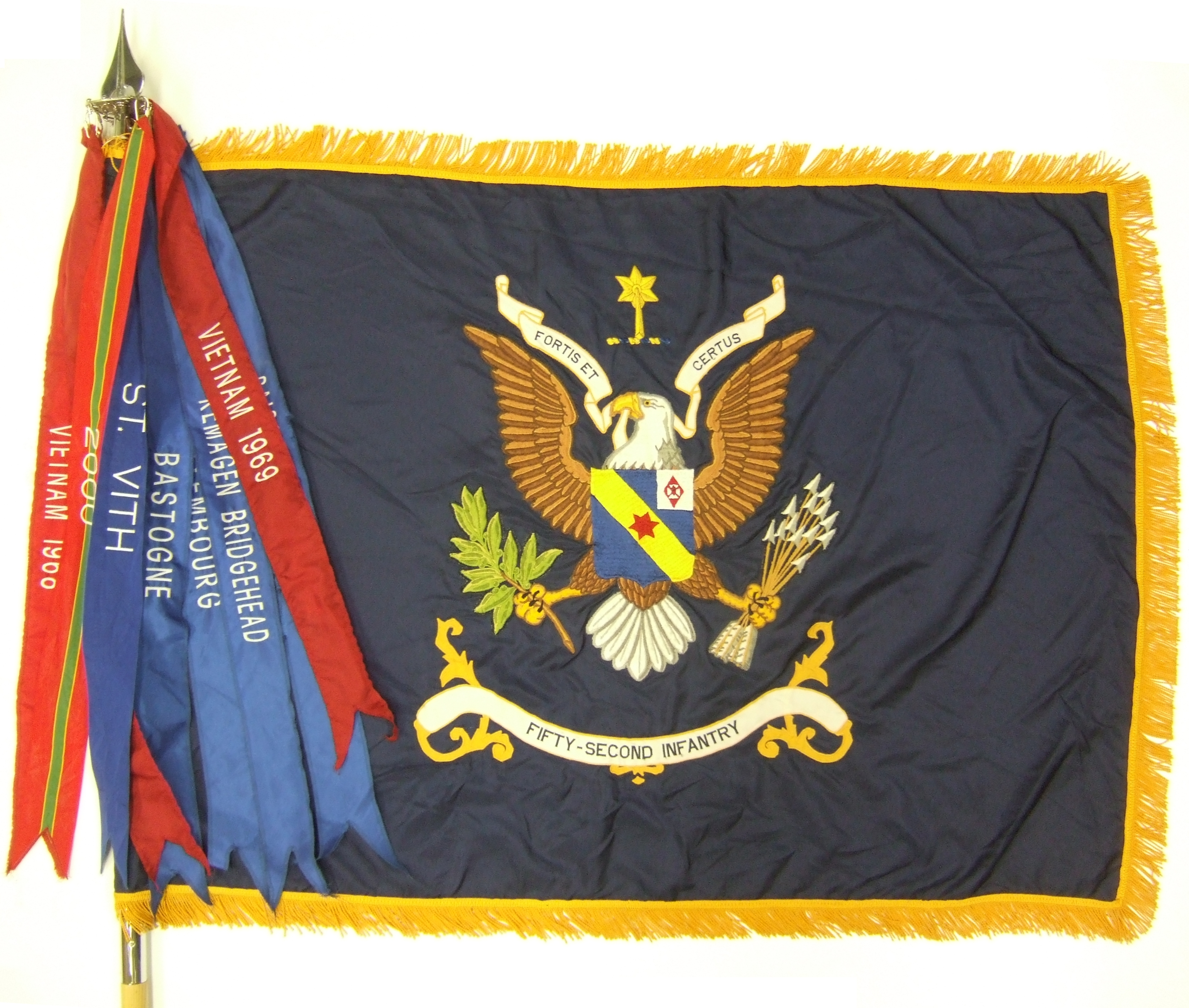
- Colors

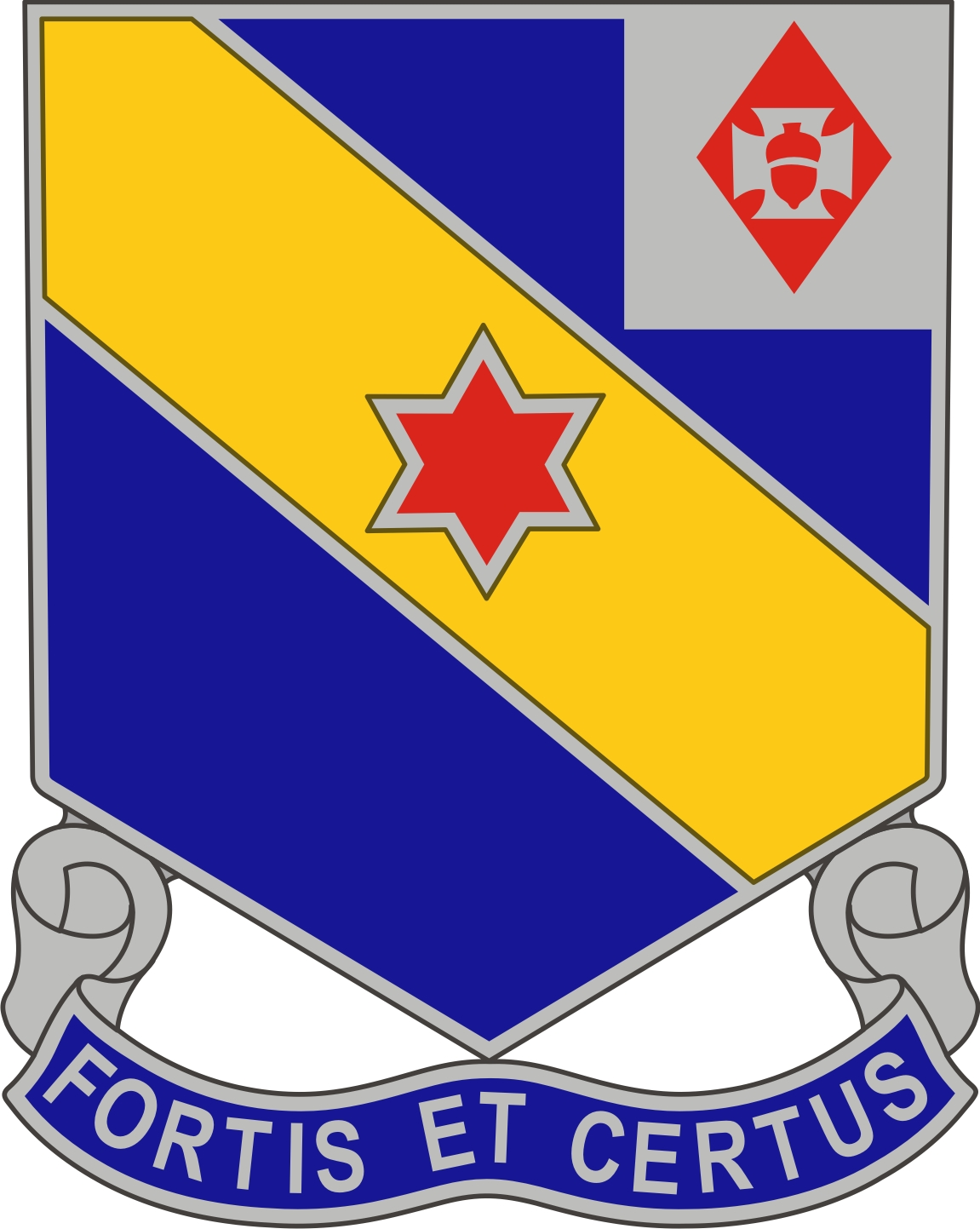
- Distinctive unit insignia

The 52nd Infantry Regiment ("Ready Rifles") is an infantry regiment of the United States Army.

The charges on the canton of the regiment's coat of arms represent the 11th Infantry from which this regiment was formed in 1917. Its first combat service was in World War I in the Gerardmer Sector in Alsace, a short distance west of Colmar. The bend from the arms of Alsace has been charged with the 6th Division shoulder sleeve insignia to show that the regiment was with that division in France.

The coat of arms was originally approved for the 52d Infantry Regiment on 29 June 1921. It was redesignated for the 52d Armored Infantry Regiment on 29 September 1942. The insignia was redesignated for the 52d Armored Infantry Battalion on 6 January 1944. It was redesignated for the 52d Infantry Regiment on 31 October 1958.

== History ==
The regiment was first activated 16 June 1917, at Chickamauga, Georgia. The unit first saw combat in Meuse-Argonne, in Northern France, and in Alsace, France, during World War I.

== World War I ==
After the 52nd Infantry Regiment's activation in 1917, the regiment was assigned to the Sixth Infantry Division. The Sixth Division was organized in November 1917 as a square division consisting of the 51st, 52nd, 53rd, and the 54th Infantry Regiments, the 16th, 17th and 18th Machine-Gun Battalions and the 3rd, 11th and 78th Field Artillery Regiments. The units of the division gathered in New York and left for France in July 1918. After marching and training all over western France, the Sixth was assigned on 31 August to the Vosges sector. There, a chain of lofty wooded peaks had stalemated both the French and German armies. Their mission was the defense of a 21-mile front. The division engaged in active patrols in no man's land and behind the German lines. In addition, infantry platoon strongpoints defended against German raiding parties which launched their attacks using liquid fire and grenades.

6th Infantry Division shoulder sleeve insignia

The division developed its reputation for hiking and nickname of "The Sightseeing Sixth" when, prior to the Argonne offensive, it engaged in extensive fake marches, often under enemy artillery and air bombardment, to deceive the Germans into thinking a major attack was to take place in the Vosges sector. After another short period of training, consisting primarily of forced marches, the division hiked itself into the closing campaign of the war, the Meuse-Argonne offensive. In corps reserve, the 6th was used in place of an unavailable cavalry division to try to maintain contact with the rapidly retreating Germans. During its three months at the front, the 6th Division lost 227 men killed in action or died of wounds. It maintained an active defense in one important sector and played a major role in the tactical plan in another.

After the armistice, the six-pointed red star was adopted as the division insignia on 19 November 1918. The star subsequently became a part of the 52nd Infantry's crest, to mark the regiment's first combat with the 6th Division.

== Interwar period ==
The 52nd Infantry Regiment arrived at the port of New York on 12 June 1919 on the troopship USS Leviathan and was transferred on 19 June 1919 to Camp Grant, Illinois. It was inactivated on 1 September 1921 and allotted to the Sixth Corps Area for mobilization responsibility; the 54th Infantry Regiment was previously designated as "Active Associate," from which the personnel would come to reactivate the regiment in the event of war. The personnel of the 52nd Infantry were concurrently transferred to the 54th Infantry. The 54th Infantry was relieved as Active Associate on 17 July 1922 and the 6th Infantry Regiment was designated as Active Associate. With the abandonment of the Active Associate concept, the 52nd Infantry was organized 9 April 1926 with Organized Reserve personnel as a "Regular Army Inactive" (RAI) unit with headquarters at Urbana, Illinois, with the 6th Infantry being relieved as Active Associate on 28 February 1927. The regiment was relieved from the 6th Division on 15 August 1927 and assigned to the 9th Division.

The 52nd Infantry, less the 3rd Battalion, was affiliated with the University of Illinois Reserve Officers' Training Corps (ROTC) program and organized on 15 April 1929 as an RAI unit with Regular Army personnel assigned to the ROTC detachment and Reserve officers commissioned from the program. Concurrently, the 3rd Battalion was affiliated with Northwestern University ROTC at Evanston, Illinois. The regiment was attached to the 86th Division for administrative purposes on 3 November 1930. It was relocated 26 February 1932 to Champaign, Illinois. It was relieved from the 9th Division on 1 October 1933 and reassigned to the 6th Division. The regiment was relieved from the 6th Division on 12 October 1939. It typically conducted inactive training period meetings at the 202nd Coast Artillery armory or at the Army and Navy Club in Chicago. Also conducted semiannual contact camps with the 12th Infantry Regiment at Fort Sheridan, Illinois, in the 1930s. Conducted summer training at Jefferson Barracks, Missouri, and Fort Sheridan. As an alternate form of summer training, it also conducted infantry Citizens Military Training Camps some years at Jefferson Barracks, Fort Sheridan, and Camp Custer, Michigan. The designated mobilization training station for the regiment was Jefferson Barracks.

== World War II ==
U.S. Army personnel cross the Ludendorff Bridge

The 52nd Infantry Regiment was reactivated as the 52nd Armored Infantry Regiment on 15 July 1942 as an element of the 9th Armored Division at Fort Riley, Kansas. They would deploy with the 9th Armored Division to France, Luxembourg, Belgium, and Germany after a two-month train up in England. The company served in Europe with the 9th Armored Division from 31 July 1944 to 6 May 1945, including a weeklong attachment to the 8th Infantry Division from 23 October 1944 to 30 October 1944.

The 9th Armored Division was one of several real US Army divisions that participated in Operation Fortitude, the deception operation mounted by the US-British to deceive the Germans about the real landing site for Operation Neptune, the amphibious invasion of Northern France. The 9th was assigned to a camp on the British coastline opposite of the German defenses in Pas-de-Calais, ostensibly as part of the "First US Army Group" (FUSAG) under General Patton. While its members undertook training for the real invasion of the Normandy coast, the divisional headquarters was used to convey phony radio messages with the fake FUSAG HQ to make the Germans believe that an invasion of Pas-de-Calais by a massive army was the real intent of the Allies. The ruse was so successful that the German high command was completely fooled and concentrated their reserves away from the Normandy coast. In honor of their participation in this deception, the 9th was officially nicknamed the "Phantom Division." The 9th Armored Division landed in Normandy late in September 1944, and first went into line, 23 October, on patrol duty in a quiet sector along the Luxembourg-German frontier. When the Germans launched their winter offensive, the 9th, with no real combat experience, suddenly found itself engaged in heavy fighting. The division saw its severest action at St. Vith, Echternach, and Bastogne, its units fighting in widely separated areas.

Its stand at Bastogne held off the Germans long enough to enable the 101st Airborne to dig in for a defense of the city. After a rest period in January 1945, the division made preparations for a drive across the Rur river. The offensive was launched, 28 February, and the 9th smashed across the Rur to Rheinbach, sending patrols into Remagen. The Ludendorff Bridge at Remagen was found intact and was seized by elements of the 9th Armored minutes before demolition charges were set to explode on 7 March 1945. The division exploited the bridgehead, moving south and east across the river Lahn toward Limburg an der Lahn, where thousands of Allied prisoners were liberated. The 52d Armored Infantry Battalion held back an advancing Nazi armor and infantry force while the 101st Airborne set up defenses in Bastogne, resulting in successful retention of the city. Soldiers of C Company, 52d Armored Infantry Battalion rescued four American tanks caught in a Nazi complex attack.

Following operations at the Remagen bridgehead, the division drove on to Frankfurt and then turned to assist in the closing of the Ruhr Pocket. In April it continued east, encircled Leipzig and secured a line along the Mulde river. The division was shifting south to Czechoslovakia when the war in Europe ended.

== Vietnam ==
During the Vietnam War, the 52nd Infantry participated in multiple counter offenses, earning one Presidential Unit Citation and three Meritorious Unit Commendations for operations in Saigon and other areas of Vietnam.

Arrival Date	Base Camp	Forward Location	Major Command	Notes
1st Battalion, 52nd Infantry Arrived in Vietnam in October 1967 on board the USS Gordon Troop Carrier at DaNang.
February 1968	Chu Lai	Chu Lai	198th Light Infantry Brigade	Light Infantry Role
November 1968	Tam Ky	Tam Ky		
December 1968	Chu Lai	Chu Lai		
February 1969	Chu Lai	Chu Lai	23rd Infantry Division (United States)	Light Infantry Role
December 1969		Dong Le		
April 1970		Long Phu		
August 1970		Trung Canh		
September 1970		My Son		
November 1970		Tri Binh		
December 1970		Chu Lai		
August 1971		The Loi	11th Infantry Brigade	Light Infantry Role
Battalion DEROS at end of October 1971
Company C, 52nd Infantry Regiment Arrived in Vietnam on 1 December 1966
	Saigon	Saigon	716th Military Police Battalion	Unit had Rifle Security role supporting the Military Police
Company C, 52nd Infantry Regiment DEROS 15 August 1972
Company D, 52nd Infantry Regiment Arrived in Vietnam on 26 November 1966
26 November 1966	Long Binh	Long Binh	95th Military Police Battalion	Unit had rifle security role supporting the military police
Company D, 52nd Infantry Regiment DEROS 22 November 1969
Company D, 52nd Infantry Regiment Returned to Vietnam on 30 June 1971
26 November 1966	Qui Nhon	Qui Nhon	US Army Support Command, Qui Nhon	Unit staffed the Security Facilities of Qui Nhon Depot the Port of Qui Nhon, and the Qui Nhon Army Airfield.
Company D, 52nd Infantry Regiment DEROS 26 November 1972
Company E, 52nd Infantry Regiment Activated in Vietnam on 20 December 1967
20 December 1967	An Khe	Roving	1st Cavalry Division	Unit operated as a separate long range reconnaissance patrol company.
Company E, 52nd Infantry Regiment Inactivated in Vietnam on 1 February 1969
Company F, 52nd Infantry Regiment Activated in Vietnam on 20 December 1967
20 December 1967	Various	Various	1st Infantry Division.	Unit operated as a separate long range reconnaissance patrol company.
Company F, 52nd Infantry Regiment Inactivated in Vietnam on 1 February 1969

=== C Company, 52nd Infantry in Vietnam ===
C Company, 52nd Infantry served in Vietnam from 1 December 1966 to 15 August 1972. In 1971, the company had an authorized strength of 137 infantrymen. Three years earlier in 1968, C Company, 52nd Infantry had an authorized strength of 151 infantrymen. The company was a rifle security company assigned to bolster the infantry capabilities of the 716th Military Police Battalion (89th Military Police Group, 18th Military Police Brigade), which was responsible for providing security to the US facilities in the Saigon area. The status of forces agreement between the US and the South Vietnamese government prohibited stationing US combat forces in Saigon. As a result, the only forces within Saigon, C Company, 52nd Infantry, with the 716th Military Police Battalion, the 527th Military Police Company, and the 90th Military Police Detachment, were equipped only with hand-held light arms.

They were on alert and expected isolated terrorist attacks. However, they would soon face the Tet offensive, an all-out communist attack throughout the whole of Vietnam. The North Vietnamese violated the Tet holiday cease-fire in order to gain surprise against U.S. and South Vietnamese forces. Although U.S. intelligence anticipated the cease-fire would be violated, no one expected an all-out attack within the city of Saigon. Instead, they would face some 4000 Viet Cong guerillas, many of whom had infiltrated Saigon during holiday festivities and were nearly indistinguishable from the local populace. In the early morning hours of 31 January 1968, these forces attacked facilities throughout Saigon almost simultaneously. C Company, 52d Infantry, along with the 716th MP and attached forces, would find themselves defending the US Embassy, Saigon against not only superior numbers but superior armament as well.

The security policemen on the perimeter could hear muffled gunfire as the VC shot up some of the bachelor officers' quarters and bachelor enlisted quarters along Plantation Road, which ran south through Cholon from the main gate of Tan Son Nhut. Five troops were killed, including a young, enlisted man passing through on a Honda motorcycle on his way to his duty station. An MP jeep patrol was pinned down upon responding to the attack. The reaction team that arrived to reinforce the situation was headed by Staff Sergeant Jimmy Bedgood of C Company, 52d Infantry, a security-guard company made up of combat infantry veterans that was attached to the 716th Military Police Battalion. The reaction team provided the cover fire that allowed the jeep patrol to get out of harm's way. In the process, an RPG slammed into the reaction team's jeep, wounding several GIs and killing Bedgood. An article in a Military Police publication described the actions of SSG Herman Holness that day:

As both military police and marine reaction forces responded to the embassy, a stalemate ensued. Military police surrounded the compound and exchanged fire with the guerillas on the grounds but could not enter the compound due to the volume of fire and uncertainty as to the enemy's disposition. The Viet Cong could not enter the embassy building and could not exit the compound. Additionally, an infantry reaction force that attempted to land by helicopter on the roof of the embassy was repulsed by enemy fire. At dawn, the order was given to retake the compound. Military police rammed the embassy's main gate and stormed the compound led by PFC Paul Healy of B Company, 716th Military Police Battalion. When the embassy was resecured, 19 dead Viet Cong were found, and one was captured.

Despite being outnumbered and outgunned, none of the facilities in the charge of C-52d Infantry and the 716th MP Battalion were captured during the VC assault. The company's performance during Tet was recognized by the Presidential Unit Citation, but the award came at a high price. Along with 27 soldiers of the 716th MP, nine C-52d soldiers gave their lives during the first day's fighting in Saigon:

- 2LT Stephen L. Braddock, Abilene, TX
- SSG Rafael A. Ruiz-del Pilar, Quebradillas, PR
- SSG Jimmy Bedgood, Milledgeville, GA
- SGT Robert B. Stafford, Kingsport, TN
- SP4 Frank E. Faught, Coweta, OK
- SP4 Troy E. Hirni, Warrensburg, MO (Bronze Star "V")
- CPL Randall K. Schutt, Sioux Center, IA
- CPL James E. Walsh, Dayton, OH
- PFC Lester G. Yarbrough, Kingsland, GA

For their actions in Saigon and in defense of the U.S. Embassy, four soldiers of C-52d IN received the military's third highest award, the Silver Star: SFC James R. Lobato, SSG Herman Holness, SPC Bruce McCartney, and SPC Vincent R. Giovanelli. A 20-year-old native of Perryopolis, Pennsylvania, SPC Giovanelli also was awarded "the Combat Infantryman Badge, Purple Heart, and Bronze Star Medal for heroism." The "presentation [of his Silver Star] was made 12 April [1968] near Saigon by Gen. Creighton W. Abrams, [then] deputy commanding general, U.S. Military Assistance Command, Vietnam."

The 2nd Battalion, 52nd Infantry was deployed to help suppress the April 1968 Chicago riots.

== After Vietnam ==
In 1988, 1st Battalion, 52nd Infantry became a part of the Opposition Force 177th Armored Brigade at the National Training Center at Fort Irwin, California, as the 6th Battalion, 31st Infantry reflagged into 1-52 Infantry. It carried out this role for six years. On 26 October 1994, 1st Battalion, 52nd Infantry was inactivated, and 2nd Squadron, 11th Armored Cavalry Regiment was reactivated in its place by reflagging the unit as part of the movement of the 11th Armored Cavalry Regiment to Fort Irwin to become the Opposition Force at the National Training Center.

== 21st century ==
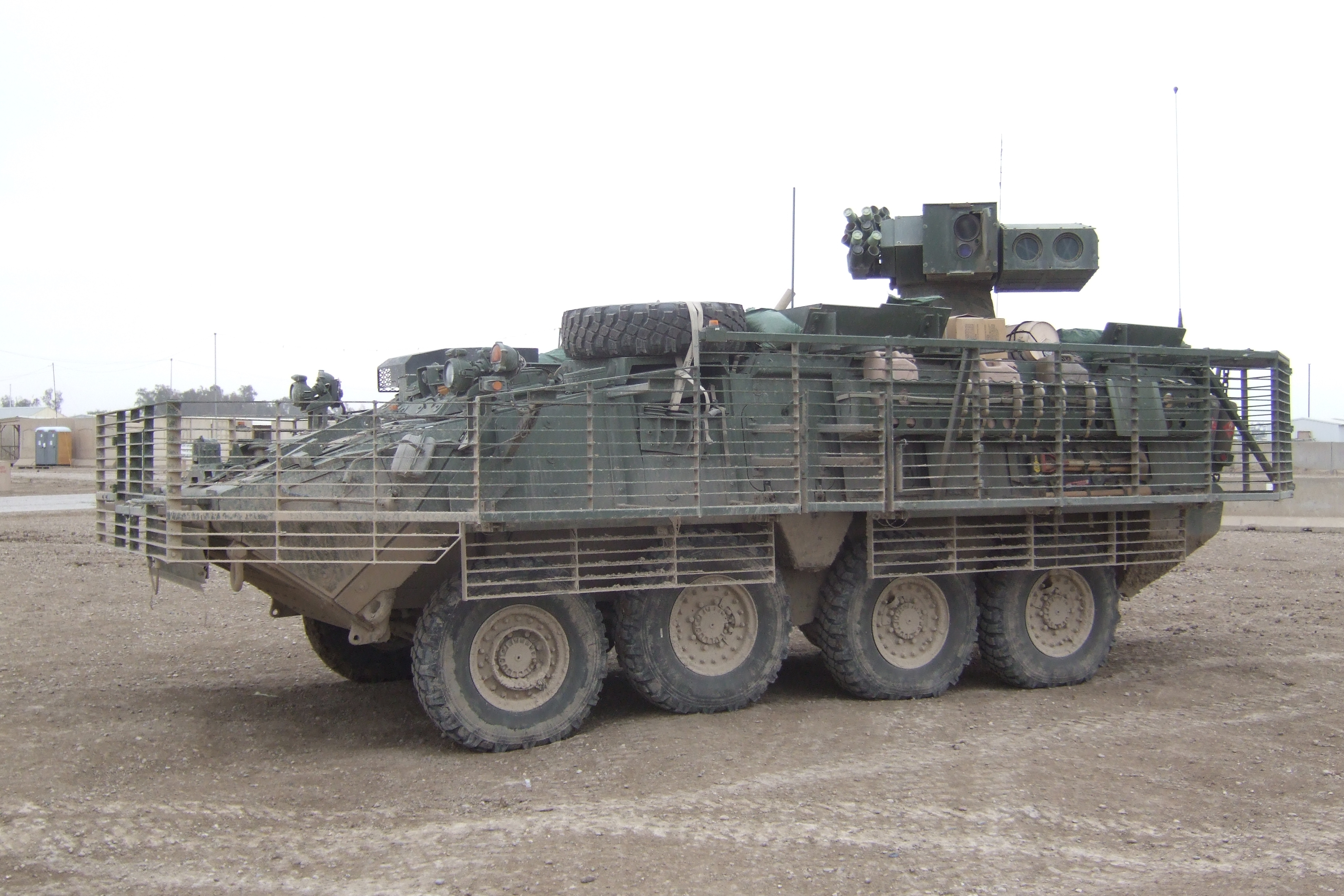
M1134 Stryker ATGM

In May 2000, the Army stood up its first Stryker Brigade Combat Team (3rd Brigade Combat Team, 2nd Infantry Division, stationed at Fort Lewis, WA) under former Army Chief of Staff Eric Shinseki's Stryker Interim-Force Brigade Combat Team initiative. In September 2000, A-D Companies of 1st Battalion, 32nd Armor Regiment were reflagged as 1st Squadron, 14th Cavalry Regiment (RSTA) while Company E, 1–32 AR was reflagged as Company C, 52d Infantry Regiment. The company is commonly referred to as C-52, "Charlie Five Two", and is nicknamed "Avalanche". As the Army stood up a total of six Stryker brigades by 2008, each anti-tank company was flagged as a separate company of the 52nd Infantry Regiment. The commander of Company C, 52nd Infantry Regiment, as the first company reactivated under the 52nd Infantry, holds the regimental colors and is the regimental commander.

From September 2000, C-52nd IN has served as the anti-tank company in support of 3d Brigade, 2d Infantry Division. The company holds a strength of 53 soldiers and 11 Stryker vehicles and has been most notably utilized to provide anti-tank support to the brigade's three Infantry battalions (1–23 IN, 2–3 IN, 5–20 IN) and other task forces operating in or near the brigade's area of operations.

Company C, 52nd Infantry deployed twice in support of Operation Iraqi Freedom, initially helping to facilitate the first democratic election in the country's history and secondly serving as a reserve element for the 3d BCT, 2d Infantry Division.

Company D, 52 Infantry deployed in support of Operation Iraqi Freedom in a 12-month deployment between October 2004 and October 2005 as part of 1st Brigade 25th Infantry Division (Stryker Brigade Combat Team) Delta Company was tasked attachment to 2nd Battalion 8th Field Artillery (Automatic) Forward Operating Base Endurance (Q-West) for the primary task of over overwatch, response and flash TCP (traffic control points) over MSR (Main Supply Route) Tampa. Platoons maintained rotations from an outpost in the village of Ash Sharuh, maintaining a presence throughout the region of Qayyarah.

Company D, 52nd Infantry deployed in support of Operation Enduring Freedom, serving both as a stand-alone, battle space owning company, and as a support element for 1st battalion, 5th Infantry Regiment.

Even more recent, Company F, 52nd Infantry deployed also in support of Operation Enduring Freedom, serving both as a stand-alone, battle space owning company, and as a support element for 1st Battalion, 38th Infantry Regiment, 4th Battalion, 9th Infantry Regiment and 4th Brigade, 2nd Infantry Division in Panjwai, Kandahar Afghanistan.

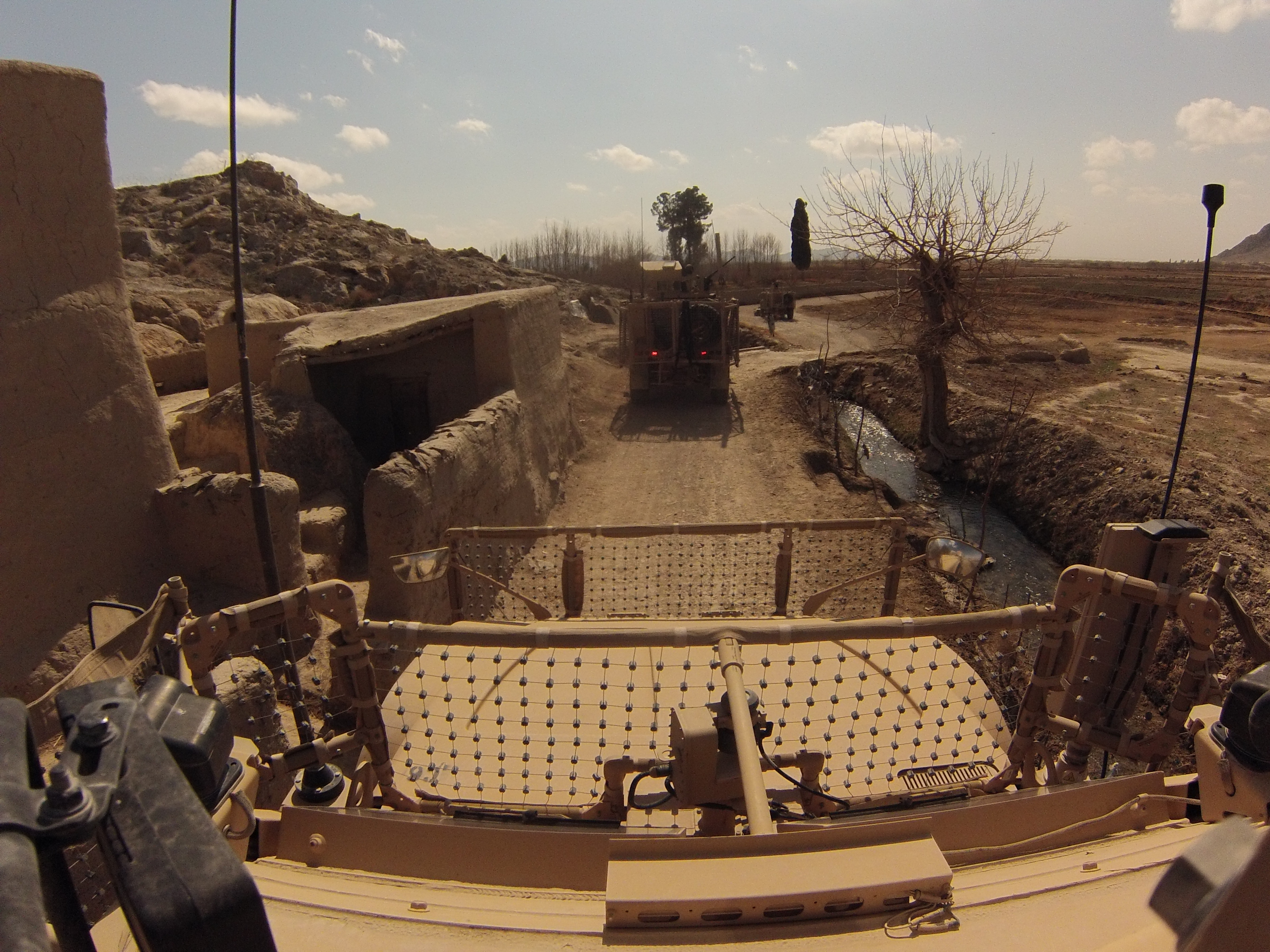
F Company, 52nd Infantry conducts a mounted patrol through Nejat, Panjwai, Afghanistan

Stryker brigade	Company	Nickname	Deployments
3d BCT, 2d Infantry Division	Co C, 52d IN	Hellcat (formerly Avalanche)	3 – 4 November; 6 July – 7 September; 9 – 10 August
2d Cavalry Regiment	Co K, 52d IN	Killer	4 – 5 November; 7 August – 8 November
1st SBCT, 25th Infantry Division (Styker Brigade Combat Team)	Co D, 52d IN	Hellcat	13 October 2004 - 01 October 2005 OIF; 5 September – 6 December; 8 – 9 September; 11–12 April
4th BCT, 2d Infantry Division	Co F, 52d IN	Fierce	7 March – 8 June; 9 – 10 September
2d BCT, 25th Infantry Division	Co B, 52d IN	Hammer	7 – 8 December
2d BCT, 2nd Infantry Division	Co A, 52d IN	Dog (formerly Spartan)	9 – 10 July

== Lineage ==
- Constituted 15 May 1917 in the Regular Army as the 52nd Infantry Regiment.
- Organized 16 June 1917 at Chickamauga Park, Georgia.
- Assigned 16 November 1917 to the 6th Division.
- Inactivated 1 September 1921 at Camp Grant, Illinois.
- Relieved 15 August 1927 from assignment to the 6th Division and assigned to the 9th Division.
- Relieved 1 October 1933 from assignment to the 9th Division and assigned to the 6th Division.
- Relieved 1 October 1940 from assignment to the 6th Division.
- Redesignated 15 July 1942 as the 52nd Armored Infantry, assigned to the 9th Armored Division, and activated at Fort Riley, Kansas.
- Regiment broken up 9 October 1943 at Camp Young and its elements reorganized and redesignated as elements of the 9th Armored Division as follows:
1. HHC, 52nd Armored Infantry Regiment (less 1st, 2d, and 3d Battalions) as the 52nd Armored Infantry Battalion.
2. 1st Battalion as the 60th Armored Infantry Battalion.
3. 2nd Battalion as the 27th Armored Infantry Battalion.
4. 3rd Battalion disbanded, with the assets and personnel being assumed by the 52nd Armored Infantry Battalion.
- Battalions inactivated 13 October 1945 at Camp Patrick Henry, Virginia.
- Battalions Relieved 14 September 1950 from assignment to the 9th Armored Division; concurrently consolidated to form the 52nd Infantry Regiment and assigned to the 71st Infantry Division.
- Relieved 25 February 1953 from assignment to the 71st Infantry Division; regiment concurrently broken up and its elements redesignated as elements of the 9th Armored Division as follows:
1. HHC, 52d Infantry Regiment (less 1st, 2d, and 3d Battalions) as the 52d Armored Infantry Battalion.
2. 1st Battalion as the 560th Armored Infantry Battalion.
3. 2d Battalion as the 527th Armored Infantry Battalion.
4. Former 3d Battalion reconstituted as the 528th Armored Infantry Battalion.
- 52d Armored Infantry Battalion relieved 23 July 1956 from assignment to the 9th Armored Division;
- 52d Armored Infantry Battalion activated 15 August 1956 in Italy.
- 560th, 527th, and 528th Armored Infantry Battalions relieved 1 March 1957 from assignment to the 9th Armored Division.
- 52d Armored Infantry Battalion inactivated 24 June 1958 in Italy.
- On 1 July 1959, the following actions took place:
1. 52d, 560th, 527th, and 528th Armored Infantry Battalions consolidated to form the 52d Infantry, a parent regiment under the Combat Arms Regimental System.
2. 560th Armored Infantry Battalion redesignated as Headquarters and Headquarters Company, 3d Battle Group, 52nd Infantry.
3. 527th Infantry Battalion redesignated as Headquarters and Headquarters Company, 4th Battle Group, 52d Infantry.
- 1st Battle Group Reorganized and redesignated 3 February 1962 as the 1st Battalion, 52d Infantry, and assigned to the 1st Armored Division.
- On 23 March 1966, the following actions took place:
1. 3d Battle Group, 52d Infantry redesignated as Company C, 52d Infantry.
2. 4th Battle Group, 52nd Infantry redesignated as Company D, 52d Infantry.
- On 1 June 1966, the following actions took place:
1. Company C, 52d Infantry activated at Fort Lewis, Washington.
2. Company D, 52d Infantry activated at Fort Lewis, Washington.
- Company D, 52d Infantry arrived in Vietnam on 26 November 1966.
- Company C, 52 cd Infantry arrived in Vietnam on 1 December 1966.
- 1st Battalion relieved 12 May 1967 from assignment to the 1st Armored Division and assigned to the 198th Infantry Brigade.
- On 20 December 1967, the following actions took place:
1. Headquarters and Headquarters Company, 6th Battle Group, 52d Infantry redesignated as Company F, 52d Infantry, and activated in Vietnam.
2. Company E, 52d Infantry arrived in Vietnam.
- 1st Battalion, 52d Infantry arrived in Vietnam on 10 February 1968.
- On 1 February 1969, the following actions took place:
1. Company E, 52d Infantry inactivated in Vietnam.
2. Company F, 52d Infantry inactivated in Vietnam.
- 1st Battalion relieved 15 February 1969 from assignment to the 198th Infantry Brigade and assigned to the 23d Infantry Division in Vietnam.
- Company D, 52d Infantry inactivated 22 November 1969 in Vietnam.
- Company D, 52d Infantry activated 30 June 1971 in Vietnam.
- 1st Battalion, 52d Infantry returned from Vietnam on 1 November 1971.
- 1st Battalion relieved 30 November 1971 from assignment to the 23d Infantry Division.
- Company C, 52d Infantry inactivated 15 August 1972 in Vietnam.
- 1st Battalion assigned 15 September 1972 to the 1st Armored Division
- Company D, 52d Infantry inactivated 26 November 1972.
- 1st Battalion inactivated 16 November 1987 in Germany and relieved from assignment to the 1st Armored Division.
- On 16 January 1988 the following actions took place:
1. Regiment withdrawn from the Combat Arms Regimental System and reorganized under the United States Army Regimental System.
2. 1st Battalion activated at Fort Irwin, California.
- 1st Battalion assigned 16 October 1991 to the 177th Armored Brigade
- 1st Battalion inactivated 15 October 1994 at Fort Irwin, California, and relieved from assignment to the 177th Armored Brigade
- Company F, 52d Infantry activated 16 June 1996 at Fort Lewis, Washington.
- Company C, 52d Infantry assigned 16 September 2000 to the 2d Infantry Division and activated at Fort Lewis, Washington.
- Headquarters and Headquarters Company, 1st Battalion, 52d Infantry redesignated 19 December 2001 as Company A, 52nd Infantry.
- Company D, 52d Infantry assigned 16 July 2002 to the 25th Infantry Division and activated at Fort Lewis, Washington.
- Company A, 52d Infantry assigned 16 January 2004 to the 172nd Infantry Brigade and activated at Fort Wainwright, Alaska
- On 1 October 2005, the following actions took place:
1. Regiment redesignated as the 52nd Infantry Regiment.
2. Company A, 52d Infantry redesignated Company A, 52nd Infantry Regiment.
- On 1 June 2006, the following actions took place:
1. Company D, 52d Infantry inactivated at Fort Lewis, Washington, and relieved from assignment to the 25th Infantry Division.
2. Company F, 52d Infantry Regiment assigned to the 4th Brigade Combat Team, 2d Infantry Division, and activated at Fort Lewis, Washington.
- On 16 December 2006 the following actions took place:
1. Company A, 52d Infantry Regiment inactivated at Fort Wainwright, Alaska, and relieved from assignment to the 172d Infantry Brigade Combat Team.
2. Company D, 52d Infantry Regiment assigned to the 1st Brigade Combat Team, 25th Infantry Division, and activated at Fort Wainwright, Alaska.
- Company A, 52d Infantry Regiment assigned 17 April 2007 to the 5th Brigade Combat Team, 2d Infantry Division, and activated at Fort Lewis, Washington.
- Company C (LRS), 52d Infantry Regiment activated 29 May 2015 at Joint Base Lewis-McChord with personnel and equipment from Troop C (LRS), 3d Squadron, 38th Cavalry Regiment (separate lineage).
- Company C (LRS), 52d Infantry Regiment inactivated in a ceremony held on 15 December 2016.

== Honors ==
Campaign participation credit

- World War I: Meuse-Argonne; Alsace 1918
- World War II – EAME: Rhineland; Ardennes-Alsace; Central Europe
- Vietnam: Counteroffensive, Phase II; Counteroffensive, Phase III; Tet Counteroffensive; Counteroffensive, Phase IV; Counteroffensive, *Phase V; Counteroffensive, Phase VI; Tet 69/Counteroffensive; Summer-Fall 1969; Winter-Spring 1970; Sanctuary Counteroffensive; *Counteroffensive, Phase VII; Consolidation I; Consolidation II; Cease-Fire
- War on terrorism: Campaigns to be determined

Decorations

Presidential Unit Citation (Army) for: LUXEMBOURG, ST. VITH, BASTOGNE, REMAGEN BRIDGEHEAD, SAIGON - TET OFFENSIVE

- Meritorious Unit Commendation (Army) for: VIETNAM 1967, VIETNAM 1968, VIETNAM 1968-1969

Army Superior Unit Award for 1988, 1991, 2000

- Belgian Croix de Guerre 1940 with Palm for BASTOGNE; cited in the Order of the Day of the Belgian Army for action at Bastogne.

== History ==
=== World War II service ===
In World War II, the 52nd Infantry, as the 60th Armored Infantry, battled the Germans in central Europe. For actions in Luxembourg, Bastogne, and the Remagen Bridgehead in Germany, the unit was awarded three Presidential Unit Citations.

Date	Event	Location	Major Command	Notes
27th Armored Infantry Battalion
9 October 1943	2/52nd Armored Infantry Regiment; Reorganized & redesignated as 27th Armored Infantry Battalion.	Camp Young, California	9th Armored Division	Triangularization program
20 August 1944	Deployment	New York Port of Embarkation (POE)		Assigned to European Theater of War
26 August 1944	Arrival in England			Training & equipping for entry to France
29 August 1944	Arrival in France			Unit prepared to join 9th Armored Division
15 September 1944	Start of Rhineland Campaign			Unit entered combat
16 December 1944	Retasked to Ardennes-Alsace Campaign			
25 January 1945	Ardennes-Alsace Campaign concluded.			Returned to Rhineland Campaign
21 March 1945	Rhineland Campaign concluded			Unit transitioned to Central Europe Campaign
22 March 1945	Start of Central Europe Campaign			Start of final phase of European War.
9 May 1945	Surrender of German forces			Mopping up & start of Occupation
11 May 1945	Central Europe Campaign complete			Moved to occupation location
14 August 1945	Termination of all hostilities	Wunsiedel, Germany		Continued occupation & preparation for DEROS
13 October 1945	Unit arrived at Hampton Roads POE	Newport News, Virginia		Unit prepared for inactivation
27th Armored Infantry Battalion inactivated at Camp Patrick Henry, Virginia
52nd Armored Infantry Battalion
9 October 1943	HHC/52nd Armored Infantry Regiment; Reorganized & Redesignated as 52nd Armored Infantry Battalion	Camp Polk, Louisiana	9th Armored Division	Triangularization
20 August 1944	Deployment	New York POE		Assigned to European Theater
26 August 1944	Arrival in England			Training & equipping for entry to France
29 August 1944	Arrival in France			Unit prepared to join 9th Armored Division
15 September 1944	Start of Rhineland Campaign			Unit entered combat
16 December 1944	Retasked to Ardennes-Alsace Campaign			
25 January 1945	Ardennes-Alsace Campaign concluded.			Unit returned to Rhineland Campaign
21 March 1945	Rhineland Campaign concluded			Unit transitioned to Central Europe Campaign
22 March 1945	Start of Central Europe Campaign			Start of final phase of European War.
9 May 1945	Official Surrender of German Forces			Mop up & start of Occupation
11 May 1945	Central Europe Campaign complete			Moved to occupation location
14 August 1945	Termination of all hostilities	Schonwald, Germany		Unit continued occupation and preparation for DEROS
13 October 1945	Arrived at Hampton Roads POE	Newport News, Virginia		Unit prepared for inactivation
52nd Armored Infantry Battalion inactivated at Camp Patrick Henry, Virginia
60th Armored Infantry Battalion
9 October 1943	1/52nd Armored Infantry Regiment; Reorganized & redesignated as 60th Armored Infantry Battalion	Camp Young, California	9th Armored Division	Triangularization
20 August 1944	Deployment	New York POE		Assigned to European Theater
26 August 1944	Arrival in England			Training & equipping for entry to France
29 August 1944	Arrival in France			Prepared to join 9th Armored Division
15 September 1944	Start of Rhineland Campaign			Entered combat
16 December 1944	Retasked to Ardennes-Alsace Campaign			
25 January 1945	Ardennes-Alsace Campaign concluded.			Returned to Rhineland Campaign
21 March 1945	Rhineland Campaign concluded			Transitioned to Central Europe Campaign
22 March 1945	Start of Central Europe Campaign			Start of final phase of European War.
9 May 1945	Surrender of German forces			Mop up & start of Occupation
11 May 1945	Central Europe Campaign complete			Moved to occupation location
14 August 1945	Termination of all hostilities	Coburg, Germany		Continued occupation & preparation for DEROS
12 October 1945	Unit arrived at Hampton Roads POE	Newport News, Virginia		Prepared for inactivation
60th Armored Infantry Battalion inactivated at Camp Patrick Henry, Virginia

== Company C ==
Company C, 52d Infantry Regiment
- Guidon
- Active: 1917-21; 1942-45 (1943-45 as C/60 AIB); 1950-72 (1953-59 as C/560 AIB) (1959-66 as HHC/3 BG/52 IN); 2000 – present
- Country: United States of America
- Branch: United States Army
- Type: Long Range Surveillance
- Role: Long Range Surveillance
- Size: Company
- Nickname: "Chaos"
- Engagements: World War I World War II; Vietnam; Operation Iraqi Freedom

Commanders
- Current commander: CPT Michael D. Hauser, Previous: Edward M. Cecil, Daniel W. Baker, Bradley J. Goodyear, Matthew Acosta, Chase S. Baker

C Company, 52d Infantry Regiment (Anti-Tank) was a Stryker anti-tank company task organized under 3rd Brigade, 2nd Infantry Division (3-2 Stryker Brigade Combat Team). As a company of 54 infantrymen, the company conducted primarily infantry operations during three deployments in support of Operation Iraqi Freedom. During the first deployment of a Stryker brigade to Iraq (OIF 01-02), soldiers of C-52d IN earned five Bronze Stars, a Meritorious Unit Commendation, and a Superior Unit Award. In the most recent deployment (OIF 06-08) C-52d IN operated in many significantly different roles and environments. Avalanche soldiers earned one Silver Star, 16 Bronze Stars, 17 Purple Hearts and received honors from the Washington State Senate as a company of 3–2 Stryker Brigade Combat Team. C-52d IN was again deployed to Iraq in support of Operation Iraqi Freedom (OIF 09-10) in the Diyala province. Soldiers of C-52d IN worked along the eastern border with Iraqi police and regional border control units. Upon returning to the Fort Lewis, the company changed its nickname from "Avalanche" to "Hellcat" as a reference to the World War II anti-tank infantry. Charlie company also deployed in April 2012 to Afghanistan for nine months in support of operation enduring freedom.

In May 2015 the company was deactivated as an anti-tank infantry company.

On 15 September 2015 the company was reactivated as the I Corps Long Range Survaillance (Airborne) Company attached to the 201st Expeditionary Military Intelligence Brigade and further attached to the 109th Military Intelligence Battalion.

On 15 December 2016, C/52 INF REGT (LRS) (ABN) cased its guidon and the Regimental Colors. The Company officially inactivated on 15 January 2017

=== Lineage ===
- 15 May 1917, constituted in the Regular Army as Company C, 52d Infantry
- 16 June 1917, organized at Chickamauga Park, Georgia
- 16 November 1917, 52d Infantry assigned to the 6th Division
- 1 September 1921, inactivated at Camp Grant, Illinois
- 15 August 1927, 52d Infantry relieved from assignment to the 6th Division and assigned to the 9th Division
- 1 October 1933, relieved from assignment to the 9th Division and assigned to the 6th Division
- 1 October 1940, relieved from assignment to the 6th Division
- 15 July 1942, redesignated as Company C, 52d Armored Infantry, an element of the 9th Armored Division, and activated at Fort Riley, Kansas
- 9 October 1943, reorganized and redesignated as Company C, 60th Armored Infantry Battalion, an element of the 9th Armored Division
- 13 October 1945, inactivated at Camp Patrick Henry, Virginia
- 14 September 1950, redesignated as Company C, 52d Infantry, an element of the 71st Infantry Division
- 25 February 1953, redesignated as Company C, 560th Armored Infantry Battalion, an element of the 9th Armored Division
- 1 March 1957, 560th Armored Infantry Battalion relieved from assignment to the 9th Armored Division
- 1 July 1959, redesignated as Headquarters and Headquarters Company, 3d Battle Group, 52d Infantry
- 23 March 1966, redesignated as Company C, 52d Infantry
- 1 June 1966, activated at Fort Lewis, Washington
- 15 August 1972, inactivated in Vietnam
- 16 September 2000, assigned to the 2d Infantry Division and activated at Fort Lewis, Washington
- May 2015, deactivated as an anti-tank infantry company at Joint Base Lewis-McChord, Washington
- 15 September 2015, activated as Company C 52nd Inf(LRS)(ABN), I Corps. Attached to 201st Expeditionary Military Intelligence Brigade and further attached to 109th Military Intelligence Battalion at Joint Base Lewis-McChord, Washington
- 15 January 2017, inactivated at Joint Base Lewis-McChord, Washington

== C/52 Iraq (OIF 01-02) ==
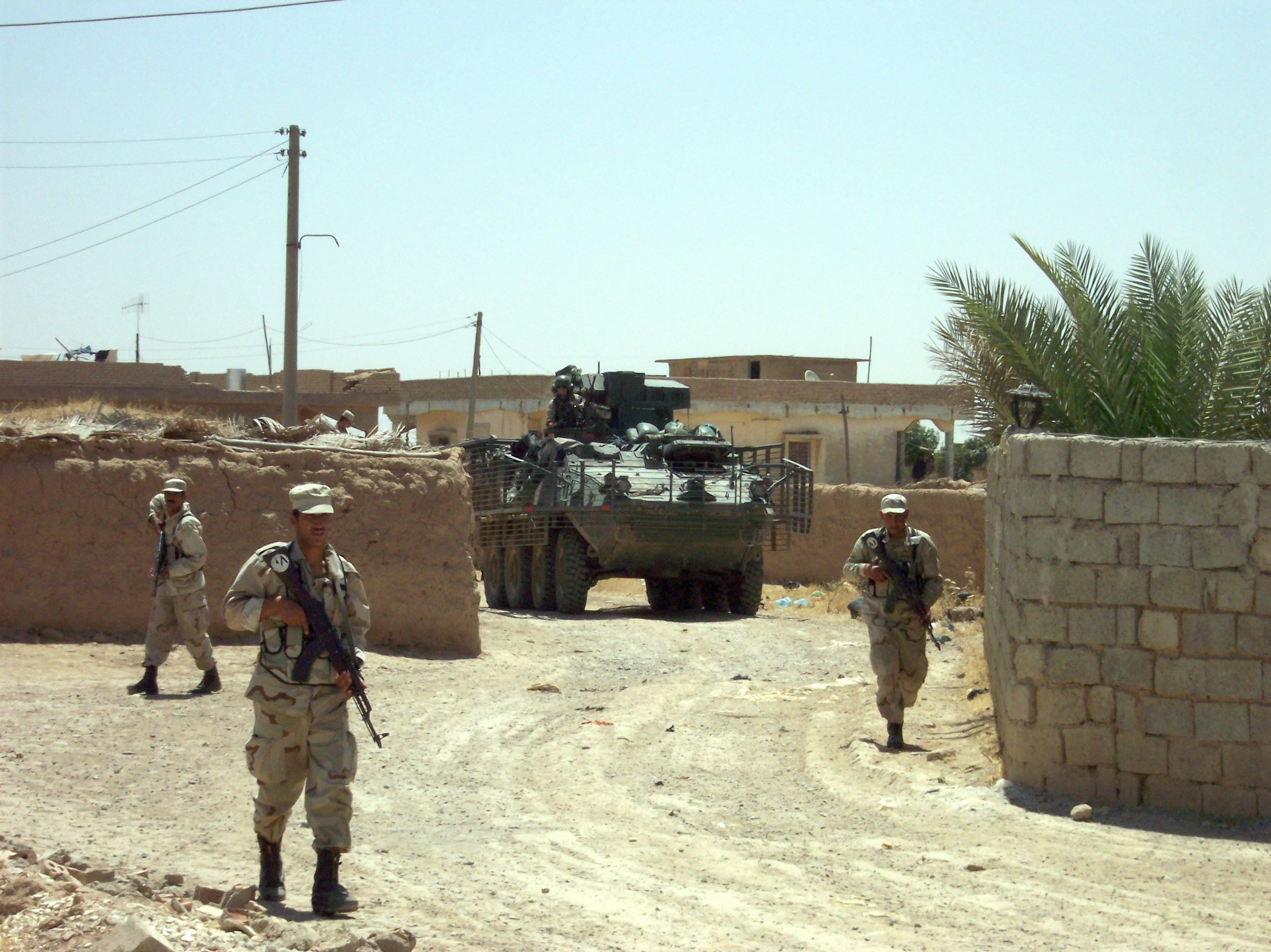
C-52 Patrols with Iraqi National Guard, 2004.

C Company, 52d Infantry Regiment was assigned to 3d Brigade, 2d Infantry Division during its deployment to Iraq in support of Operation Iraqi Freedom 01-02 from November 2003 – November 2004. From December 2003 – January 2004, it supported 4th ID and 3-2 SBCT, the Army's first Stryker brigade, during Operations Arrowhead Blizzard and Arrowhead Polaris, the brigade's successful attack of insurgents in and around Samarra, Iraq During 27 days of continuous combat operations in Samarra, the company contributed to significant losses to the enemy in terms of personnel and equipment and neutralized enemy activity throughout their battalion's area of operations.

Upon completion, the company followed the brigade's movement north in order to conduct a relief in place with 101st Airborne Division in Mosul, Iraq, where they operated out of Forward Operating Base Marez. Avalanche Company was assigned to Task Force Minute, 1st Battalion, 37th Field Artillery under command of LTC Sliwa. During combat and stability operations in the Upper Tigris River Valley south of Mosul, the company conducted over 150 full spectrum missions totaling over 18,000 Stryker miles. The company regularly served as the Task Force Main Effort on many cordon and searches, convoy security, area and route reconnaissance, counter improvised explosive device (IED) sweeps, and counter mortar / area security operations, which resulted in significant losses to the enemy in terms of personnel and equipment, as well as neutralizing enemy activity in the company's area of operations. Such areas as Hammam Al Alil, Ash Sharuh, Qayyarah, Hatra, Makhmur, and Tal Abjah were frequently patrolled.

Some of the operations the company conducted which led to the capture of both battalion or brigade high-value targets, as well as a multitude of caches, included Operations Decimation, H3, Thunderbolt, King's Gambit, Warrior Strike, Avalanche Fury, and Operation Rude Awakening. On 4 June, C-52d IN was also responsible for the training and equipping of the new "Iraqi National Guard," in which the company trained 30 platoons comprising over 1,500 new Iraqi soldiers.

The company successfully redeployed to Fort Lewis in November 2004 with no loss of equipment or life and was subsequently awarded with a Meritorious Unit Commendation and Superior Unit Award for their operations in theater. Avalanche was reassigned to 2nd Battalion, 3rd Infantry Regiment under the command of LTC Flowers and LTC Huggins. The company successfully completed reset in record time and deployed twice to the Yakima Training Center, successfully completing Operations Arrowhead Quiver and Arrowhead Warpath which included both platoon and company maneuver live fires, Stryker gunnery, ATGM gunner's skills testing and TOW tables 1–12.

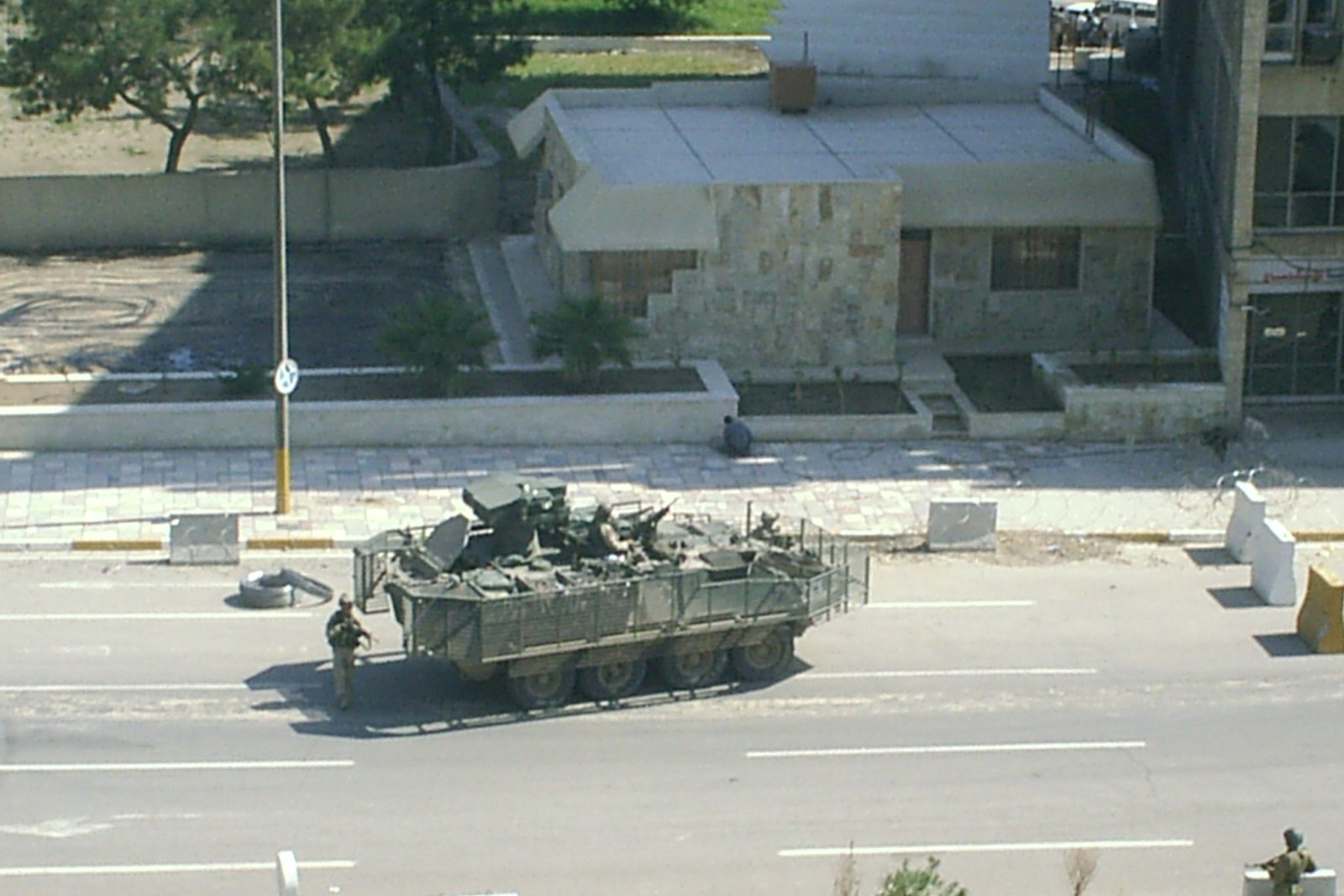
Avalanche soldiers secure a City Hall in Iraq, November 2003.

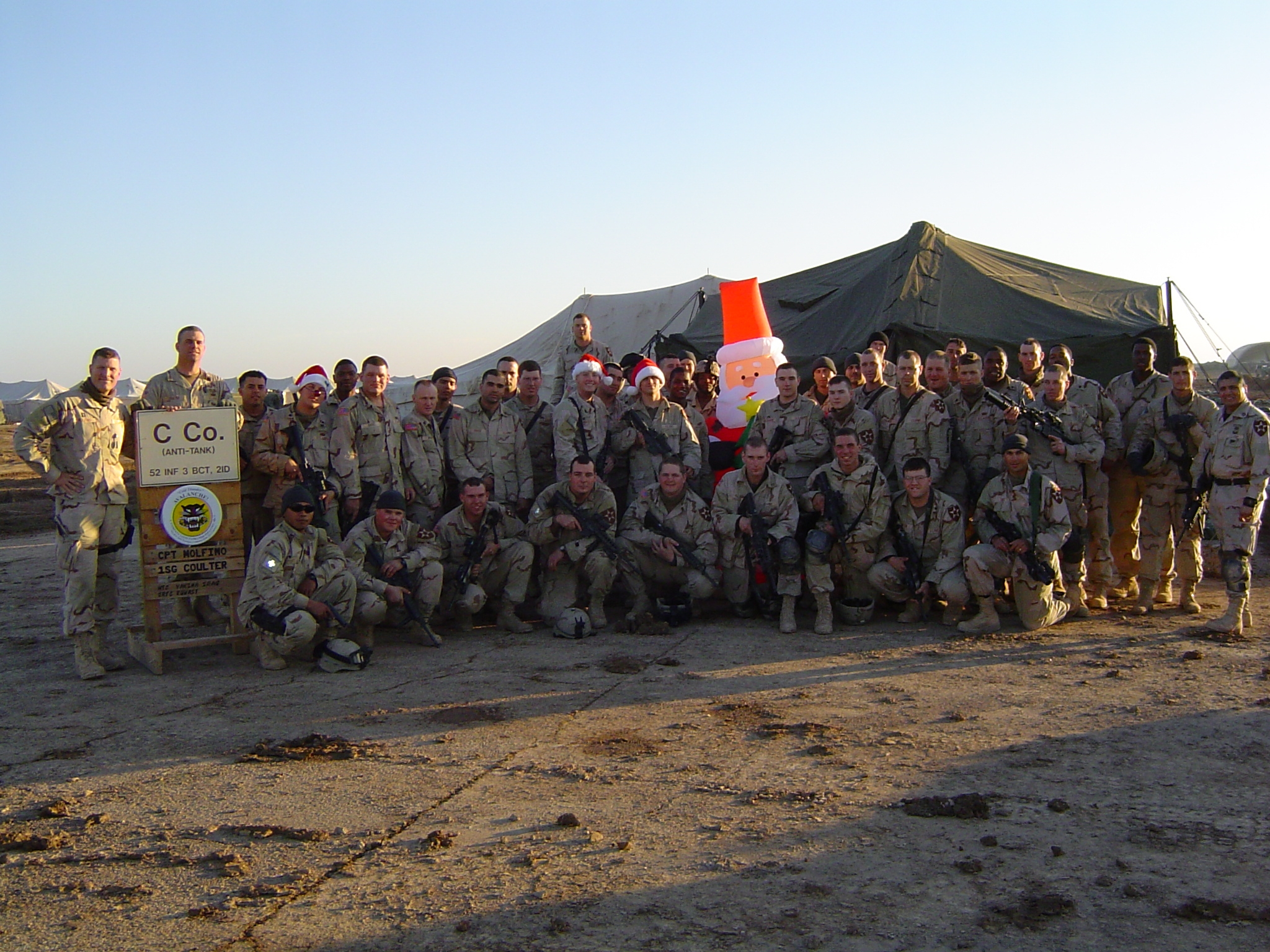
C-52d IN Christmas photo from FOB Pacesetter, Iraq. December 2003.

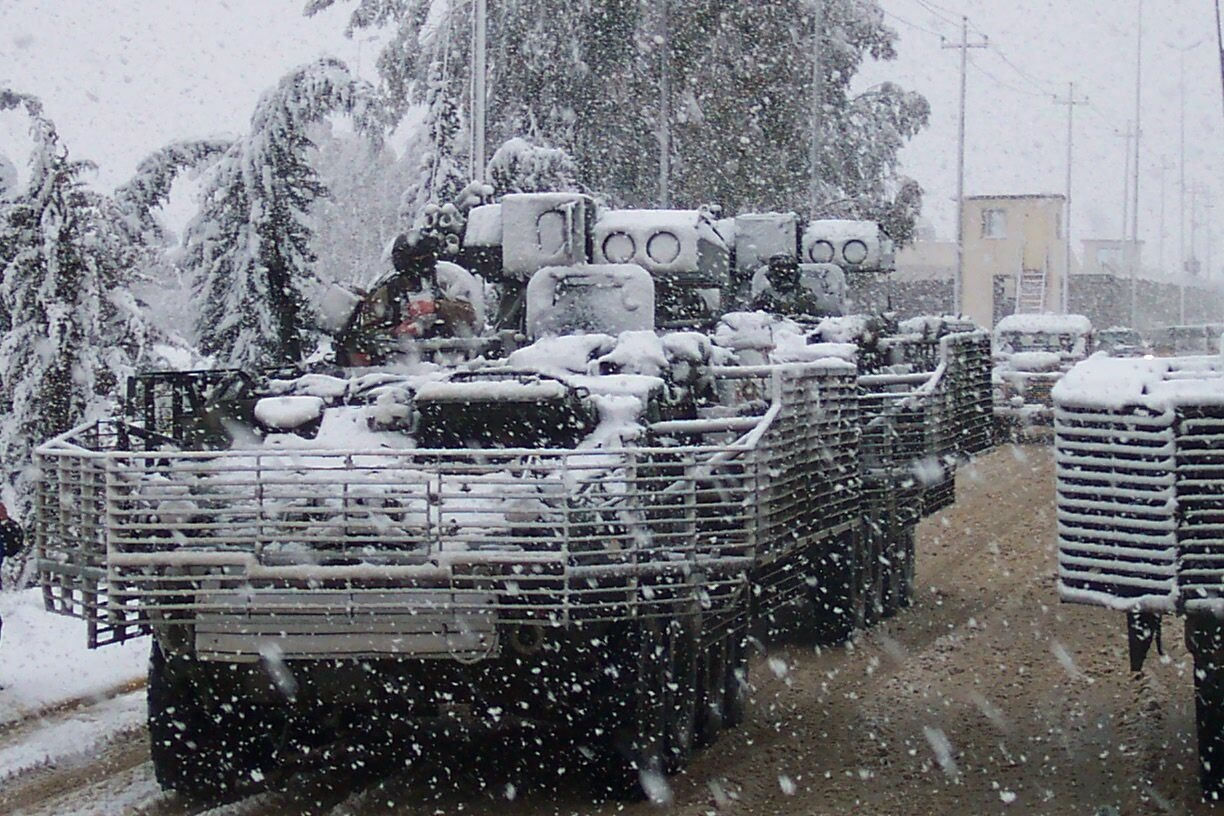
C-52d IN patrols through the snow, January 2004.

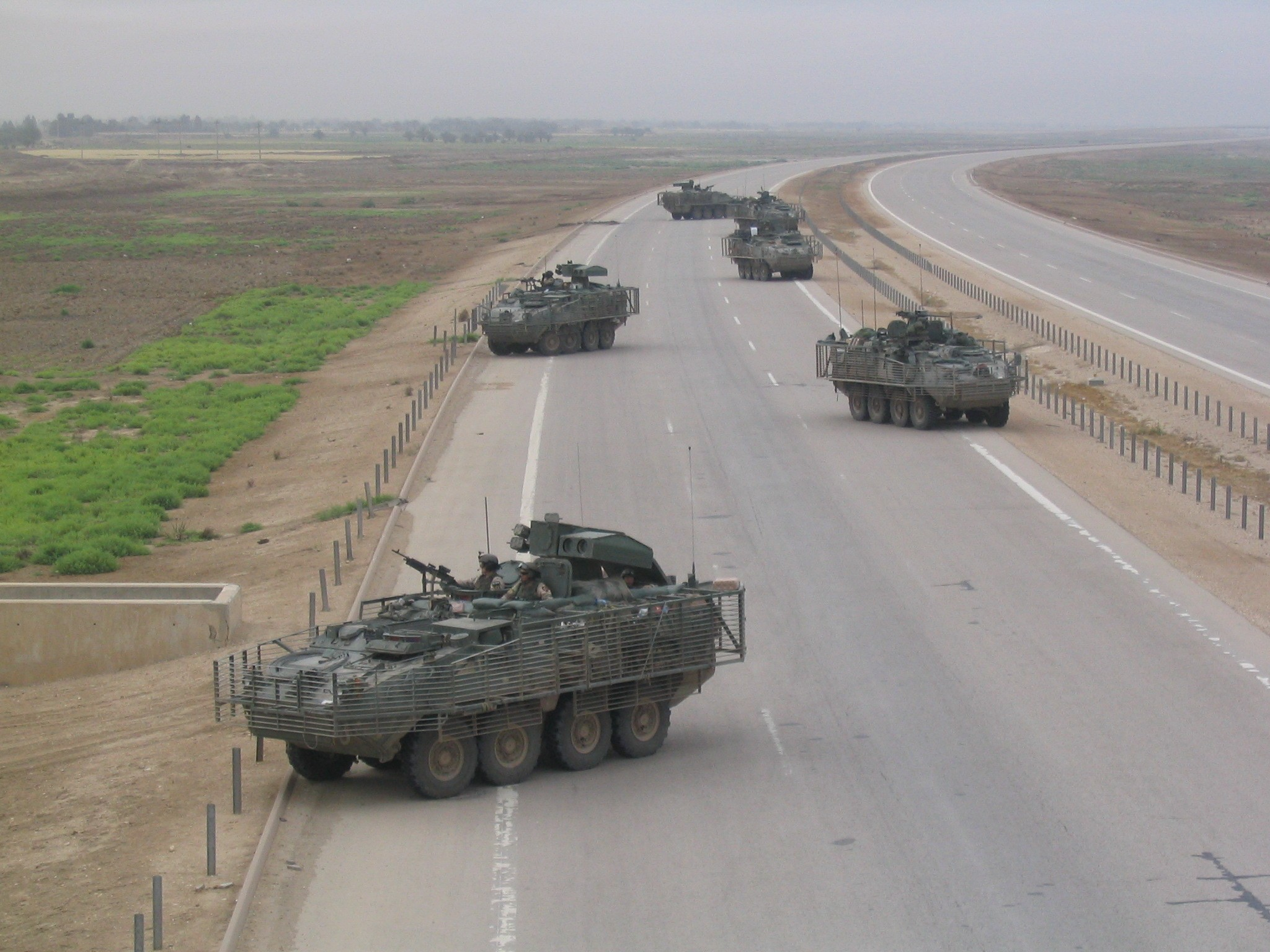
C-52d IN at a security halt in Iraq. June 2004

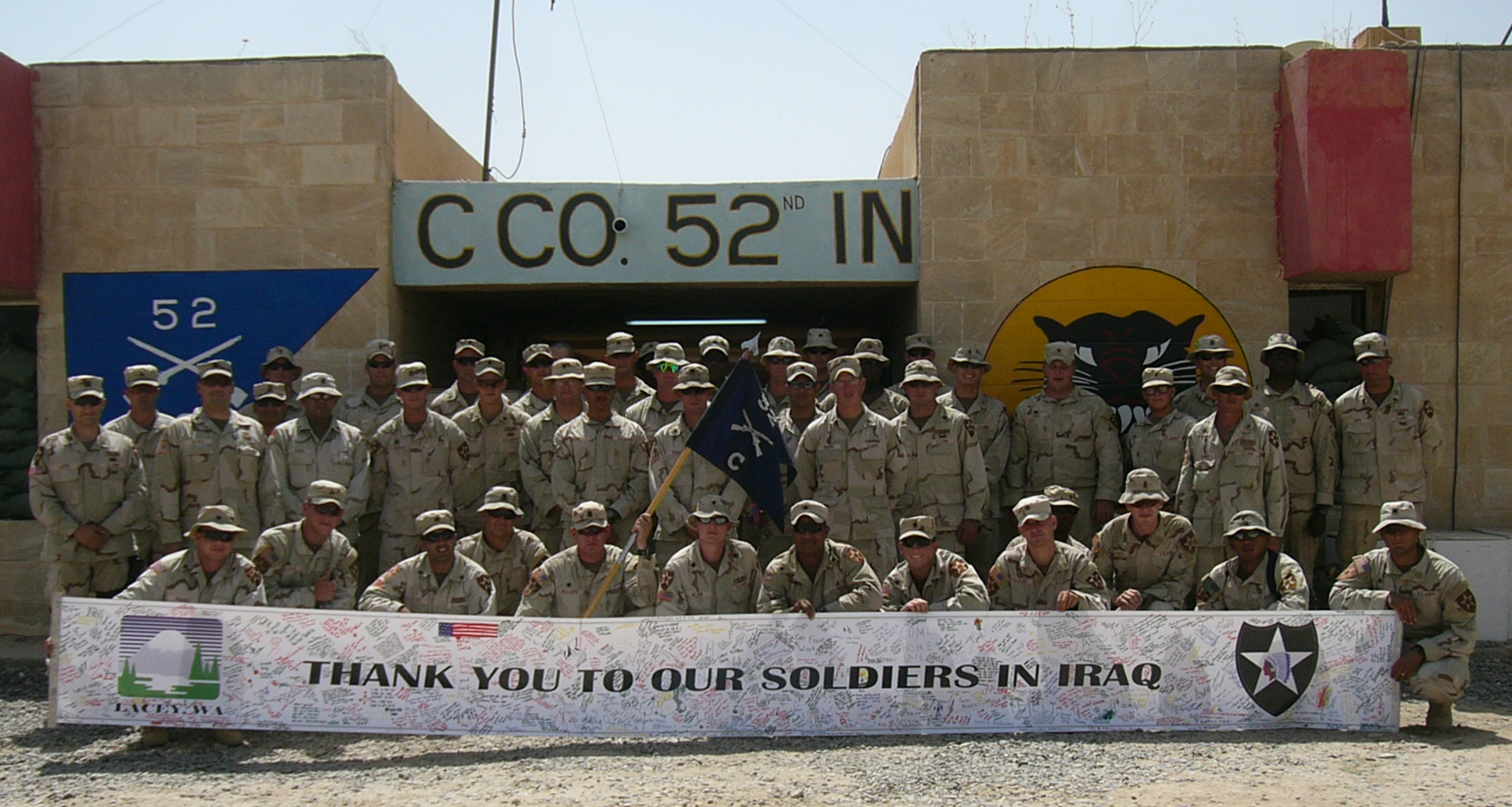
C-52d IN poses with a Thank You banner from Lacey, Washington. August 2004

== C/52 Iraq (OIF 06-07) ==
During an extended 15-month Iraq War deployment (Operation Iraqi Freedom 06-07) from July 2006 – September 2007, the Avalanche Company operated under the command of over eight different higher headquarters. Its operations spanned much of northern and central Iraq. In July and August 2006, C-52d manned a combat outpost in Rabiyah, Iraq in support of 200 personnel for over 30 days, overseeing various military transition teams and all life support operations. In the months of September and October, C-52d operated under Task Force Red Lion in Q-West, conducting assessments of essential services and other security and support operations. Additionally, C-52d conducted clearance operations of Route Tampa resulting in a 75% reduction of IEDs. During late October and November, C-52d operated under 5th Battalion, 20th Infantry Regiment in Mosul, Iraq. The Avalanche Company supported clearing operations and performed assessments of essential services that were valuable to restoring stability.

December marked the Avalanche Company's move to Baghdad as they operated under Task Force Tomahawk. The soldiers of C-52d provided security and conducted several raids during major clearing operations in support of Multi-National Division Baghdad. In late December 2006, C-52d would move to Taji, Iraq, where they would remain through May 2007 in support of 2nd Battalion, 8th Cavalry Regiment. In the company's most notable event, Third Platoon of C-52d responded to a complex attack on a joint security station in Tarmiya, Iraq, enabling the successful evacuation of 21 wounded American soldiers and security of the site. Several members of Third Platoon were awarded Bronze Star Medals for their actions on 19 February 2007. Third Platoon's platoon leader, SFC Ismael Iban, was awarded a Silver Star for gallantry in action.

In Sheik Hamed Village, the company conducted bilateral clearing operations with the Iraqi Army, executed several missions against time-sensitive targets, and trained basic soldier skills to an Iraqi Army Battalion, enhancing their ability to secure their area of operations. C-52d also secured key infrastructure, specifically the Khark Water Treatment Plant, which supplies 75% of Iraq's drinkable water.

In the brigade's culminating mission to expel al Qaeda from Baqubah, their self-proclaimed capital of the Islamic State of Iraq, C-52d conducted a 50 km attack from the march into battle during Operation Arrowhead Ripper. The company's soldiers screened over 2,500 displaced Iraqis attempting to flee Baqubah, resulting in the capture of over 30 armed insurgents. Additionally, C-52d conducted an air assault operation that resulted in the discovery and capture of numerous enemy caches including anti-aircraft artillery, indirect fire weapons, IED making materials and various small arms. It was thought that this operation might severely hamper the enemy's ability to use indirect fire to inflict casualties and instill terror upon the civilian population.

Led by CPT Erich B. Schneider for the entire deployment, the company redeployed to Fort Lewis in September 2007 with no loss of life.

== A/52 Afghanistan 2009/2010 ==
As part of the 3,900 soldiers who deployed from Fort Lewis's 5th Stryker Brigade Combat Team, 2nd Infantry Division Alpha Company 52nd Infantry Division was deployed to Afghanistan instead of Iraq like originally planned. A/52 deployed to Forward Operating Base Lagman in the Zabul province.

== C/52 Afghanistan 2011/2012 ==
In December 2011 3rd Stryker Brigade Combat Team, 2nd Infantry Division deployed to Afghanistan with C/52 being part of it. They deployed to the Zabul Province and was in charge of the entire battle space. C/52 was part of that deployment.

== D/52 Afghanistan 2011/2012 ==
As part of the 1st Stryker Brigade Combat Team, 25th Infantry Division (Arctic Wolves) deployment to Afghanistan Delta Company 52nd Infantry Regiment deployed to Afghanistan in Southern Afghanistan between May 2011 and May 2012. One of their missions was to "train the trainer" and taught local Afghanistan Local Police officers combat and medical training.

== F/52 Afghanistan 2012/2013 ==
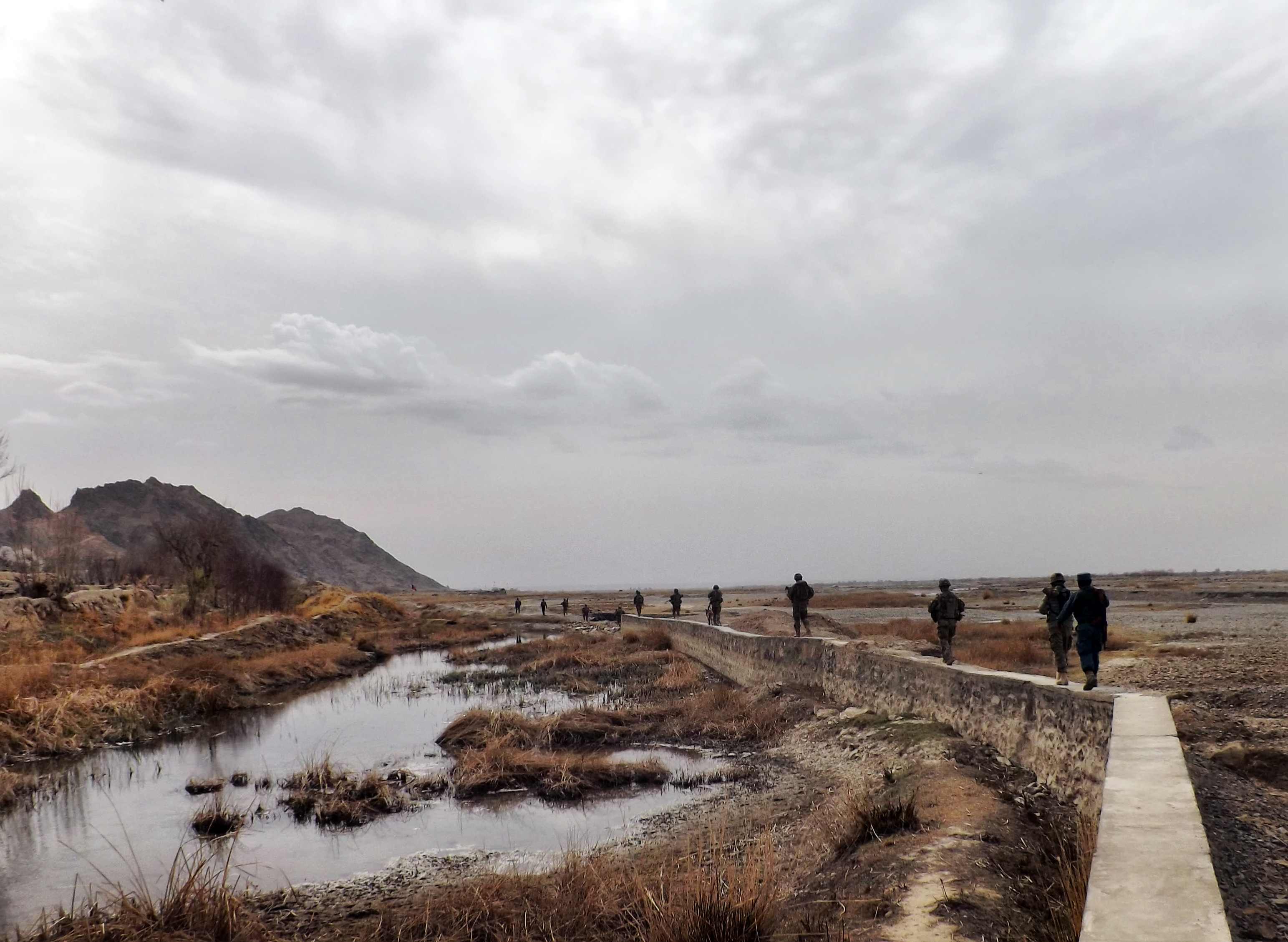
Fierce Company 52nd Infantry along with Scouts and TAC Section of HHC 1/38 conduct the first dismounted patrol in Bazaar-E Panjwai since the Kandahar Massacre. This photo is on the Zhari and Panjwai Border near the Arghandab River.

Fierce Company (F Company) 52nd Infantry Division left at the beginning of January 2013 in support of 4th Brigade Combat Team, 2nd Infantry Divisions (CTF 4-2/CTF Raider) deployment to Southern Afghanistan in the Kandahar Province. During this deployment Fierce Company conducted Intelligence, Surveillance and Reconnaissance missions along with Presence Patrols, Sharia's and Training Missions with both the Afghan Army and the Afghan Police in the area.

The unit would be assigned to 1st Battalion 38th Infantry Regiment "Task Force Rosser" or "Task Force Rock". Fierce Companies area of Responsibility was the majority of Eastern and Central Panjwai to include Bazaar-E Panjwai. They were primarily headquartered out of Forward Operating Base Shoja and assisted in the training and patrols with 6th Kandak, 1st Brigade 205th Afghan Army. Upon arrival to Panjwai Afghanistan the primary role for Fierce Company was to assist Bravo Company (Bayonet Company) 1st Battalion 38th Infantry Regiment in their operations on and around Combat Outpost Sperwan Ghar. Fierce Company would train and assist Local Afghan Police and Afghan Army units in securing the areas of Salawat, Nejat, Alkozi, and Skecha to keep insurgents from their consistent attacks on COP Sperwan Ghar.

In May 2013 Task Force Rosser began outpost and base tear down operations. The Western portion of Fierce Companies area of Operations from Salawat to Sperwan Ghar was handed over to Bayonet Company and Fierce Company took over Headquarters Company (HHC) Area of Operations in the Chalghowr and Salahan area as HHC and other companies began to redeploy. In June 2013 Fierce Company was attached to 4th Battalion 9th Infantry Regiment as all elements of 1st Battalion 38th Infantry Redeployed. Fierce Companies Area of Responsibility grew to all of Eastern and Central Panjwai to the FOB Zangabad area. At this time Fierce Company also took over what would now be Combat Outpost Shoja and began in tearing down the outpost and primarily conducted patrols in the area of Salawat and COP Shoja as a presence patrol in an effort to deter attacks and look for vulnerabilities as the Outpost was now manned by only 60 soldiers. At the end of July 2013 2nd Cavalry Regiment and Combined Task Force Dragoon took over operations from Fierce Company and COP Shoja was handed over.

== Gallery ==
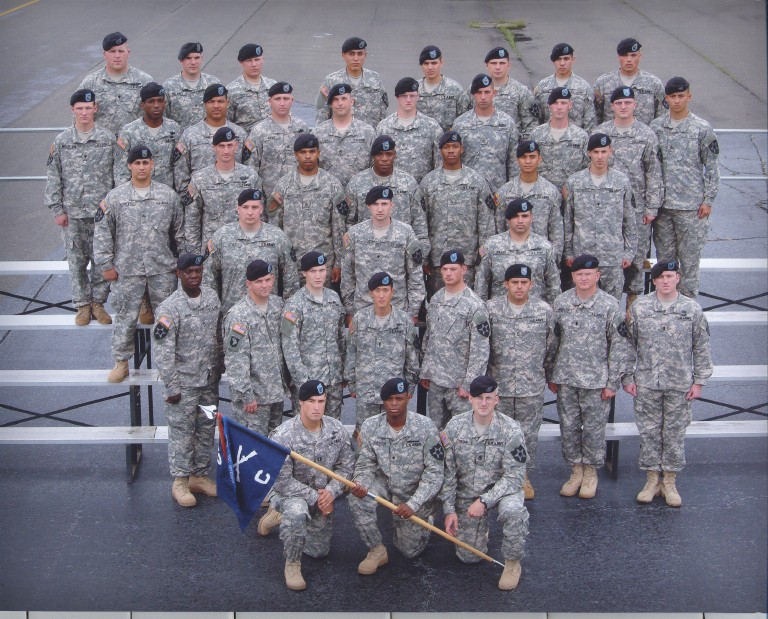
C-52 IN on Gray Army Airfield, Fort Lewis, WA after the BDE's deployment ceremony. June 2006.

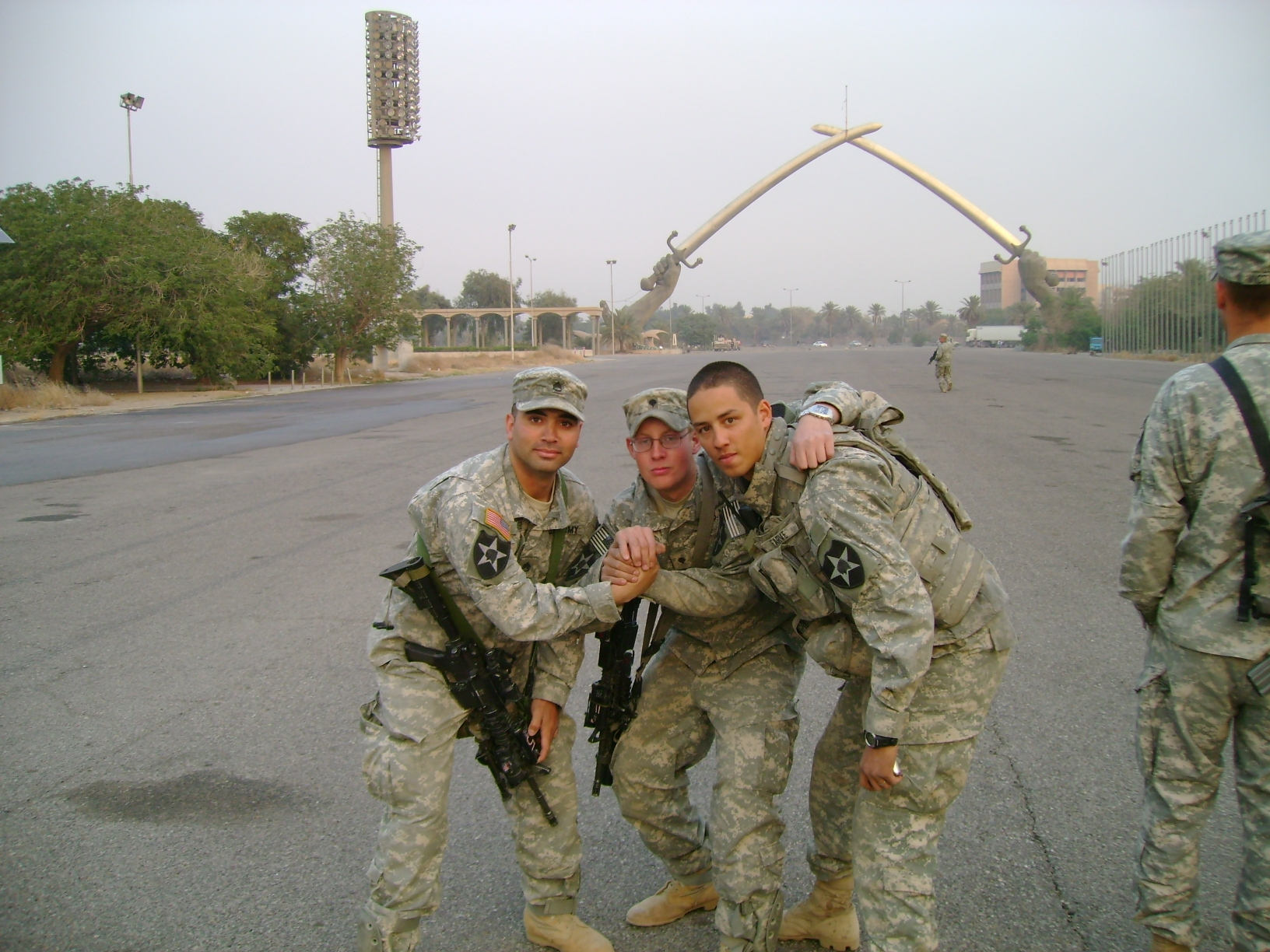
C-52 IN soldiers in Baghdad's Green Zone. 13 December 2006.

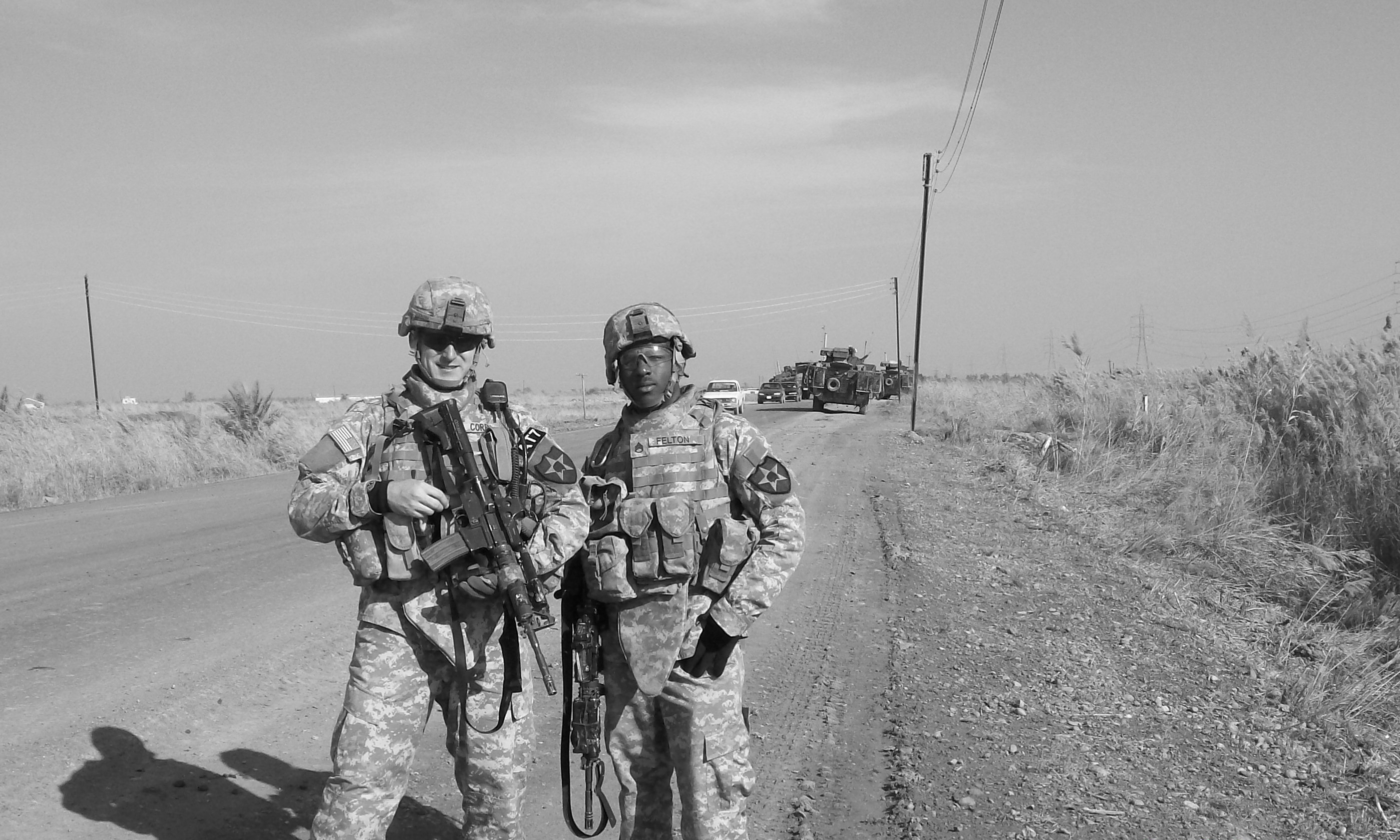
Avalanche Soldiers outside of Baghdad, Iraq. 26 December 2006.

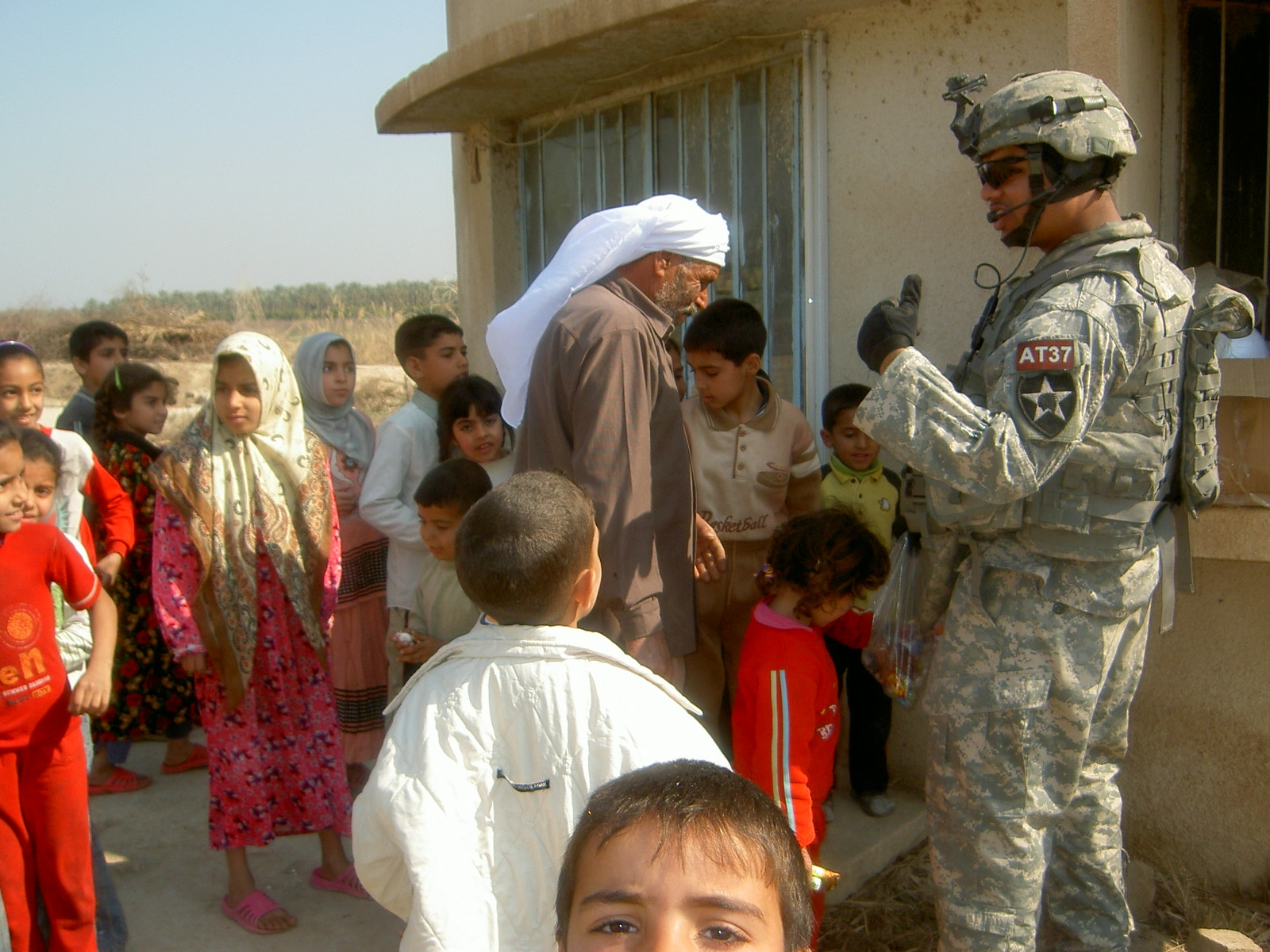
3PLT hands out candy on a patrol in Iraq, 14 February 2007.

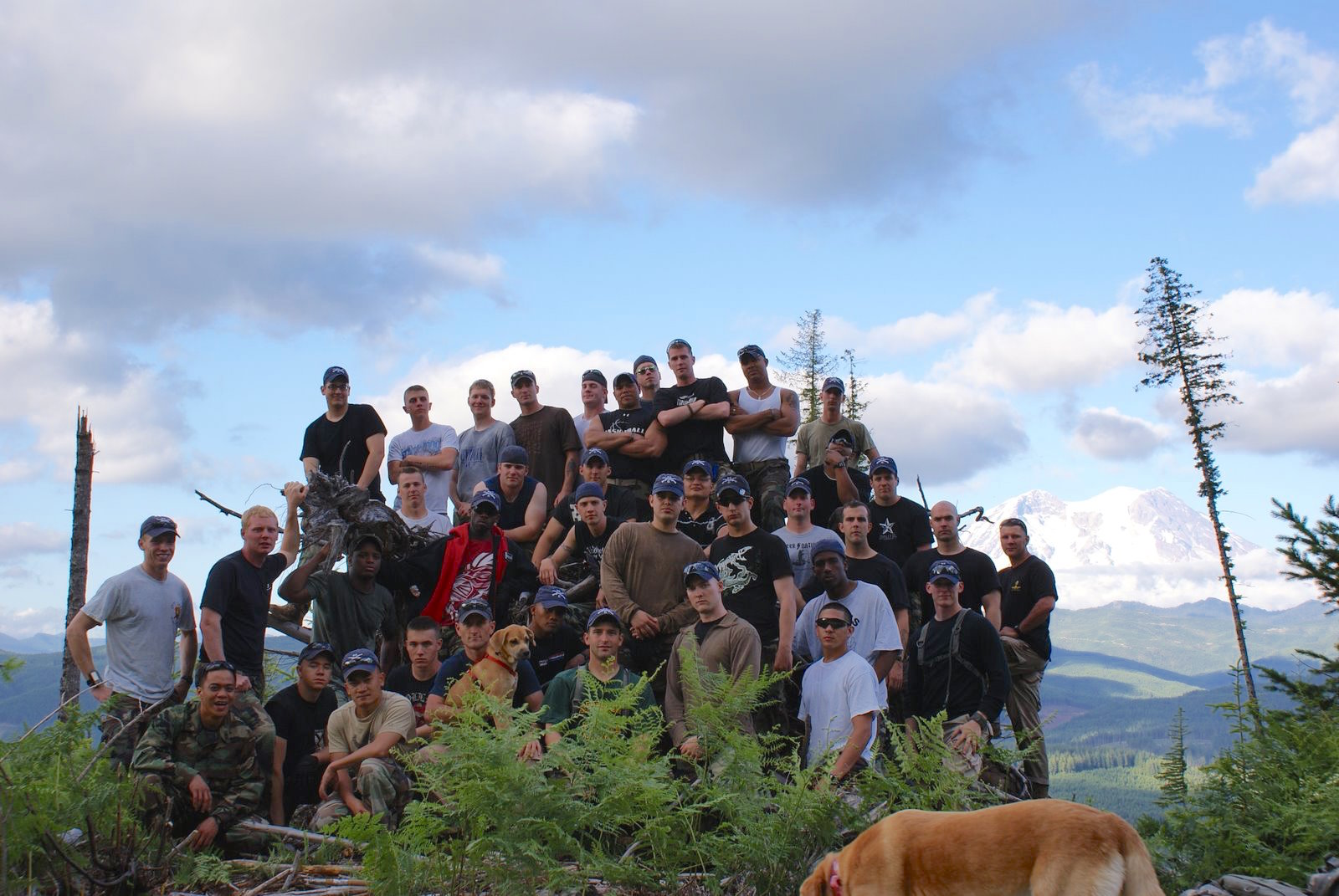
C-52d IN during Operation Cold Thunder, a team building exercise that focused on the history of the company, just west of Mt. Rainier National Park.

== Sources ==
- "1–14 CAV History as of October 2000", GlobalSecurity.org
- "3rd Brigade, 2nd Infantry Division History as of December 2004", GlobalSecurity.org
- "Bridgehead to Victory (At Remagen)", Army Digest, pp. 30–31, March 1980
- "ING Training Evaluation", DVIDS Digital Video & Imagery Distribution System, 26 July 2004
- "Narrow is the Way.", Armor magazine, September–October 1965 (Across the Remagen Bridge in Germany).
- "Perryopolis Soldier Receives Silver Star", Evening Standard, Uniontown, PA., p. 21, 22 May 1968
- "The Institute of Heraldry", tioh.hqda.pentagon.mil, archived from the original on 11 April 2006
- "United States Army Center of Military History", history.army.mil, archived from the original on 12 June 2010
- Lair, Sgt. Patrick (6 September 2007), "Soldiers celebrate flour mill reopening", Northwest Guardian
- Yon, Michael (24 September 2007), "The General Lee Comes Home", michaelyon-online.com
- Yon, Michael (25 July 2007), "Bird's Eye View", michaelyon-online.com
- Yon, Michael (16 July 2007), "Superman", michaelyon-online.com
- Yon, Michael (30 June 2007), "Bless the Beasts and Children", michaelyon-online.com
- Yon, Michael (20 June 2007), "Bread and a Circus, Part II of II", michaelyon-online.com
- Yon, Michael (19 June 2007), "Bread and a Circus, Part I of II", michaelyon-online.com
