= Al Tarmia =

Al Tarmia الطارمية
- Town
- Interactive map of Al Tarmia
- Location within Iraq
- Coordinates: 33.664354°N 44.373779°E
- Country: Iraq
- Governorate: Salah al-Din Governorate
- District: Tarmiya District

Population
  - Total: 91,284

Al Tarmia or Tarmiyah (Arabic: الطارمية) is a town on the Tigris River, located 50 km (31 mi) north of Baghdad, in the Baghdad Governorate of Iraq. It has a population of 91,284. The area is a sparsely populated farming community, with the population primarily consisting of Sunni Muslims from various local tribes, including the Dulaym, Shammar, Al Bu Farraj, and Al Ddury.

Tarmiya was the main site for the electromagnetic isotope separation (EMIS) program, which aimed to enrich uranium. The site included both 1200 mm and 600 mm separators. Tarmiya was the location of 20 calutrons used to enrich uranium to 35%, situated in two buildings on the site. This large facility was designed to house 90 electromagnetic isotope separators, and eight separators were actually placed in operation in September 1990, resulting in the production of approximately half a kilogram of 4% enriched uranium.

The Tarmiya site had no security fence and no visible electrical infrastructure. Only later did inspectors discover that it was powered by a 30-kV underground electrical feed from a 150 MWe substation several kilometers away. Tarmiya was also situated within a large military security zone, thus eliminating the need for additional perimeter security or military defenses at the site. At the same site, the Iraqis constructed a multimillion-dollar “chemical wash” facility for recovering uranium from refurbished calutron components. This facility was reportedly as sophisticated and clean as any in the West, and triple-filtered so as not to release any trace effluents into the atmosphere that might have led to its detection once it began operation.

Prior to the first IAEA inspection after the Gulf War, the only known nuclear facilities in Iraq were those at the Al Tuwaitha nuclear center, where nuclear material was being safeguarded. No other facilities were declared in the initial Iraqi statements. That the Tarmiya facility housed a substantial piece of the Iraqi nuclear program was only confirmed after the Gulf War in the early summer of 1991, when the movement there of large saucer-like objects (just prior to the first IAEA inspection of the site) led to the positive identification of the Iraqi calutron program. Much of the equipment at this site was disassembled unilaterally by Iraq, and the components hidden from IAEA inspector teams. These parts were eventually turned over to IAEA personnel and destroyed in place.

As a result of the second IAEA inspection, the Tarmiya industrial center was revealed as a site for the electromagnetic isotope separation process (EMIS), a facility capable of producing nuclear-weapons-usable material. This was a large site still in the installation stage, although some production units had begun operation and a small quantity of low-enriched uranium had been produced. Iraq declared to the first IAEA inspection team that the site was a plant for manufacturing transformers, an implausible claim. When its true nature was established, later inspections showed that extensive deception had taken place, including laying fresh concrete to hide evidence of the machinery that had been installed and walls which had been painted to hide the presence of uranium.

The Tarmiyah large-scale calutron facility was located in Building 33, which was over 100 meters long, with the capability to support about 100 calutron units. Tarmiyah is also the location of a calutron facility, which would have served as a second-stage "topping off" plant, taking enriched uranium from the first-stage large-scale calutron facilities and enriching it to weapons-grade. The smaller calutron facility was located in Building 245, and included room for about 20 calutrons. Both buildings were 6 to 18 months away from being operational at the time of the Gulf War.

During the Iraq War, Sunni insurgents were active in Tarmiyah from 2003 onwards, and Al-Qaeda in Iraq (AQI) took control of the area in 2006. AQI forces in Tarmiyah were commanded by Abu Ghazwan until he was killed in 2008.
