= List of mass car bombings =

This is a list of car bomb attacks (including bombs stowed in vans, trucks, buses, and other motor vehicles) that resulted in at least two deaths.

== Mass car bombings (by date) ==
=== 2020s ===
Date^{YYYY‑MM‑DD}	Country	City	Deaths	Type	More info
2020-04-28	Syria	Afrin	53	truck bomb	Main article: 2020 Afrin bombing
2021-03-05	Somalia	Mogadishu	21	car bomb	Main article: March 2021 Mogadishu bombing
2021-04-21	Pakistan	Quetta	5	car bomb	Main article: Quetta Serena Hotel bombing
2021-05-08	Afghanistan	Kabul	90	car bomb	Main article: 2021 Kabul school bombing
2021-09-25	Somalia	Mogadishu	8	car bomb	
2021-10-06	Syria	Al-Bab	18	truck bomb	
2021-10-10	Yemen	Aden	6	car bomb	
2021-11-25	Somalia	Mogadishu	8	SUV bomb	Main article: November 2021 Mogadishu bombing
2021-12-20	Afghanistan	Kabul	9	car bomb	
2022-10-29	Somalia	Mogadishu	100+	car bombs	perpetrator: Al-Shabaab Main article: October 2022 Mogadishu bombings
2023-01-04	Somalia	Mogadishu	35	car bomb	perpetrator: Al-Shabaab
2023-09-23	Somalia	Beledweyne	18+	truck bomb	
2023-10-29	Somalia	Mogadishu	6	car bomb	
2024-03-30	Syria	Azaz	8	car bomb	Main article: 2024 Azaz bombing
2025-08-21	Colombia	Cali	7	car bomb	Main article: FARC dissidents
2025-11-10	India	New Delhi	13	car bomb	Main article: 2025 Delhi car explosion

=== 2010s ===
Date^{YYYY‑MM‑DD}	Country	City	Deaths	Type	More Info
2019-01-17	Colombia	Bogotá	21	suicide car bomb	Main article: 2019 Bogotá car bombing
2019-01-21	Afghanistan	Maidan Shar	126	car bomb	Main article: Maidan Shar attack
2019-02-14	India	Pulwama	40+	car bomb	Main article: 2019 Pulwama attack
2018-01-27	Afghanistan	Kabul	103+	bomb in ambulance	Main article: Kabul ambulance bombing
2017-10-14	Somalia	Mogadishu	587	truck bomb	Main article: 14 October 2017 Mogadishu bombings
2017-05-31	Afghanistan	Kabul	90+	car bomb	Main article: May 2017 Kabul attack
2017-04-15	Syria	Aleppo	126+	car bomb	Main article: 2017 Aleppo suicide car bombing
2016-11-24	Iraq	Hillah	125	truck bomb	Main article: November 2016 Hillah suicide truck bombing
2016-07-03	Iraq	Baghdad	323+	truck bomb	Main article: 2016 Karrada bombing
2016-07-03	Iraq	Baghdad	5	car bomb	Main article: 2016 Karrada bombing
2016-05-17	Iraq	Baghdad	30	car bomb	Main article: May 2016 Baghdad bombings
2016-05-17	Iraq	Baghdad	6	car bomb	Main article: May 2016 Baghdad bombings
2016-05-17	Iraq	Baghdad	8	car bomb	Main article: May 2016 Baghdad bombings
2016-01-11	Iraq	Baghdad	12	car bomb	Main article: January 2016 Iraq attacks
2012-10-3	Syria	Aleppo	40	three suicide car bombs	Main article: October 2012 Aleppo bombings
2012-09-09	Syria	Aleppo	30	car bomb	
2012-07-31	Iraq	Baghdad	21	two car bombs	
2012-07-23	Iraq	13 cities	116	suicide bombs, car bombs, shootings	Main article: 23 July 2012 Iraq attacks
2012-06-13	Iraq	Baghdad, 6 other cities	93	suicide car bombs, shootings	Main article: 13 June 2012 Iraq attacks
2012-05-19	Syria	Deir ez-Zor	9	car bomb	Main article: 2012 Deir ez-Zor bombing
2012-05-10	Syria	Damascus	55	suicide car bombs	Main article: 10 May 2012 Damascus bombings
2012-04-30	Syria	Idlib	20	car bombs	Main article: April 2012 Idlib bombings
2012-04-8	Nigeria	Kaduna	38	suicide car bombs	Main article: April 2012 Kaduna bombings
2012-03-31	Thailand	Yala; Hat Yai	16	car and trucks bombs	Main article: 2012 Southern Thailand bombings
2012-03-20	Iraq	Baghdad, 9 other cities	52	car bombs, suicide car bombs, shootings	Main article: 20 March 2012 Iraq attacks
2012-03-17	Syria	Damascus	27	two car bombs	Main article: March 2012 Damascus bombings
2012-02-23	Iraq	Baghdad, 14 other cities	83	suicide car bombs, shootings	Main article: 23 February 2012 Iraq attacks
2012-02-10	Syria	Aleppo	28	suicide car bombs	Main article: 2012 Aleppo bombings
2012-01-27	Iraq	Baghdad	32	suicide car bomb	Main article: 27 January 2012 Baghdad bombing
2012-01-10	Pakistan	Jamrud	30	car bomb	Main article: 2012 Khyber Agency bombing
2012-01-5	Iraq	Baghdad; Nasiriyah	73	suicide car/motorcycle bombs, shootings	Main article: 5 January 2012 Iraq bombings
2011-12-23	Syria	Damascus	44	suicide car bombs	Main article: 2011 Damascus bombings
2011-12-22	Iraq	Baghdad	60–72	suicide car bombs	Main article: 22 December 2011 Baghdad bombings
2011-09-25	Iraq	Karbala	25	car bomb, suicide bombings	Main article: 2011 Karbala bombing
2011-10-7 to 13	Iraq	Baghdad	64	car bombs, suicide bombs, IEDs, shootings	Main article: October 2011 Baghdad bombings
2011-08-16	Nigeria	Abuja	21	suicide car bomb	Main article: 2011 Abuja United Nations bombing
2011-07-22	Norway	Oslo	8	van bomb	Main article: 2011 Norway attacks
2011-06-25	Afghanistan	Logar Province	20–35	suicide car bomb	Main article: 2011 Logar province bombing
2011-06-16	Nigeria	Abuja	2–6	suicide car bomb	Main article: 2011 Abuja police headquarters bombing
2011-05-26	China	Fuzhou, Jiangxi	3	suicide car bombs	Main article: 2011 Fuzhou, Jiangxi bombings
2011-05-13	Pakistan	Charsadda District	98	suicide car bombs	Main article: 2011 Charsadda bombing
2011-05-05	Iraq	Al Hillah	24	suicide car bomb	Main article: 2011 Al Hillah bombing
2011-03-9	Pakistan	Peshawar	40	suicide car bomb	Main article: March 2011 Peshawar bombing
2011-03-08	Pakistan	Faisalabad	25	car bomb	Main article: 2011 Faisalabad bombing
2011-01-27	Iraq	Baghdad	48	car bomb	Main article: 27 January 2011 Baghdad bombing
2011-01-24	Iraq	Baghdad; Karbala	27	car bombs, roadside bombs	Main article: 24 January 2011 Iraq bombings
2011-01-18 to 20	Iraq	Baqubah, Karbala, Tikrit	137	car bombs, suicide car bombs, shooting	Main article: January 2011 Iraq suicide attacks
2010-12-6	Pakistan	Ghalanai	50	suicide car bombs	Main article: December 2010 Mohmand Agency bombings
2010-11-11	Pakistan	Karachi	18	suicide car bombs, grenades, shootings	Main article: Pakistan CID building attack
2010-11-02	Iraq	Baghdad	57–62	car bombs, roadside bombs	Main article: November 2010 Baghdad bomb attacks
2010-10-01	Nigeria	Abuja	12	two car bombs	Main article: October 2010 Abuja attacks
2010-09-19	Iraq	Baghdad	31	car bombs, remote bomb	Main article: 19 September 2010 Baghdad bombings
2010-08-17	Iraq	Baghdad	69	truck bomb, suicide bomb	Main article: 17 August 2010 Baghdad bombings
2010-06-20	Iraq	Baghdad	26	two suicide car bombs	Main article: 20 June 2010 Baghdad bombings
2010-05-10	Iraq	Baghdad, 8 other cities.	100	suicide car bombs, shootings	Main article: 10 May 2010 Iraq attacks
2010-04-23 to 24	Iraq	Baghdad	85	car bombs	Main article: April 2010 Baghdad bombings
2010-04-05	Pakistan	Peshawar	50	suicide car bombs	Main article: 2010 Peshawar bombing
2010-04-04	Iraq	Baghdad	42	car bombs	Main article: 4 April 2010 Baghdad bombings
2010-03-18	Afghanistan	Kabul	18	suicide car bomb	Main article: May 2010 Kabul bombing
2010-03-12	Pakistan	Lahore	72	suicide car bombs	Main article: March 2010 Lahore bombings
2010-03-3	Iraq	Baqubah	33	suicide car bombs	Main article: 2010 Baqubah bombings
2010-02-10	Pakistan	Khyber Agency	19	suicide car bomb	Main article: February 2010 Khyber bombing
2010-02-25	Iraq	Baghdad	41	three suicide car bombs	Main article: 25 January 2010 Baghdad bombings
2010-01-1	Pakistan	Shah Hasan Khel	105	suicide car bomb	Main article: 2010 Lakki Marwat suicide bombing

=== 2000s ===
Date^{YYYY‑MM‑DD}	Country	City	Deaths	Type	More info
2010-12-18	Pakistan	Timergara	12	suicide car bomb	Main article: December 2009 Lower Dir mosque bombing
2010-12-15	Pakistan	Dera Ghazi Khan	33	car bomb	Main article: 2009 Dera Ghazi Khan bombing
2010-12-08	Iraq	Baghdad	127	suicide car bombs	Main article: 8 December 2009 Baghdad bombings
2010-11-19	Pakistan	Peshawar	10	car bomb	Main article: 2009 Peshawar judicial complex bombing
2010-11-02	Pakistan	Rawalpindi	35	motorcycle bomb	Main article: November 2009 Rawalpindi bombing
2010-10-28	Pakistan	Peshawar, North-West Frontier Province	92	car bomb	Main article: 28 October 2009 Peshawar bombing
2010-10-25	Iraq	Baghdad	155	car bombs (2)	Main article: 25 October 2009 Baghdad bombings
2010-10-12	Pakistan	Shangla District, Swat Valley	41	suicide car bomb against military vehicle	Main article: 2009 in Pakistan
2010-10-11	Iraq	Ramadi, Al Anbar Governorate	26	coordinated car bombs (3), including one suicide car bomb	Main article: 2009 in Iraq
2010-10-09	Pakistan	Peshawar, North-West Frontier Province	48	car bomb	Main article: 9 October 2009 Peshawar bombing
2010-10-08	Afghanistan	Kabul	17	suicide car bomb	Main article: 2009 Kabul Indian embassy attack
2010-09-17	Somalia	Mogadishu	21	car bombs (2)	Main article: 2009 African Union base bombing in Mogadishu
2010-08-25	Afghanistan	Kandahar	43	car bomb	Main article: 25 August 2009 Kandahar bombing
2010-08-15	Afghanistan	Kabul	7	suicide car bomb, attempted assassination	Main article: 2009 NATO Afghanistan headquarters bombing
2010-08-19	Iraq	Baghdad	101	car and truck bombs	Main article: 19 August 2009 Baghdad bombings
July 4, 2010	Philippines	Mindanao	8	bombs, car bomb	Main article: July 2009 Mindanao bombings
2010-06-30	Iraq	Kirkuk	40	suicide car bomb	Main article: 2009 Kirkuk bombing
2010-06-24	Iraq	Baghdad	65	motorcycle bomb	Terrorist incidents in Iraq in 2010
2010-06-20	Iraq	Taza	80	truck bomb	Main article: 20 June 2009 Taza bombing
2010-06-18	Somalia	Beledweyne	35	car bomb	
2010-06-10	Iraq	Al Batha	30	car bomb	Terrorist incidents in Iraq in 2010
2010-06-09	Pakistan	Peshawar	17	car bomb	Main article: Pearl Continental hotel bombing
2010-05-27	Pakistan	Lahore	30	car bomb, shooting	Main article: 2009 Lahore bombing
2010-05-20	Iraq	Baghdad	38	car bomb	Terrorist incidents in Iraq in 2010
2010-04-29	Iraq	Baghdad	52	car bombs (2)	Main article: 23 April 2009 Iraqi suicide attacks
2010-04-06	Iraq	Baghdad	37	car bombs (6)	Main article: 6 April 2009 Baghdad bombings
2010-02-22	Somalia	Mogadishu	11	car bomb	Main article: 2009 African Union base bombing in Mogadishu
2009-01-24	Somalia	Mogadishu	15	car bomb	
2009-12-28	Pakistan	Buner District	36	car bomb	
2009-12-05	Pakistan	Peshawar	29	car bomb	Main article: 5 December 2008 Peshawar bombing
2009-11-06	Pakistan	Bajaur Agency	22	car bomb	
2009-10-29	Somalia	Bosaso and Hargeisa	30	car bombs (5)	Main article: October 2008 Hargeisa–Bosaso bombings
2009-10-10	Pakistan	Orakzai Agency	110	car bomb	Main article: 10 October 2008 Orakzai bombing
2009-09-29	Lebanon	Tripoli	7	car bomb	Main article: 2008 Tripoli, Lebanon bombing
2009-09-28	Iraq	Baghdad	32	bombs, car bombs	Main article: 28 September 2008 Baghdad bombings
2009-09-27	Syria	Damascus	17	car bomb	Main article: 2008 Damascus car bombing
2009-09-20	Pakistan	Islamabad	60	truck bomb	Main article: Islamabad Marriott Hotel bombing
2009-09-12	Iraq	Dujail	32	car bomb	Main article: 2008 Dujail bombing
2009-09-06	Pakistan	20 km from Peshawar	30	car bomb	Main article: September 2008 Peshawar bombing
2009-08-23	Pakistan	Swat	20	suicide car bomb	Main article: 2008 Swat Valley bombing
2009-08-19	Algeria	Issers	44	car bomb	Main article: 2008 Issers bombing
2009-07-07	Afghanistan	Kabul	58	car bomb	Main article: 2008 Indian Embassy bombing in Kabul
2009-06-17	Iraq	Baghdad	65	car bomb	Main article: 17 June 2008 Baghdad bombing
2009-06-02	Pakistan	Islamabad	6–8	car bomb	Main article: 2008 Danish embassy bombing
2009-05-02	Yemen	Sa'dah	15	car bomb	Main article: 2008 Bin Salman Mosque bombing
2009-04-15	Iraq	Baquba	53	car bomb	Terrorist incidents in Iraq in 2009
2009-02-18	Afghanistan	Spin Boldak	38	suicide car bomb	Main article: Spin Boldak bombing
2009-02-16	Pakistan	Parachinar	47	car bomb	Main article: 2008 Parachinar bombing The attack left at least 47 people dead and 150 injured
2008-02-10	Iraq	Balad	33	car bomb	Main article: 2008 Balad bombing
2008-12-13	Iraq	Amarah	46	3 car bombs	Main article: 2007 Al Amarah bombings
2008-12-12	Iraq	Amarah	46	car bombs (3)	
2008-12-11	Algeria	Algiers	31	suicide car bombs (2)	Main article: December 11, 2007 Algiers bombings
2008-12-09	Pakistan	Matta, Swat District	10	car bomb	
2008-11-24	Pakistan	Rawalpindi	35	car bombs (2)	
2008-09-08	Algeria	Dellys	30	car bomb	Main article: 2007 Dellys bombing
2008-08-14	Iraq	Yazidi compounds in Kahtaniya	796	truck bombs (4)	Main article: 2007 Yazidi communities bombings
2008-08-01	Iraq	Baghdad	74	truck bomb, car bombs (2)	Main article: 1 August 2007 Baghdad bombings
2008-07-26	Iraq	Baghdad	92	car bomb	Main article: 26 July 2007 Baghdad market bombing
2008-07-25	Iraq	Baghdad	50	car bombs (2)	
2008-07-19	Iraq	Baghdad	87	car bomb	Main article: 2007 al-Khilani Mosque bombing
2008-07-19	Pakistan	Hub	30	car bomb	
2008-07-16	Iraq	Kirkuk	86	car bombs (3)	Main article: 2007 Kirkuk bombings
2008-07-15	Pakistan	Matta, Swat District	17	car bomb (2)	11 police officers among the dead. 47 wounded.
2008-07-14	Pakistan	Miranshah	23	car bomb	At least 23 paramilitary troops died and 27 others injured
2008-07-07	Iraq	Armili	156	truck bomb	Main article: 2007 Amirli bombing
2008-06-19	Iraq	Baghdad	75	car bomb	Main article: Al-Khilani Mosque bombing
2008-06-17	Afghanistan	Kabul	35	car bomb	
2008-05-13	Iraq	Makhmour	50	suicide truck bomb	Main article: 2007 Makhmour bombing
2008-05-06	Iraq	Baghdad	35	car bomb	
2008-04-28	Iraq	Karbala	68	car bomb	Main article: Imam Abbas Mosque bombing
2008-04-18	Iraq	Baghdad	198	car bombs (4)	Main article: 18 April 2007 Baghdad bombings
2008-04-14	Iraq	Karbala	65	car bomb	Main article: Imam Hussein Mosque bombing
2008-04-11	Algeria	Algiers	33	car bombs (2)	Main article: 11 April 2007 Algiers bombings
2008-03-29	Iraq	Khalis	47	car bombs (3)	Terrorist incidents in Iraq in 2008
2008-03-27	Iraq	Tal Afar	152	truck bombs (2)	Main article: 2007 Tal Afar bombings
2008-02-18	Iraq	Baghdad	62	car bombs (2)	Main article: 18 February 2007 Baghdad bombings
2008-02-14	Iran	Zahedan	18	car bomb	Main article: 2007 Zahedan bombings
2008-02-12	Iraq	Baghdad	79	car bombs (3)	Main article: 12 February 2007 Baghdad bombings
2008-02-03	Iraq	Baghdad	135	truck bomb	Main article: 3 February 2007 Baghdad market bombing
2008-01-22	Iraq	Baghdad	88	car bombs (2)	Main article: 22 January 2007 Baghdad bombings
2007-01-16	Iraq	Baghdad	70	suicide car bombs, school bombings	Main article: Mustansiriya University bombings
2007-12-30	Spain	Madrid	2	van bomb	Main article: 2006 Madrid-Barajas Airport bombing
2007-12-12	Iraq	Baghdad	71	minibus bomb, car bomb	Terrorist incidents in Iraq in 2007
2007-12-02	Iraq	Baghdad	51	car bombs (3)	Terrorist incidents in Iraq in 2007
2007-11-23	Iraq	Sadr City	215	car bombs (6)	Main article: 23 November 2006 Sadr City bombings
2007-10-16	Sri Lanka	Digampathana	100	truck bomb	Main article: 2006 Digampathana truck bombing
2007-08-03	Afghanistan	Panjwayi	21	car bomb	
2007-07-01	Iraq	Sadr City	66	car bomb	Main article: 1 July 2006 Sadr City bombing
2006-03-12	Iraq	Sadr City	58	car bombs (2)	Terrorist incidents in Iraq in 2006
2006-11-19	Iraq	Abu Sayda	50	car bomb	Terrorist incidents in Iraq in 2006
2006-11-18	Iraq	Khanaqin	74	suicide car bombs	Main article: 2005 Khanaqin bombings
2006-09-29	Iraq	Balad	102	car bombs (3)	Main article: 2005 Balad bombings
2006-09-14	Iraq	Baghdad	114	car bomb	Main article: 14 September 2005 Baghdad bombing
2006-08-17	Iraq	Baghdad	43	car bombs (3)	Main article: 17 August 2005 Baghdad bombings
2006-07-23	Egypt	Sharm el-Sheikh	88	car bombs (2)	Main article: 2005 Sharm el-Sheikh attacks
2006-07-16	Iraq	Mussayib	98	truck bomb	Main article: 2005 Musayyib bombing
2006-02-28	Iraq	Hilla	125	car bomb	Main article: 2005 Al Hillah bombing
2005-02-14	Lebanon	Beirut	22	truck bomb	
2005-12-19	Iraq	Karbala and Najaf	67	car bombs (2)	Terrorist incidents in Iraq in 2005
2005-10-07	Egypt	Hilton Taba, Taba	31	truck bomb	
2005-10-07	Pakistan	Multan	40	car bomb	
2005-09-30	Iraq	Baghdad	41	car bombs (3)	Terrorist incidents in Iraq in 2005
2005-09-14	Iraq	Police station, Baghdad	47	car bomb	Terrorist incidents in Iraq in 2005
2005-09-09	Indonesia	Australian Embassy, Jakarta	9	van bomb	Main article: 2004 Jakarta embassy bombing
2005-07-28	Iraq	Police station, Baquba	68	suicide car bomb	Terrorist incidents in Iraq in 2004
2005-06-24	Iraq	Police stations, Mosul	62	car bombs (5)	
2005-06-18	Iraq	Baghdad	35	suicide car bomb	Terrorist incidents in Iraq in 2004
2005-06-17	Iraq	Iraqi army recruitment center, Baghdad	35	car bomb	
2005-05-15	Iraq	Mosul	62	car bombs	Main article: 2004 Mosul bombings
2005-05-13	Iraq	Karbala, Najaf	67	suicide car bombs	Terrorist incidents in Iraq in 2005
2005-04-21	Iraq	Police stations, Basra	74	car bombs (4)	Main article: 21 April 2004 Basra bombings
2005-02-11	Iraq	Iraqi Army facility, Baghdad	47	car bomb	
2005-02-10	Iraq	Police Station, Iskandariya	53	truck bomb	Terrorist incidents in Iraq in 2005
2004-01-18	Iraq	Coalition Headquarters, Baghdad	31	truck bomb	Terrorist incidents in Iraq in 2004
2004-12-27	Iraq	Coalition targets, Karbala	19	car bombs (4)	Main article: 2003 Karbala bombings
2004-12-25	Pakistan	Rawalpindi	14	truck bombs	Targeted Pervez Musharraf
2004-11-20	Turkey	British targets, Istanbul	32	truck bombs	Main article: 2003 Istanbul Bombings
2004-11-15	Turkey	Two synagogues, Istanbul	31	truck bombs	Main article: 2003 Istanbul Bombings
2004-11-12	Iraq	Italian Military HQ in Nasiriyah	33	truck bomb	Main article: 2003 Nasiriyah bombing
2004-11-08	Saudi Arabia	Riyadh	18	truck bomb	
2004-10-27	Iraq	Baghdad	35	car bombs (4)	Main article: 27 October 2003 Baghdad bombings
2004-08-29	Iraq	Imam Ali Mosque, Najaf	85	car bomb	Main article: Imam Ali Mosque bombing
2004-08-25	India	Mumbai	52	car bombs (2)	Main article: 25 August 2003 Mumbai bombings
2004-08-19	Iraq	United Nations Iraqi Headquarters, Baghdad	22	truck bomb	Main article: Canal Hotel bombing
2004-08-07	Iraq	Jordanian Embassy, Baghdad	19	truck bomb	Main article: 2003 Jordanian embassy bombing in Baghdad
2004-08-05	Indonesia	Jakarta	12	car bomb	Main article: 2003 Marriott Hotel bombing
2004-08-01	Russia	Mozdok, North Ossetia–Alania	50	truck bomb	
2004-05-12	Saudi Arabia	Riyadh	35	car bombs (4)	Main article: Riyadh compound bombings
2004-05-12	Russia	Znamenskoye, Chechnya	59	truck bomb	Main article: 2003 Znamenskoye suicide bombing
2003-02-07	Colombia	Bogotá	36	car bomb	Main article: 2003 El Nogal Club bombing
2003-12-27	Russia	Government buildings, Grozny, Chechnya	72	truck bombs	Main article: 2002 Grozny suicide bombing
2003-11-28	Kenya	Hotel in Mombasa	13	car bomb	Main article: 2002 Mombasa attacks
2003-10-21	Israel	Bus near Hadera	14	car bomb	
2003-10-12	Indonesia	Bali	202	car bomb	Main article: 2002 Bali terrorist bombing
2003-09-05	Afghanistan	Kabul	30	car bomb	Main article: 2002 Kabul bombing
2003-06-14	Pakistan	US consulate, Karachi	12	truck bomb	Main article: 2002 Karachi consulate attack
2003-06-05	Israel	Megiddo Junction	17	car bomb	
2003-05-08	Pakistan	Karachi	14	car bomb	Main article: 2002 Karachi bus bombing
2003-04-11	Tunisia	Synagogue, Djerba	21	truck bomb	Main article: Ghriba synagogue bombing
2003-04-07	Colombia	Villavicencio	12	car bomb	
2002-03-21	Peru	U.S. Embassy, Lima	9	car bomb	Main article: 2002 Lima bombing
2002-12-01	Israel	Jerusalem	11	suicide car bomb	Main article: Ben Yehuda Street bombings
2002-10-01	India	Assembly Building, Srinagar, Jammu and Kashmir	38	car bomb	Main article: 2001 Jammu and Kashmir legislative assembly attack
2002-06-19	Russia	Gudermes, Chechnya	12	car bombs (3)	
2001-03-24	Russia	Mineralnye Vody, Stavropol Krai	19	car bomb	
2001-08-01	Indonesia	Central Jakarta	2	car bomb	Main article: 2000 Philippine consulate bombing
2000-07-03	Russia	Grozny, Chechnya	25	truck bomb	Main article: July 2000 Chechnya suicide bombings

=== 1990s ===
Date^{YYYY‑MM‑DD}	Country	City	Deaths	Type	More Info
1999-09-04	Russia	Russian military apartment, Buinaksk, Dagestan	307	car bomb	Main article: Russian apartment bombings
1999-02-16	Uzbekistan	Tashkent	16	6 car bombs	Main article: 1999 Tashkent bombings
1999-09-05	Russia	Apartment, Makhachkala, Dagestan	17	car bomb	Main article: Russian apartment bombings
1999-08-15	United Kingdom	Omagh, Northern Ireland	29	car bomb	Main article: Omagh bombing
1999-08-07	Kenya; Tanzania	Nairobi and Dar es Salaam	224	car bombs (2)	Main article: 1998 United States embassy bombings
1999-03-05	Sri Lanka	Street, Colombo	36	mini-bus bomb	
1998-02-14	India	Coimbatore	46	car bombs	Main article: 1998 Coimbatore bombings
1998-11-19	India	Hyderabad	23	car bomb	
1997-10-15	Sri Lanka	World Trade Center, Colombo	18	truck bomb	
1997-12-25	India	Arai Mile, Dimapur, Nagaland	5	car bomb	Main article: 1996 Dimapur car bombing
1997-06-25	Saudi Arabia	Khobar Towers, Khobar (near Dhahran)	20	fuel truck bomb	Main article: Khobar Towers bombing
1997-02-09	United Kingdom	Docklands, London	2	truck bomb	Main article: 1996 South Quay bombing
1996-01-31	Sri Lanka	Central Bank, Colombo	90	truck bomb	Main article: Central Bank Bombing
1996-12-21	Pakistan	Peshawar	45	car bomb	{{Citation needed}}
1996-11-19	Pakistan	Egyptian embassy in Islamabad	15	truck bomb	Main article: Attack on the Egyptian Embassy in Pakistan
1996-11-13	Saudi Arabia	U.S. military headquarters in Riyadh	7	car bomb	
1996-02-27	Iraq	Zakho	76	car bomb	
1995-01-30	Algeria	Algiers	42	car bomb	
1995-04-19	United States	Alfred P. Murrah Federal Building, Oklahoma City	168	truck bomb	Main article: Oklahoma City bombing
1995-07-18	Argentina	Jewish center, Buenos Aires	85	car bomb	Main article: 1994 AMIA bombing
1994-04-06	Israel	Afula	8	car bomb	Main article: Afula Bus suicide bombing
1994-06-21	Spain	Madrid	7	car bomb	
1994-04-24	United Kingdom	London	1	truck bomb	Main article: Bishopsgate bombing
1994-05-27	Italy	Uffizi Gallery, Florence	6	car bomb	
1993-03-12	India	Mumbai	257	car bombs	Main article: 1993 Bombay bombings
1993-02-26	United States	World Trade Center, New York City	6	truck bomb	Main article: 1993 World Trade Center bombing
1993-01-30	Colombia	Bogotá	20	car bomb	
1993-07-16	Peru	Lima	24	car bombs (2)	Main article: Tarata bombing
1993-04-10	United Kingdom	Baltic Exchange, London	3	truck bomb	
1992-03-17	Argentina	Israeli Embassy, Buenos Aires	29	car bomb	Main article: 1992 Israeli Embassy attack in Buenos Aires
1992-05-29	Spain	Vic	9	car bomb	Main article: 1991 Vic bombing
1991-03-02	Sri Lanka	Colombo	19	remote control car bomb	Main article: Havelock Road Bombing, 1991
1990-05-12	Colombia	Bogotá and Cali	26	car bombs (2)	

=== 1980s ===
Date^{YYYY‑MM‑DD}	Country	City	Deaths	Type	More info
1989-12-06	Colombia	Bogotá	52	truck bomb	Main article: DAS Building bombing
1989-11-22	Lebanon	Beirut	24	car bomb	
1989-04-14	Sri Lanka	Trincomalee	38	car bomb	
1989-07-08	Afghanistan	Jalalabad	31	truck bomb	
1989-04-23	Lebanon	Tripoli	60	truck bomb	
1989-04-14	Italy	USO Club, Naples	5	car bomb	
1988-02-17	South Africa	Oshakati, South-West Africa	27	car bomb	Main article: 1988 Oshakati bomb blast
1988-12-11	Spain	Zaragoza	11	car bomb	Main article: 1987 Zaragoza Barracks bombing
1988-10-08	Afghanistan	Kabul	27	car bomb	
1988-07-14	Pakistan	Karachi	72	car bombs (2)	
1988-07-05	Sri Lanka	Army camp, Jaffna	40	truck bomb	Main article: Vallipuram Vasanthan
1988-06-19	Spain	Barcelona	21	car bomb	Main article: 1987 Hipercor bombing
1987-04-21	Sri Lanka	Colombo	106	car bomb	Main article: Central Bus Station Bombing
1987-08-19	Iran	Tehran	20	car bomb	
1987-07-14	Spain	Madrid	12	car bomb	Main article: Plaza República Dominicana bombing
1987-03-27	Australia	Victoria Police HQ, Melbourne	1	car bomb	Main article: Russell Street Bombing
1986-03-17	Syria	Military compound, Damascus	60	truck bomb	
1986-08-17	Lebanon	Market, Beirut	55	car bomb	
1986-05-22	Lebanon	Beirut	50	car bomb	
1985-03-08	Lebanon	Beirut	80	car bomb	Main article: 1985 Beirut Car Bombing
1985-08-08	West Germany	Rhein-Main Air Base, Frankfurt	2	car bomb	Red Army Faction
1984-09-20	Lebanon	U.S. embassy in Beirut	23	car bomb	
1984-12-21	Lebanon	French Army building, Beirut	15	truck bomb	
1984-12-17	England	London	6	car bomb	Main article: Harrods bombing
1984-12-12	Kuwait	U.S. and French embassies, Kuwait City	6	truck bombs	Main article: 1983 Kuwait bombings
1984-11-04	Lebanon	Israeli Army HQ, Tyre	60	truck bomb	Main article: Tyre headquarters bombings
1984-10-23	Lebanon	United States Marines and French Paratroop barracks, Beirut	305	truck bombs	Main article: 1983 Beirut barracks bombing
1984-05-20	South Africa	Church Street, Pretoria	20	car bomb	Main article: Church Street bombing
1984-04-18	Lebanon	U.S. Embassy, Beirut	63	car bomb	Main article: April 1983 US Embassy bombing
1983-01-28	Lebanon	Palestine Liberation Organisation building, Beirut	45	car bomb	
1983-11-11	Lebanon	Israeli military HQ, Tyre	102	car bomb	Main article: Tyre headquarters bombings
1983-10-01	Iran	Central Square, Tehran	60	truck bomb	
1983-08-01	Iraq	Baghdad	20	car bomb	
1983-07-20	United Kingdom	Hyde Park parade, London	4	car bomb	Main article: Hyde Park and Regent's Park bombings
1982-05-24	Lebanon	French embassy, Beirut	14	car bomb	
1982-12-15	Lebanon	Iraqi embassy, Beirut	61	car bomb	
1982-11-29	Syria	Damascus	64	car bomb	
1981-10-01	Lebanon	Palestine Liberation Organisation office, Beirut	83	car bomb	Mossad

=== 1970s ===
Date ^{YYYY‑MM‑DD}	Country	Place	Deaths	Type	Perpetrator, actual or suspected	Source/Article
1979-01-22	Lebanon	Beirut, Lebanon	8	car bomb	Mossad	perpetrator: Ali Hassan Salameh
1978-02-08	United Kingdom	Maghera, Northern Ireland	2	car bomb	Provisional IRA	
1977-04-20	United Kingdom	Belfast, Northern Ireland	2	car bomb	Ulster Volunteer Force	
1976-08-21	United States	Washington, D.C.	2	car bomb	DINA	Washington D.C. bombing
1976-08-16	United Kingdom	Keady, Northern Ireland	2	car bomb	Ulster Volunteer Force	
1976-03-17	United Kingdom	Dungannon, Northern Ireland	4	car bomb	Ulster Volunteer Force	
1975-12-19	Ireland	Dundalk	2	car bomb	Ulster Volunteer Force	
1974-05-17	Ireland	Dublin; Monaghan	33	car bombs (4)	Ulster Volunteer Force	Dublin and Monaghan bombings
1974-01-11	United Kingdom	Derry, Northern Ireland	2	car bomb	Official IRA	
1973-06-12	United Kingdom	Coleraine, Northern Ireland	6	car bomb	Provisional IRA	1973 Coleraine bombings
1973-05-17	United Kingdom	Omagh, Northern Ireland	5	car bomb	Provisional IRA	
1973-01-14	United Kingdom	Derry, Northern Ireland	2	car bomb	Provisional IRA	
1972-12-28	Ireland	Belturbet	2	car bomb	Ulster Volunteer Force	
1972-12-01	Ireland	Dublin	2	car bombs (2)	Ulster Volunteer Force	
1972-10-31	United Kingdom	Belfast, Northern Ireland	2	car bomb	Ulster Defence Association	Main article: Benny's Bar bombing
1972-09-30	United Kingdom	Belfast, Northern Ireland	2	car bomb	Ulster Volunteer Force	
1972-09-14	United Kingdom	Belfast, Northern Ireland	3	car bomb	Ulster Volunteer Force	
1972-08-26	United Kingdom	Enniskillen, Northern Ireland	2	car bomb	Provisional IRA	
1972-07-31	United Kingdom	Claudy, Northern Ireland	9	car bombs (3)		Main article: Claudy bombing
1972-07-21	United Kingdom	Belfast, Northern Ireland	9	car bombs (22)	Provisional IRA	Main article: Bloody Friday (1972)
1972-05-24	West Germany	United States Army base, Heidelberg	3	car bomb	Red Army Faction	List of attacks attributed to the RAF
1972-05-11	West Germany	United States Army base, Frankfurt	1	car bomb	Red Army Faction	List of attacks attributed to the RAF
1972-03-20	United Kingdom	Belfast, Northern Ireland	7	car bomb	Provisional IRA	Main article: 1972 Donegall Street bombing
1972-03-15	United Kingdom	Belfast, Northern Ireland	2	car bomb	Provisional IRA	
1972-02-22	United Kingdom	British Army base, Aldershot, England	7	car bomb	Official IRA	Main article: 1972 Aldershot Bombing
1970-08-24	United States	University of Wisconsin–Madison, Madison, Wisconsin	1	truck bomb	Karleton Armstrong, Dwight Armstrong, David Fine, Leo Burt	Main article: Sterling Hall bombing

=== 1900–1969 ===
Date ^{YYYY‑MM‑DD}	Country	Place	Deaths	Type	Article/Source
1965-03-30	South Vietnam	US Embassy, Saigon	21	car bomb	
1962-05-02	Algeria	Algiers	62	car bomb	
1948-03-11	British Mandate for Palestine	Jewish Agency, Jerusalem	11	car bomb	
1948-03-02	British Mandate for Palestine	Office building, Haifa	14	truck bomb	
1948-02-22	British Mandate for Palestine	Ben Yehuda Street, Jerusalem	52–80	truck bombs (2)	Main article: Ben Yehuda Street Bombing
1948-01-04	British Mandate for Palestine	Jaffa	18	truck bomb	
1947-04-25	British Mandate for Palestine	Sarona police compound, Tel Aviv	5	truck bomb	
1947-01-12	British Mandate for Palestine	Haifa	4	truck bomb	
1927-05-18	United States	Bath Township, Michigan	5 in car bombing, 45 overall	suicide car bomb	Main article: Bath School disaster Perpetrator: Andrew Kehoe
1920-09-16	United States	Wall Street, New York City	38	wagon bomb	Main article: Wall Street bombing

== See also ==
- Deaths by car bombing
