= List of deaths by car bombing =

This is a list of deaths caused by car bombing as the primary method.

Date	Country	Place	Type	Target	Perpetrator/ Suspected perpetrator
2025/04/25	Russia	Moscow	car bomb	Yaroslav Moskalik, Lieutenant general in the Russian Armed Forces	
2022/08/20	Russia	Bolshiye Vyazyomy	car bomb	Darya Dugina, journalist and activist	
2017/10/17	Malta	Bidnija	car bomb (remote)	Daphne Caruana Galizia, journalist and blogger	Unknown, pending investigation
2017/06/27	Ukraine	Kyiv	car bomb	Maksym Shapoval, Chief officer of Ukrainian intelligence agency	
2016/07/20	Ukraine	Kyiv	car bomb	Pavel Sheremet, Belarusian journalist and human rights activist.	
2011/04/02	United Kingdom	Killyclogher, Northern Ireland	car bomb	Ronan Kerr, PSNI officer	Dissident republicans
2008/11/17	Israel	Tel Aviv	car bomb	Yaakov Alperon, Israeli mobster	
2008/10/23	Croatia	Zagreb	motorcycle bomb (remote)	Ivo Pukanić, Croatian journalist（with one other）	Serbian mafia
2007/07/09	China	Jinan	car bomb (remote)	Liu Haiping, Official of the natural resources department of Jinan.	
2005/12/12	Lebanon	Beirut	car bomb (remote)	Gebran Tueni, lawmaker	Strugglers for the Unity and Freedom of al-Sham
2005/06/28	Iraq	Baghdad	suicide car bomb	Dhari Ali al-Fayadh, Iraqi politician	Al-Qaeda in Iraq
2005/06/21	Lebanon	Beirut	car bomb (remote)	George Hawi, former Lebanese Communist Party head	
2005/06/02	Lebanon	Beirut	car bomb (remote)	Samir Kassir, journalist	
2005/02/14	Lebanon	Beirut	suicide truck bomb	Rafic Hariri, former Lebanese Prime Minister (with 20 others)	
2004/05/17	Iraq	Baghdad	suicide car bomb	Ezzedine Salim, Iraqi Governing Council leader	Al-Qaeda in Iraq
2004/02/13	Qatar	Doha	car bomb (remote)	Zelimkhan Yandarbiyev, former President of Chechen Republic of Ichkeria	GRU
2003/11/20	Turkey	Istanbul	suicide truck bomb	Roger Short, British Consul-General (with 27 others)	
2003/09/17	Denmark	Glostrup	car bomb (remote)	Mickey Larsen, outlaw biker	Bandidos Motorcycle Club
2003/08/29	Iraq	Najaf	car bomb (remote)	Ayatollah Mohammed Baqr al-Hakim, Iraqi cleric (with 84 others)	
2003/08/19	Iraq	Baghdad	suicide truck bomb	Sérgio Vieira de Mello, United Nations special representative (with 22 others)	Al-Qaeda in Iraq
2002/05/20	Lebanon	Beirut	unknown	Mohammed Jihad Ahmed Jibril, son of PFLP-GC leader Ahmed Jibril	
2002/01/24	Lebanon	Beirut	car bomb (remote)	Elie Hobeika, Phalangist militia leader	
2000/02/22	Spain	Vitoria	car bomb (remote)	Fernando Buesa, Basque Socialist Party leader	ETA
1999/10/21	Turkey	Ankara	car bomb (tilt-based)	Ahmet Taner Kışlalı, prominent Turkish intellectual, lawyer, politician	
1999/03/15	United Kingdom	Lurgan, Northern Ireland	car bomb (tilt-based)	Rosemary Nelson, Irish human rights lawyer	Red Hand Defenders
1996/12/25	India	Dimapur, Nagaland	car bomb (remote)	Assassination attempt on Kihoto Hollohon. He escaped but his wife and 4 others were killed.	NSCN-IM
1996/11/01	United States	Tucson, Arizona	car bomb (remote)	Gary Triano, Businessman	
1995/08/31	India	Chandigarh	suicide car bomb	Beant Singh, Chief minister of Punjab (with 17 others)	Babbar Khalsa
1992/07/19	Italy	Palermo, Sicily	car bomb (remote)	Paolo Borsellino, Italian judge (with 5 others)	Sicilian Mafia
1992/05/23	Italy	Capaci, Sicily	car bomb (remote)	Giovanni Falcone, Italian judge (with 4 others)	Sicilian Mafia
1991/03/02	Sri Lanka	Colombo	car bomb (remote)	Ranjan Wijeratne, Minister of Foreign Affairs (with 18 others)	LTTE
1990/07/30	United Kingdom	Hankham, England	car bomb (remote)	Ian Gow, Conservative MP	Provisional IRA
1989/12/12	Colombia	Bogotá	car bomb	Assassination attempt on Miguel Maza Márquez. He escaped but 63 others were killed.	Medellín Cartel
1989/11/22	Lebanon	Beirut	car bomb (remote)	Rene Moawad, President of Lebanon (with 23 others)	
1989/05/16	Lebanon	Beirut	car bomb (remote)	Hassan Khaled, Lebanese spiritual leader (with 21 others)	
1988/06/28	Greece	Athens	car bomb (remote)	William Nordeen, United States diplomat	Revolutionary Organization 17 November
1987/12/22	United Kingdom	Lisburn, Northern Ireland	car bomb	John McMichael, Ulster Defence Association leader	Provisional IRA
1987/04/27	United Kingdom	County Armagh, Northern Ireland	car bomb (remote)	Sir Maurice and Lady Gibson	Provisional IRA
1985/05/21	Botswana	Gaborone	car bomb	Vernon Nkadimeng, ANC member	Apartheid secret police
1985/03/08	Lebanon	Beirut	car bomb	Assassination attempt on Mohammad Hussein Fadlallah. He escaped but 80 others were killed.	CIA linked Lebanese counter-terrorism unit
1979/03/30	United Kingdom	Palace of Westminster	car bomb (tilt-based)	Airey Neave, Conservative MP	Irish National Liberation Army
1979/01/22	Lebanon	Beirut	car bomb (remote)	Ali Hassan Salameh, Black September leader (with 8 others)	Mossad
1977/10/18	United States	Evansville, Indiana	car bomb	Ray Ryan, businessman and professional gambler	Chicago Outfit suspected
1976/09/21	United States	Washington, D.C.	unknown	Orlando Letelier, Chilean exile (with one other)	Dirección de Inteligencia Nacional
1976/06/02	United States	Phoenix, Arizona	car bomb (remote)	Don Bolles, investigative reporter	
1975/10/23	United Kingdom	Kensington, London	car bomb	Gordon Fairley, Australian surgeon and oncologist	Provisional IRA
1974/09/30	Argentina	Buenos Aires, Argentina	car bomb (remote)	Carlos Prats, Former Chilean army commander under Salvador Allende Presidency	Dirección de Inteligencia Nacional
1973/12/20	Spain	Madrid	car bomb (remote)	Luis Carrero Blanco, Prime Minister of Spain. See also: Assassination of Luis Carrero Blanco	ETA
1972/02/22	United Kingdom	Aldershot Garrison	car bomb	Gerard Weston, British Roman Catholic priest and military chaplain (with 6 others)	Official IRA
1965/03/30	South Vietnam	Saigon	car bomb	Barbara Robbins, CIA employee (with 21 others)	Viet Cong
1948/03/11	Mandatory Palestine	Jerusalem	car bomb	Leib Yaffe, poet, journalist and editor of Haaretz (with 12 others)	
1928/12/04	United States	Saint Paul, Minnesota	car bomb	"Dapper" Danny Hogan, "Irish Mob" boss	

== See also ==
- List of mass car bombings
