= St. Mary's College, Crosby =

St. Mary's College
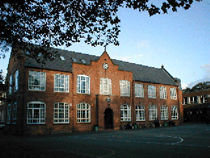

Location
- Everest Road; Crosby; Liverpool, Merseyside, L23 5TW; England; 53°29′18″N 3°01′27″W

Information
- Type: Private day school
- Motto: "Fidem vita fateri" (Latin: Show your faith by the way you live)
- Religious affiliation: Roman Catholic
- Patron saint: Blessed Virgin Mary
- Established: 1919
- Local authority: Sefton
- Chair of Governors: Mrs S Ward
- Principal: Mr M A Kennedy
- Chaplain: Miss A M Engelbrecht
- Staff: 56 (2023)
- Teaching staff: 115 (2023)
- Employees: 171 (2023)
- Gender: Coeducational
- Age range: 0-18
- Enrolment: 824 (2025)
- Colour
- Website: www.stmarys.ac

St. Mary's College is an independent Roman Catholic coeducational day school in Crosby, Merseyside, about seven miles (eleven kilometres) north of Liverpool. It comprises an early years department "Bright Sparks" (age 0–4), preparatory school known as "The Mount" (age 4–11) and secondary school with a Sixth Form (age 11–18). It was formerly a direct grant grammar school for boys, founded and controlled by the Christian Brothers order. Notable alumni include Trent Alexander-Arnold, John Birt, Roger McGough, Tony Booth and Cardinal Vincent Nichols.

== Founding and affiliation ==
The college was established as a boys' school in 1919 by the Irish Christian Brothers, a clerical order founded by Blessed Edmund Rice in the early nineteenth century.

The college became a direct grant grammar school in 1946 as a result of the Education Act 1944. Post-war alumni describe "a heavy emphasis on rote learning and testing, underpinned by the brutal punishment that the Christian Brothers favoured", "the carrot-and-stick method—without the carrot", "a hard, disciplined education ...generous with the strap". "But it wasn't a bad school; they took working-class Catholic boys, gave them an education and got them to university," "the school was good, and still is", and "the sixth form at St. Mary's was an altogether different experience".

When direct grants were abolished by the 1974–79 Labour government, St. Mary's became a private school and is a member of the HMC. It began teaching girls in the sixth form in 1983 and became fully co-educational in 1989. The college is now administered by laypersons, ceasing to be a Christian Brothers' school in January 2006 on becoming an independent charity (St Mary's College Crosby Trust Limited) that "exists to educate children and welcomes families from all faiths".

== Location and buildings ==
St. Mary's College is based in Crosby, a suburb of Liverpool, in the Metropolitan Borough of Sefton. The college originally comprised a mansion, Claremont House, on Liverpool Road, Crosby and the neighbouring property, Everest House, until the purpose-built school was built on Everest Road in 1924. Science blocks were added over the years and an assembly hall in 1978. Claremont House is now occupied by the early years department. The Mount preparatory school is located a short distance away in Blundellsands.

The college has its own gym in the main school building. A sports hall, formerly the Mecca Bingo Hall on Liverpool Road. There are seven laboratories, a D&T workshop and a multi-purpose library and learning centre with computers and additional resources for education. In 2004 a new sixth form centre was built, consisting of a new common room (including a cafe and vending machines) and three computer rooms. Until 1987, the college had a smoking room for the use of sixth form pupils who were smokers.

The Games Field, Blundell Park, is 20 acres (8 hectares) of playing fields nearby on Little Crosby Road; it is used for all year round sporting activities by all three stages of the college. The games field is also used to house the college's Proms in the Park summer concerts, which is described as one of the most ambitious events staged by any school.

== Academics and Extra-curricular ==
=== Academics ===
Exam results consistently exceed national averages achieved by state-funded schools, in 2024, it was ranked as the top performing secondary school in Sefton.

=== Extra-curricular ===
St. Mary's College offers over 40 extra-curricular activities which range from further academic studies, to sport, music and drama.

==== Sport ====
Alongside timetabled sports, pupils have the opportunity to take part in extra sessions of training, which often include coaching by alumni professional athletes as well as external specialists. The sports on offer include:

===== Boys =====
- Winter: Rugby, Football, Cross-Country, Basketball, Hockey, Swimming, Badminton and Fitness
- Summer: Cricket, Tennis, Athletics and Golf

===== Girls =====
- Winter: Netball, Football, Swimming, Dance and Cross-Country
- Summer: Cricket, Athletics, Tennis, Golf and Rounders

==== Music ====
The music department at St. Mary's offers music lessons to all pupils at the college. All pupils also have the opportunity to join either the Junior Band, Lower School Orchestra, or Junior Choir, before progressing to the Symphonic Wind Band, Symphony Orchestra, Stage Band, or Senior Choir, which are the main senior ensembles. There is also a range of smaller ensembles, such as the Pit Band (for drama productions), Trombone Choir, a cappella choirs, and String Quartets. Over 150 pupils from across the Mount and the college sit ABRSM graded exams every year. St. Mary's College musical ensembles perform a minimum of three concerts per academic year. They perform in the St. Mary's College Festival of Music, in the Liverpool Philharmonic Hall, at the annual Prize Giving ceremony in the Liverpool Metropolitan Cathedral, the fireworks extravaganza, Proms in the Park and the Traditional Carol Concert.

==== Combined Cadet Force and Duke of Edinburgh ====
The Combined Cadet Force (CCF) is an opportunity given to pupils in year 9 upwards and aims to develop personal responsibility, leadership and self-discipline in the pupils. The St. Mary's College CCF contingent contains two sections: Army (affiliated to the Parachute Regiment) and RAF (affiliated to RAF Shawbury). Within the CCF, pupils are given the chance to: complete Adventure Training, go Air Experience Flying, complete leadership qualifications, and visit military bases to gain an insight into life in the military. The CCF also encourages the cadets to get involved with externally run camps, courses and awards, such as Junior Cadet Instructor Course, Senior Cadet Instructor Course, Flying and Glider Scholarship, and Lord-Lieutenant's Cadet.

The Duke of Edinburgh's Award is offered to all pupils from year 9 to 13.

==== Drama ====
The drama department provides regular productions, which range from musical theatre productions to Greek tragedies. Most recently, there was the production of Hippolytus, which was performed in the Capstone Theatre in Liverpool. Other productions include: Bugsy Malone, West Side Story, Oliver!, Antigone and Trojan Women.

== The school song ==
The former School Song, composed in the 1920s by music master Frederick R. Boraston (1878–1954) was sung by former pupils, most notably at the annual Speech Day, which were once held at Liverpool's Philharmonic Hall.

== List of Head-teachers and Head-pupils ==
=== Head-teachers ===
- Brother Leahy (1919–1922)
- Brother Duggan (1922–1927)
- Brother McNamara (1927–1930)
- Brother Mulkerrins (1930–1935)
- Brother Crean (1935–1937)
- Brother Delaney (1937–1943)
- Brother Thompson (1943–1949)
- Brother Gibbons (1950–1953)
- Brother Francis (1953–1960)
- Brother Coleman (1960–1966)
- Brother Taylor (1966–1972)
- Brother O'Halloran (1972–1987)
- Brother Ryan (1987–1991)
- Wilfred Hammond (1991–2003)
- Jean Marsh (2003–2008)
- Michael Kennedy (2008–present)

=== Head-pupils ===
The head boy and girl are the highest leadership roles for pupils at St. Mary's College. As the most senior prefects, they are responsible for overseeing the rest of the prefect team, as well as advocating for the school's entire student body. They represent the school at public events by make speeches, while being a role model to all pupils.

== Notable former teachers ==
- Eugene Genin MBE (1903–1983), music teacher, pupil of Arthur Catterall; former lead violist with the RLPO; played in the pre-1933 Philharmonic Hall, Liverpool; remained a teacher at the college until he was almost 80.
- Hugh Rank (1913–2006), Viennese-born Jewish teacher of German literature
- Raymond "Bodge" Boggiano DFC (1920–1985), French master; former Lancaster bomber pilot who took part in the raids on Dresden
- Joe Rigby DFC (1924–2002), Maths teacher; former bomber navigator

== Notable alumni ==
=== Politics and industry ===
- Kevin McNamara KSG (1934-2017) - Labour MP
- John O'Sullivan CBE (b. 1942) - conservative political columnist and pundit; adviser to Prime Minister Margaret Thatcher
- John Birt, Lord Birt (b. 1944) - Director General of the BBC, advisor to the Blair administration
- Phil Kelly (b. 1946) - journalist, editor of Tribune; mayor of Islington
- Michael Carr (1947-1990) - Labour MP
- Sir David Rowlands (1947-2014) - Permanent Secretary, Department for Transport (2003–07); Chairman, Gatwick Airport
- Sir Brendan Barber (b. 1951) - General Secretary of the TUC
- Therese Coffey (b. 1971) - Conservative MP, Deputy Prime Minister of the United Kingdom and Secretary of State for Health and Social Care
- Kevin Morley - businessman, MD of Rover Group
- Eric Nevin - General Secretary NUMAST
- Ray O'Brien CBE - Chief Executive of Nottinghamshire and Merseyside County Councils, Severn Trent Water and FIMBRA
- Mark Gibson, Director Whitehall & Industry Group
- Terry Hughes - corporate financier
- Vincent Nolan - management consultant, Chairman, Synectics UK

=== Diplomats and the law ===
- Ivor Roberts KCMG (b. 1946) - Ambassador to Ireland and Italy; President of Trinity College, Oxford
- Andrew Mitchell CMG - Ambassador to Sweden and Germany

=== Clergy ===
- Father Brian Foley (1919-2000) - Roman Catholic priest and hymnist
- Father Gerard Weston MBE (1933-1972) - Roman Catholic priest, killed by the Official IRA in the 1972 Aldershot bombing
- John Rawsthorne (b. 1936) - Roman Catholic Bishop of Hallam
- Vincent Nichols (b. 1945) - Cardinal Archbishop of Westminster, leader of the Roman Catholics of England and Wales

=== Authors, journalists and broadcasters ===
- John Foley MBE (1917-1974) - military author and broadcaster
- Laurie Taylor (b. 1936) - broadcaster and sociologist, presenter of Thinking Allowed; reputedly the inspiration for Howard Kirk in 1970s novel The History Man
- Roger McGough CBE (b. 1937) - poet, playwright, broadcaster and children's author
- David Crystal OBE (b. 1941) - broadcaster and professor of linguistics
- Danny Kelly (b. 1970) - BBC Radio WM radio presenter
- Nicholas Murray - biographer and novelist, Kafka, Matthew Arnold, Aldous Huxley, Bruce Chatwin
- Will Hanrahan - BBC TV reporter
- Joe Ainsworth - scriptwriter Brookside, Holby City, BAFTA winner
- Sean Curran - journalist and presenter of Radio 4's Today in Parliament

=== Educationists ===
- D.F. Swift - educationist, sociologist

=== Entertainers ===
- Ray McFall (1926-2015) - owner of The Cavern Club, who first booked The Beatles
- Tony Booth (1931-2017) - actor; the "Scouse Git" in Till Death Us Do Part; father-in-law of Tony Blair
- Tom O'Connor (1939-2021) - comedian and former game-show host
- Chris Curtis (1941-2005) - Tony West and John McNally (b. 1941) - members of the 1960s pop group The Searchers
- Dave Lovelady, member of the 60s pop group The Fourmost
- Shaun Fagan, actor (b. 1991) - Boiling Point (2023 TV Series), This City Is Ours, and The Responder Season 2
- Andrew Greenan (b.1960) - operatic bass

=== Artists ===
- James Patten (b. 1946) - composer
- Pete Lyon (b. 1950) - computer graphics games design pioneer
- Trevor Newton (1959-2023) - buildings artist and antique dealer

=== Sportsmen and women ===
- Ralph Rensen (1933-1961) - Grand Prix motorcycle racer was killed in the I.O.M Senior TT on his Norton in 1961.
- Mick Murphy (b. 1945) - rugby league footballer; played for Wales, Bradford Northern and Wagga Wagga.
- Francesca Halsall (b. 1990) - British Olympic Freestyle and Butterfly Swimmer.
- Trent Alexander-Arnold (b. 1998) - footballer, Liverpool F.C.
- Morgan Feeney (b. 1999) – footballer, Shrewsbury Town F.C.
- Faye Kirby (b. 2004) - footballer, Liverpool F.C. Women
- George Newell (b. 1997) - footballer, Bala Town F.C.
- Noah Stephens (b. 2004) rugby league player, St. Helens R.F.C.

=== Others ===
- Frank McLardy (1915-1981) - WW2 traitor, Liverpool District Secretary of the British Union of Fascists; founder member of the Waffen-SS British Free Corps; later served as SS-Unterscharführer in the Waffen-SS Medical Corps. Sentenced to life imprisonment (reduced to 15 years) on his return to England. Served seven years and later emigrated to Germany, where he worked as a pharmacist.

== Alumni association ==
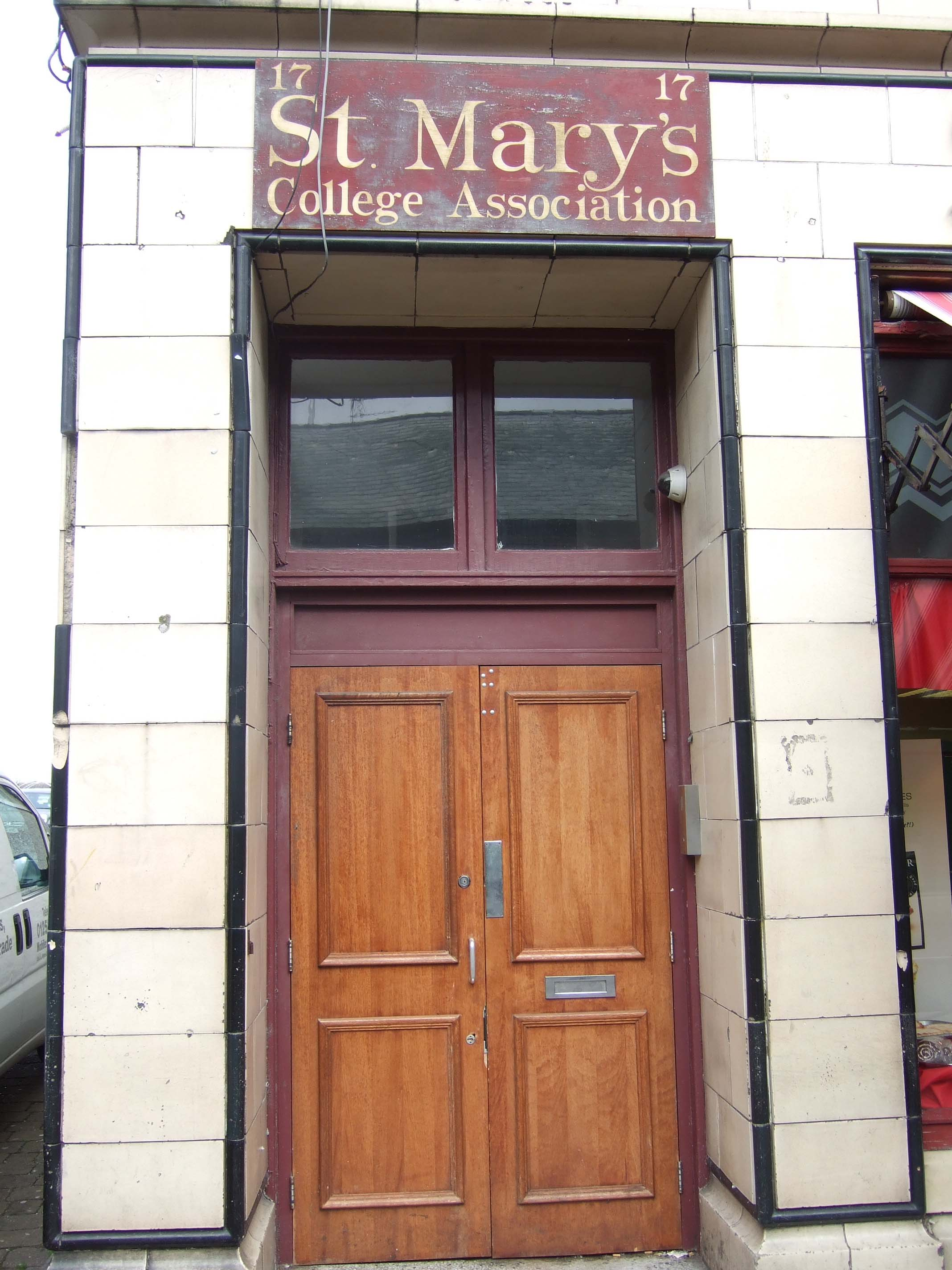
St. Mary's Old Boys' Club pictured shortly after its closure by Sefton Council in April 2010

The college had an alumni association, St. Mary's Old Boys' Club, from 1948 until links were severed due to a scandal and resulting court case, Stringer v. Usher, Smith, Flanagan and Fleming.

The club carried on under the name of St. Mary's Old Boys' Club. A further court case, Stringer v. Smith and Shaw followed in 2000 when the committee attempted to change the club's constitution to allow illegal functions at the club premises. Again the committee capitulated, incurring £3000 in costs. In 2000 and 2004 Merseyside Police raised objections to the continuance of the club on the grounds that it was 'improperly run' and for 'blatant disregard' of the licensing laws. Additionally, the Police did not believe the club was operating as a 'bona fide' members club. In March 2010 St. Mary's Old Boys' Club closed when the police revoked its licence on the grounds that it was not a bona fide club operated in good faith. Simultaneously, the former club trustees found themselves being sued by their landlords for £72,000 of unpaid rent dating back to 2005.
