= Terrorist incidents in Iraq in 2004 =

2004 was most notably marked by a series of battles in Fallujah. See Fallujah during the Iraq War.

== January ==
- January 14: A suicide bomber detonated a bomb outside an Iraqi police station in Baquba. At least three Iraqis are killed and 29 wounded.
- January 18: 18 January 2004 Baghdad bombing - A suicide bomber blew up a Toyota pickup truck packed with 1,000 pounds of explosives outside the headquarters of the US-led coalition, killing 24-31 people, including two American soldiers, and injuring more than 60.
- January 31: A suicide car bombing at the Shahine Hotel in Baghdad killed three people, including a South African security contractor.
- January 31: A suicide car bomber killed nine and wounds 44 at a police station in Mosul.

== February ==
- February 1: 2004 Erbil bombings - At least 105 people are killed and nearly 250 wounded in Erbil when twin suicide bombers blew themselves up at the headquarters of the two leading Kurdish political parties - the Patriotic Union of Kurdistan & the Kurdish Democratic Party. A former government minister, the deputy governor of Erbil Province, and the city's police chief are among those killed.
- February 9: A suicide bomber blew himself up in front of the Ramadi home of Majid and Amer Ali Suleiman, two tribal leaders who had cooperated with US forces. Three of their bodyguards were seriously injured by the blast, but the leaders were unhurt.
- February 10: At least 55 people were killed in a car bombing outside a police station in Iskandariyah, south of Baghdad.
- February 11: Forty-seven Iraqis are killed in a suicide attack outside an army recruitment centre in Baghdad. Ansar al-Islam is blamed.
- February 18: Two suicide bombers attack a Polish military barracks in Hillah, killing 11 Iraqis.
- February 23: Shortly before a visit by US Defence Secretary Donald Rumsfeld, at least ten people were killed by a suicide car bomber targeting a police station in Kirkuk.

== March ==
- March 2: 2004 Ashura massacre - In the deadliest coordinated attacks since the fall of President Saddam Hussein, a series of explosions killed 181 Shiites celebrating the Ashura festival in Baghdad and Karbala. 49 Iranian pilgrims were among the victims of the bombings, at least four of which were suicide attacks.
- March 17: A suicide bomber detonated a car bomb near the Hotel Lebanon in Baghdad, killing 16, including one Briton.
- March 30: A suicide car bomber detonated outside the house of a police chief in Hillah, wounding seven people.
- March 31: 2004 Fallujah ambush

== April ==
- April 21: 21 April 2004 Basra bombings - five suicide car bombers target police stations in and around Basra, killing 74 people including 18 schoolchildren and wounding 160 others.
- April 24: In one of the most extravagant insurgent attacks to date, three suicide boats targeted the al-Basra oil terminal, seven miles off the southern coast of Iraq. Three US sailors were killed after they attempted to board one of the insurgent dhows, and oil exports from al-Basra were shut down for at least one day, costing Iraq one million barrels in lost exports.

== May ==
- May 6: Six people, including one US soldier, were killed when a suicide car bomb exploded at a checkpoint outside the Green Zone.
- May 7: Killing of Nick Berg
- May 17: A suicide car bomber killed Izzadine Saleem, the head of the Iraqi Governing Council, as his car waited at a checkpoint outside the Green Zone in Baghdad. Up to seven other people were killed.
- May 22: Another senior Iraqi official was the target of a suicide car bomb which killed at least four people and wounded deputy interior minister Abdul-Jabar Youssef al-Sheikhli at his home in Baghdad.

== June ==
- June 1: A suicide car bomb attack at a checkpoint near a US Army base in Baiji killed at least ten Iraqis.
- June 8: A suicide car bomber hit a US outpost at the former al-Faris air force base in Baquba, killing four Iraqis and one US soldier, and injuring 16 Iraqis and ten US soldiers. In Mosul, an orange and white taxi with three suicide bombers on board detonated outside the mayor's office, killing ten people.
- June 13: Four police officers and eight civilians were killed when a suicide car bomber struck a police post in southern Baghdad.
- June 14: A suicide bombing in Baghdad killed 13 people, including two Britons, a Filipino, a Frenchman, and an American.
- June 18: June 2004 Baghdad bombing - A suicide car bomber driving a white 4x4 detonated his vehicle amongst a crowd of 300 unemployed young men queuing at the gates of an Iraqi army base in central Baghdad. 35 people were killed and 138 injured.
- June 24: A suicide bomber attacked a checkpoint in Baghdad, killing four Iraqi soldiers. The attack came a week before the scheduled handover of power from the US government to the Iraqi Interim Government.

== July ==
- July 6: A suicide car bomber targeted a funeral tent in Al Khalis, killing 13 people and wounding at least 37 others.
- July 14: A suicide car bomber killed at least nine people and wounded 40 others at a checkpoint next to the British Embassy in Baghdad.
- July 17: Five people were killed and eight others injured when a suicide car bomb rammed into a convoy carrying Iraqi Justice Minister, Malik Dohan al-Hassan, in Baghdad. Al-Hassan managed to escape the attack, but three of his bodyguards and two civilian bystanders were killed. uncertain number of suicide attacks on this day
- July 19: Nine people were killed and at least 60 others injured when a large fuel tanker, rigged as a car bomb, exploded as it drove toward a police station in the Seidiyeh neighbourhood of Baghdad.
- July 20: A suicide truck bomb blew up outside a Baghdad police station, killing at least nine Iraqis and injuring more than 60 others.
- July 28: 2004 Baqubah bombing - A suicide car bomb exploded outside a police recruiting centre in central Baqubah, killing 68 Iraqis.

== August ==
- August 1: A suicide car bomb went off outside a police station in Iraq's northern city of Mosul, killing four people and wounding 34.
- August 5: A suspected suicide car bombing outside a police station in Southern Baghdad killed four people and injured twenty-one.
- August 28: A suicide car bomber detonated after attempting to block the path of A Kurdish media team's car when they reached a checkpoint between Erbil and Mosul. No-one apart from the bomber was hurt.

== September ==
- September 4: A suicide car bomb exploded in front of an Iraqi Police Academy in Kirkuk, killing at least 21 people.
- September 6: A suicide car bombing in Fallujah killed seven U.S. Marines and three Iraqi Guardsmen.
- September 12 2004 The Haifa Street helicopter incident or the Haifa Street massacre was a controversial event in Baghdad, Iraq, on September 12, 2004. The fighting started before dawn on Haifa Street, where insurgents detonated two car bombs and attacked American troops with heavy gunfire. An American Bradley armored fighting vehicle was mobilized to support US troops, but it was struck by a car bomb around 6:30 a.m., wounding four American soldiers.
- September 14: 14 September 2004 Baghdad bombing - A suicide car bomber killed 47 people outside a police station on Haifa Street in Baghdad, where a crowd of volunteers and recruits were waiting to sign up. A suicide car bomber exploded by a convoy of civilian contractors in Baghdad, hurting no-one but himself.
- September 17: A suicide car bomb detonated near an Iraqi police checkpoint on al-Rashid Street in central Baghdad, killing at least eight Iraqis and wounding 41 others. Another vehicle-borne explosive device detonated on Haifa Street in Baghdad when US forces opened fire on it. The vehicle was attempting to breach a security perimeter, and both of its occupants were killed in the ensuing explosion.
- September 18: A suicide car bomb detonated in front of the Iraqi national guard headquarters in the northern city of Kirkuk, killing 19 people and wounding 67 others, including guardsmen and recruits.
- September 20: A car bomb detonated in Mosul, killing all three people in the car and one bystander. Authorities believe that the victims were insurgents who were planning to carry out a suicide attack in the area, when their bomb detonated prematurely.
- September 22: A suicide car bomber killed 11 people and wounded up to 54 outside a photocopy shop in Baghdad, where Iraqi National Guard applicants were preparing their papers. Another suicide car bomb struck US military vehicles in the upmarket Mansour district of the capital, injuring four US soldiers and two civilians. One US military death was later attributed to these bombings.
- September 30: 30 September 2004 Baghdad bombing - Up to two suicide bombers targeted US troops as they handed out sweets to Iraqi children in Baghdad, killing 42 and wounded 141. Of the dead 35 were children, while the wounded included 10 US soldiers & 72 children under the age of 14. Hours earlier a suicide blast in the Abu Ghraib area killed between three and nine people, including one US soldier.

== October ==
- October 4: Ten people were killed when a suicide car bomber rammed an entrance to the Green Zone in Baghdad, close to where recruits were lining up to join Iraq's security forces. Seventy others were wounded. A car bomb in Mosul detonated with two people on board, killing the occupants and five others, though it was not clear if the attack was a deliberate suicide mission.
- October 6: A suicide car bomber killed at least 16 people at an Iraqi National Guard centre near the Syrian border.
- October 10: A suicide attacker detonated explosives packed on a minibus near a police academy in eastern Baghdad, killing 10 to 17 people. Another suicide car bomb in the capital struck a military convoy near the Culture Ministry, killing one US soldier.
- October 14: A pair of suicide bombers succeeded in penetrating the Green Zone in Baghdad. The twin blasts killed at least six people, including three or four Americans.
- October 15: A suicide car bomb blew up in an Iraqi Police contingent in main street in al-Dawrah, south Baghdad. Five police officers were killed, and nine policemen injured.
- October 17: A suicide car bomb detonated on a bridge in the northern city of Mosul, killing five Iraqis and wounding 15 others. A suicide car bomb detonated outside a Baghdad cafe popular with Iraqi police and near to the Australian embassy, killing seven and wounding more than 20.
- October 23: At least 16 Iraqi policemen were killed and 40 others were wounded when a suicide driver detonated his car at a police station near a US Marine base in Khan al-Baghdadi, 140 miles west of the capital. A second suicide driver killed four guardsmen and injured six others in an attack near an Iraqi National Guard checkpoint in Ishaqi, 6 miles south of Samarra.
- October 25: Two suicide car bombs detonated in Mosul, killing at least three Iraqis and wounding at least nine government employees. A suicide car bomber attacked a US convoy in Khaldiya, destroying at least two Humvees and causing an unknown number of US casualties.

== November ==
- November 3: A suicide car bombing at a checkpoint on the Baghdad Airport Road killed at least one British security contractor. Up to nine airline employees were also injured.
- November 4: Three Scottish Black Watch soldiers and an Iraqi translator were killed by a suicide bomber near Camp Dogwood, outside of Baghdad. A suicide bomber blew up a car in front of the municipal council building in Tikrit, wounding ten.
- November 6: Four car bombs in Samarra targeted local police forces, killing about 40 people. At least two of the blasts are detonated by suicide bombers.
- November 7: Two bomb disposal experts from the Royal Signals and Royal Logistics Corps were seriously injured by a suicide car bomb. The explosion blew the legs off one of the men and caused serious limb injuries to the other.
- November 8: Near simultaneous suicide car bomb attacks on St. Matthews Catholic Church and St. Georges Catholic Church in Baghdad killed at least three people and wounded over 40.
- November 11: At least 18 people were killed and 15 wounded when a suicide car bomber targeted a vehicle carrying Americans in a central Baghdad market during rush hour.
- November 13: A suicide bomber exploded near an Iraqi police patrol in the center of Hillah, wounding four policemen.
- November 19: A suicide bomber exploded his vehicle near an Iraqi police patrol in Baghdad, injuring up to 11 people and killing one policeman.
- November 26: According to Al-Diyar Television, a suicide bomber blew up his car near the 14 July suspension bridge in Baghdad, causing an unknown number of casualties.
- November 29: A suicide bomber drove his vehicle into a group of policemen waiting to collect their salaries in western Ramadi. Twelve people were killed and ten wounded.

== December ==
- December 3: A van with four suicide bombers on board drove into a Shi'ite mosque in Baghdad, killing 14 civilians who had gathered for morning prayers. A police station within the compound of the Ministry of Housing and Construction was attacked with a suicide car bomb, wounding an unknown number of people.
- December 4: A suicide bomber drove into a bus carrying Kurdish Peshmerga fighters in the northern city of Mosul, killing 16. A suicide bomber targeted a police station just outside the main entrance to the Green Zone in Baghdad, killing seven and injuring 50.
- December 5: A suicide car bomber drove into a convoy of National Guardsmen in Baiji, killing the local commander, Mohammad Jassim Rumaied, along with three bodyguards.
- December 8: A suicide bomber attacked a US convoy in Samarra, killing three Iraqis.
- December 13: A suicide car bomber kills 13 while in line at a checkpoint at the Western Gate of Baghdad's Green Zone.
- December 14: A suicide car bomber strikes the same Green Zone checkpoint that was hit 24 hours earlier, killing at least six people and wounding 13.
- December 19: A suicide bomber in Najaf killed at least 51 people when he targeted a funeral procession near the Imam Ali shrine. A suicide car bomb near a bus stop in Karbala killed at least 14 people. It occurred near the twin shrines of Hussein and Abbas, and also near the home of Grand Ayatollah Ali al-Sistani. Zarqawi's group al-Qaeda in Iraq claimed that the group was not responsible for these attacks.
- December 21: 2004 Forward Operating Base Marez bombing - A suicide bomber infiltrated Mosul's Marez Base and detonated his vest amongst a crowd of US soldiers sitting down for lunch. Twenty two people were killed, including nineteen American soldiers and three military contractor. The Ansar al-Sunnah Army claimed responsibility.
- December 22: A suicide car bomber attacked a U.S. convoy in Al Anbar province, seriously wounding six U.S. Marines, including Tyler Ziegel.
- December 23: According to Al-Sharqiyah Television, a suicide bomber detonated his vehicle during rush hour at a checkpoint in the al-Latifiyah area, killing five people and wounding 13.
- December 24: A fuel tanker driven by a suicide bomber exploded in the Mansour district of Baghdad near the Libyan and Jordanian embassies. The explosion killed at least eight people, including guards at the Libyan embassy, and injured 19.
- December 27: A suicide bomber detonated his vehicle outside the home of Abdul Aziz al-Hakim, the head of SCIRI. Thirteen people were killed and about 50 injured, but Hakim escaped unharmed.
- December 28: A suicide bomber detonated his bomb in the center of Samarra, wounding ten people. The target of the blast was unclear.
- December 29: 28 people, including 10 Iraqi policemen, died in Baghdad in a huge explosion at a suspected militant safe-house. US army experts estimate that up to 1,800lb of explosives have been detonated.
