= Mohmand offensive =

Pakistani Military offensive against terrorists near the Afghan border

Mohmand Offensive
- Part of the Insurgency in Khyber Pakhtunkhwa
- Mohmand Agency is the yellow colored region
Date	3 November 2009 – 20 December 2012 (3 years, 1 month, 2 weeks and 3 days)
Location	Mohmand Agency, Federally Administered Tribal Areas, Pakistan
Result	Pakistani victory

Belligerents
Pakistan	Tehrik-i-Taliban

Commanders and leaders
LGen Masood Aslam	Maulana Fazlullah

Units involved
Pakistan Armed Forces; Pakistan Army; XI Corps; LCBs; SSG; Pakistan Air Force; Civil Armed Forces; FCKP(N)	Unknown

The Mohmand Offensive also known as Operation Brekhna (English: Operation Thunder) was a Pakistani military operation against the Tehrik-i-Taliban in the Mohmand Agency area of the Federally Administered Tribal Areas that began in 2009.

== Start of Offensive ==
In late 2009 the Pakistani military had been engaged in a campaign to clear criminals and terrorists from the Mohmand Agency, with the commander of forces in the area claiming that 80 percent of the area had been cleared as of September 2009. The area, which borders Kunar Province, Afghanistan, had been the scene of violence prior to the attack as a result of spillover from neighbouring Afghanistan and other areas of Pakistan.

== Timeline ==
=== 2010 ===
9 July. Main Article Mohmand Agency attack.
2 November. The Taliban fighters blew up a school for girls in Mohmand Agency.
3 November. At least 17 Pakistani Taliban insurgents were killed and 10 others injured, when the Pakistan Army, targeted and destroyed several militant hide-outs.
9 November. The Taliban fighters blew up a three school in Mohmand Agency.
14 November. At least 1 Pakistani soldier was killed after a landmine struck a Pakistan Army military vehicle within the Mohmand Agency, of north-western Pakistan.
15 November. The Taliban fighters blew up a primary school in Mohmand Agency. Since 2007, 67 schools were burned.
16 November. At least 6 Pakistani Taliban insurgents were killed and 19 others injured, when Pakistani Army helicopter gunships, targeted and destroyed militant positions within the Mohmand Agency, of north-western Pakistan.
6 December. Main Article December 2010 Mohmand Agency bombings.
11 December. At least 4 Pakistani Taliban insurgents were killed and 3 others injured, after insurgents were repelled in a checkpoint attack within the Mohmand Agency, of north-western Pakistan.
14 December. At least 2 Pakistani soldiers were killed and 6 others injured, after Pakistani Taliban insurgents launched an overnight attack on a security post within the Mohmand Agency, of north-western Pakistan.
23 December. At least 1 Pakistani citizen were killed and 3 others injured by a roadside bomb in Mohmand Agency.
24 December. At least 11 Pakistani soldiers and 24 Pakistani Taliban insurgents were killed, after some 150 insurgents launched a series of militant attacks against five Frontier Corps checkpoints within the Mohmand Agency, of north-western Pakistan.

=== 2011 ===
5 January. A least 39 Taliban insurgents were arrested by Pakistani army forces in Mohmand Agency.
15 January. At least 3 Pakistani citizen were killed and 1 other injured by a bomb explosion in Mohmand Agency.
20 February. At least 100 Taliban insurgents were killed in the past month in the Mohmand Аgency.

19 June. 25 insurgents were reported killed in the Baizai area, according to a report by Pajhwok Afghan News.

=== 2012 ===
20 December. 28 students were killed when a Mohmand Model school bus was blown up by a suicide bomber at Shaki Khel village Mohmand agency, a tribal area in Pakistan. There were 40 students along with their 2 teachers and a bus driver in this unfortunate bus, the remaining injured were shifted to LRH hospital for treatment. The attack was claimed by the TTP as they stated that the children were involved in a form of education which was "against sharia" (the Islamic code of life).

== See also ==
- Orakzai and Kurram offensive
- Insurgency in Khyber Pakhtunkhwa
- Federally Administered Tribal Areas
- Khyber Pakthunkhwa
