= Terrorist incidents in Iraq in 2006 =

2006 marked the onset of a sectarian war in Iraq and was the deadliest year of the Iraq War since the 2003 U.S. invasion of Iraq.

== January 2006 ==
- January 1: Two suicide car bombs kill one Iraqi soldier and wound 24 others north of Baghdad.
- January 2: A suicide bomber kills seven people on a bus in Baquba.
- January 4: A suicide bomber strikes a Shiite funeral, killing 32 and wounding 40.
- January 5: A suicide bomber in Kerbala detonates an explosive belt laced with ball bearings and a grenade, killing 51 and wounding 138. A suicide bomber in Ramadi attacks near a group of police and army recruits, killing more than 60 and wounding around 70. Two other suicide car bombs explode in Baghdad.
- January 6: A suicide bomber targets an Interior Ministry patrol, killing one policeman and wounding seven others.
- January 9: Two suicide bombers disguised as police infiltrate the heavily fortified Interior Ministry compound in Baghdad and blow themselves up, killing 29.
- January 20: A suicide car bomber kills two U.S. soldiers in Haqlaniyah.
- January 23: A suicide bomber kills three people and injures seven others near the Iranian embassy in Baghdad.

== February 2006 ==
- February 14: A suicide car bomber kills two U.S. Marines near al-Qa'im.
- February 22: The Al-Askari Mosque is bombed; the U.S. and Iraq blame the attack on al Qaeda, leading to civil war.

== March 2006 ==
- March 10: A suicide truck bomber kills eight and wounds 11 at a checkpoint in Falluja.
- March 14: A suicide bombing in Northern Iraq kills at least one person: American security contractor Chaz Benjamin Crawford.
- March 27: A suicide bomber kills 30 to 40 people at a security forces recruitment center in northern Iraq
- March 29: Two suicide bombers on a minibus filled with explosives attempt to attack a police station in Haswa, south of Baghdad, but the bus explodes prematurely when police open fire on it, wounding 11 policemen and a female bystander.
- March 30: A suicide car bomber rams a police convoy in west Baghdad’s Yarmouk neighborhood, killing one police commando and wounding three others. Two civilians were also hurt.

== April 2006 ==
- April 3: A suicide truck bomb attack near a Shiite mosque in northeastern Baghdad kills 10 and wounds 38.
- April 7: Two or three suicide bombers target the Baratha mosque in Baghdad, killing 85 people and wounding 160.
- April 11: A suicide bomber kills an American soldier in Rawah, Al Anbar province.
- April 17: A suicide bomber attacks a market in the town of Mahmudiya, killing at least 13 people and wounding 19. Two or three suicide car bombers target the Government Center in Ramadi, wounding one U.S. Marine.

== May 2006 ==
- May 1: A suicide bomber attacks a US army patrol, killing one Iraqi civilian and wounding two others in Iskandariya, south of Baghdad.
- May 2: A suicide bomber explodes near a convoy carrying the governor of Anbar in central Ramadi, killing 10 and injuring six.
- May 3: A suicide bomber kills 16 and wounds 25 at a police recruitment center in Falluja. One U.S. soldier dies in Tammin, Al Anbar province when a suicide bomber in a vehicle attacks near his observation post during dismounted combat patrol operations.
- May 4: A female suicide bomber attacks a crowd of police officers and civilians outside the civil court building in Baghdad, killing at least nine.
- May 6: A suicide bomber kills three Iraqi soldiers at a base in Tikrit.
- May 7: A suicide bomber kills five and wounds 18 in Karbala. A suicide bomber attacks an Iraqi army patrol as it left a base in the Azamiyah neighborhood in Baghdad, killing 10 and wounding 15.
- May 9: A suicide car bombing kills 22 and wounds 134 in Tal Afar.
- May 14: A double suicide car bomb attack occurs outside the Baghdad airport, near the Victory Base checkpoint, killing 14 and wounding six.
- May 20: A suicide car bomber attacks a police station in Al-Qaim, killing five and wounding 10. Victims were both civilians and policemen.
- May 21: A suicide bomber kills 13 and wounds 18 in a restaurant in central Baghdad.
- May 29: A U.S. soldier, CBS News cameraman Paul Douglas, and soundman James Brolan are killed in a possible suicide car bombing attack in Baghdad's Karrada district. A suicide car bomber attacks a police patrol in Baghdad, wounding two police and killing one.
- May 30: A suicide bomber kills at least 12 people and wounded 36 in Hilla.

== June 2006 ==
- June 3: A suicide bomber attacks a market in Basra, killing 28 people and wounding 62.
- June 12: A suicide bomber attacks a gas station in Tal Afar, killing four civilians and wounding over 40.
- June 13: As many as five suicide attacks hit Kirkuk. In the central Quraya neighbourhood, a suicide car bomber strikes the house of a senior police officer, Colonel Taher Salah al-Din, seriously wounding him and killing one of his bodyguards. Shortly afterward, guards shoot a suicide bomber in a car as he tries to attack Kirkuk's police headquarters. He blows himself up, killing two policemen. Across town, a suicide car bomber attacks outside the offices of the Patriotic Union of Kurdistan, wounding two. A second suicide car bomber targets the same building, but guards shoot and kill him before he attacks. Another suicide bomber strikes a security building in the Wasit neighbourhood, wounding four civilians.
- June 14: Police shoot and kill a suicide bomber as he tries to attack a police checkpoint in Kirkuk.
- June 16: A suicide bomber slips into a Shiite mosque in Baghdad, killing 11 and wounding 25 during Friday prayers.
- June 17: A suicide bomber detonates his vehicle near a police checkpoint in Mahmudiya, killing four and injuring 15.
- June 19: A suicide bomber kills four civilians and wounds 10 in an attack on an Iraqi army checkpoint in central Baghdad.
- June 20: A suicide bomber kills two and injures two in a senior citizens home in Basra.
- June 24: A suicide bomber in Dhuluyia kills five Iraqi policemen.
- June 25: A suicide bomber kills a police commando and wounds nine people in an attack on a police checkpoint in Baghdad's.
- June 26: A suicide bomber kills two Iraqi police commandos and injures four people at a military checkpoint in western Baghdad.
- June 27: A suicide bomber attacks a gas station in Kirkuk, killing at least three people and wounding 17.
- June 28: A suicide car bomber attacks a Sunni mosque near a market in Baqubah, killing three people.
- June 29: A suicide car bomber kills five and wounds at least 31 during a wake for an Iraqi soldier in Kirkuk.

== July 2006 ==
- July 1: A suicide car bombing kills 62 and wounds 114 at a crowded market in Sadr City, a Shi'ite district of Baghdad. A group called The Supporters of the Sunni People claims responsibility for the attack. Another suicide bomber kills two policemen and wounds six people in an attack on a police patrol in Mosul.
- July 3: A suicide car bomber attacks a security patrol in Baghdad, wounding two policemen, two soldiers, and one civilian.
- July 5: A suicide car bomber attacks a police checkpoint in Mosul, killing two people, including a policeman.
- July 6: A suicide bomber attacks two buses carrying Iranian pilgrims outside a Shi'ite shrine in Kufa, killing 12 and wounding 41. Eight killed were Iranians.
- July 10: A suicide bomber attacks the offices of the PUK party in Kirkuk, killing three and wounding eight. A suicide bomber attacks a crowd of civilians gathered at the site of an earlier explosion in Sadr City, killing eight and wounding 41 people.
- July 11: More than 50 people are killed in Baghdad in violence that includes a double suicide bombing near busy entrances to the fortified Green Zone.
- July 12: A suicide bomber attacks a restaurant in southern Baghdad, killing seven and injuring 20.
- July 13: A suicide bomber attacks a police patrol in Kirkuk, killing three people and wounding eight. A suicide bomber attacks the city council of Abi Saida, north of Baghdad, killing six people and wounding three, including the head of the city council. A suicide car bomber attacks a police patrol in Mosul, killing two policemen and three civilians and wounding five, including two policemen.
- July 14: A suicide bomber attacks a police patrol in Mosul, killing five people, including three civilians.
- July 15: A suicide bomber attacks a police commando checkpoint in eastern Baghdad, killing two policeman and wounding four. A suicide car bomb targets a police patrol in Baghdad, wounding six people, including two policemen.
- July 16: A suicide bomber strikes a cafe in Tuz Khurmatu, killing 28 people.
- July 18: A suicide car bomb kills 53–59 people and injures more than 100 at a market in Kufa. A suicide bomber attacks an Iraqi army patrol in Mosul, killing four people and wounding two.
- July 21: A suicide bomber kills six policemen and wounds 13 others near Falluja. A suicide bomber breaks into the home of As'ad Ali Yasin, the head of the Samarra local council, and kills himself but does not harm Yasin or anyone else.
- July 23: A suicide bomber driving a minibus near a market in Sadr City kills 32–34 and injures 65–70.
- July 24: A suicide bomber kills five Iraqi soldiers and wounds four in an attack on their patrol in Mosul. A suicide bomber attacks a Samarra Emergency Battalion checkpoint, killing a civilian and wounding six policemen.
- July 25: A suicide bomber attacks a house used by Iraqi police in Samarra, killing one person and wounding seven others.
- July 29: A suicide bomber attacks a police checkpoint near Qaim, wounding two policemen.
- July 30: A suicide car bomber attacks a police patrol in Mosul, killing a policeman and wounding three other officers.
- July 31: A suicide bomber attacks an Iraqi observation post outside Mosul, killing four soldiers and wounding six.

== August 2006 ==
- August 1: A suicide car bomber kills at least 10 soldiers and four civilians and wounds 22 others near an Iraqi army convoy in central Baghdad.
- August 4: A suicide bomber in a pickup truck kills 10 and wounds 12 in an athletic field in Hadhar.
- August 6: A suicide bomber attacks a funeral in central Tikrit, killing 15 people and injuring 17.
- August 7: A suicide truck bomber kills nine soldiers and injures 10 civilians in Samarra.
- August 10: A suicide bomber kills 35 and injures 122 at a checkpoint near a shrine in Najaf.
- August 13: Insurgents use a rocket, a car bomb, a suicide bomber on a motorcycle and two other devices to attack the Zafaraniya neighbourhood of southeastern Baghdad over the course of an hour. 57 people are killed and almost 150 are wounded.
- August 15: A suicide truck bomber kills nine people and wounds 36 outside the PUK headquarters in Mosul.
- August 19: A suicide car bomber attacks a Shiite mosque in Baghdad's Doura district, killing one person.
- August 23: A suicide bomber attacks police headquarters in Mosul, killing one person and wounding 10. A suicide bomber disguised as a policeman wounds six policemen in an attack on a police station.
- August 27: A suicide truck bomber kills two Kurdish guards and wounds 16 people in an attack on the PUK party offices. A double suicide car bombing in Kirkuk near the home of Peyrut Talabani, a cousin of then-President Jalal Talabani, kills nine people and wounds 22.
- August 28: A suicide car bomber attacks a compound of the Iraqi Interior Ministry in Baghdad, killing 16 people, including 13 policemen, and injuring dozens. The Baghdad bomber struck as UK Defence Minister Des Browne was in the capital for talks with Iraqi officials. A suicide car bomber attacks a line of cars waiting for fuel at a gas station in the Dora district of Baghdad, killing three people and wounding 15.
- August 29: A suicide car bombing kills at least one person: American interpreter Saher Georges.
- August 31: A suicide bomber attacks a gas station in eastern Baghdad, killing two people and wounding 13.

== September 2006 ==
- September 3: A suicide bomber kills two policemen and wounds three others at a police patrol in Mosul.
- September 7: A suicide bomber kills 12 policemen at a police fuel depot in Baghdad. A suicide bomber attacks a police patrol in a tunnel in the Bab al-Sharji district of Baghdad, killing three people and wounding 10.
- September 9: A suicide bomber kills one policeman and wounds 10 civilians after police at Baghdad's Adhamiya police station fire at the bomber's car and it detonates prematurely.
- September 10: A suicide car bomber attacks a police raiding party, killing three people and wounding 14, mostly policemen.
- September 11: A suicide bomber attacks a bus full of army recruits in Baghdad, killing 16 people and wounding seven.
- September 14: A suicide truck bomb hits a U.S. Army outpost in Baghdad, killing three U.S. soldiers and wounding 25 others. A suicide bomber attacks an Iraqi police checkpoint in Tal Afar, killing one officer and wounding two others.
- September 16: A suicide bomber kills four civilians at a U.S. patrol in Ramadi. A suicide bomber kills one civilian and wounds 22 others at a well-fortified police station in Baghdad's Doura district.
- September 17: A suicide car bomber attacks a police checkpoint in Kirkuk, killing only himself.
- September 18: A suicide bomber kills 13 people and wounds 10 at a police recruitment center in Ramadi. A suicide bomber kills at least 21 people and wounds 17 at a Tal Afar market.
- September 19: A suicide bomber attacks a crowd of people gathered at the scene of an earlier bomb attack on an army base in Al-Shirqat. At least 21 people are killed and 50 are wounded. A suicide car bomber strikes a U.S. army vehicle in Mosul, killing one soldier and wounding two others.
- September 20: A suicide bomber attacks the house of Khalid al-Fulalli, a Sunni leader of the Bazi tribe, in Samarra, killing one child and wounding 26 people. A suicide truck bomber kills seven police commandos and wounds 11 others, including three civilians, at a police checkpoint in the Doura district of Baghdad. A suicide bomber kills at least 22 people and wounds 24 at a Tal Afar market.
- September 24: A suicide bomber kills two Iraqi soldiers and wounds three others, including a civilian, at a checkpoint in Tal Afar.
- September 25: A suicide bomber kills seven policemen and wounds seven others a police checkpoint in Ramadi.
- September 26: A suicide bomber kills two policemen and wounds four policemen and eight U.S. soldiers at a police station in Jurf al-Sakhar.
- September 27: A suicide bomber kills five people and wounds fifteen at the Iraqi Communist Party's headquarters in Baghdad.
- September 28: A suicide bomber kills one policeman and wounds eight at a checkpoint near the U.S. military base at the Kirkuk airport. A suicide bomber kills two civilians and wounds 25, including nine soldiers, at an Iraqi army headquarters in the Shaab district of Baghdad.
- September 30: A suicide bomber kills two people and wounds 30 at an Iraqi army checkpoint in Tal Afar.

== October 2006 ==
- October 3: A suicide bomber kills three and wounds 19 at a fish market in Baghdad.
- October 4: A suicide car bomber wounds three policemen, two soldiers, and nine civilians at an Iraqi police and army checkpoint in Tal Afar. A suicide truck bomber kills only himself but wounds others outside the Iraqi army headquarters in Ramadi. A car bomber rams his vehicle into the entrance of a police station in Ramadi and wounds four.
- October 7: A suicide car bomb kills 14 people, including four soldiers, and wounds 13, including nine civilians, at an Iraqi Army checkpoint in Tal Afar.
- October 9: A suicide car bomber kills a policeman and wounds a policeman and 10 civilians at a police checkpoint in Tal Afar. A suicide car bomber wounds officers and commandos at a police checkpoint in Trebil, near the Jordanian border.
- October 12: A suicide bomber wounds a soldier at an Iraqi Army checkpoint in Kirkuk. A suicide bomber attacks the army headquarters in Ramadi, but there are no casualties.
- October 13: A suicide bomber kills three Iraqi soldiers at a patrol in Mazraa.
- October 15: Suicide bombers attack at least six targets in Kirkuk, killing 18 people and wounding over 70 others. A suicide bomber in Tal Afar kills five people, including three policemen. A suicide bomber kills eight people at a market in Al Qaim.
- October 17: A suicide car bomber targets police commandos, killing two police and wounding nine, including four civilians, in Baghdad's southern Saidiya district. A suicide car bomber kills a soldier and wounds two others at an Iraqi army checkpoint in Shirqat. Two suicide bombers attack the police academy in Kirkuk; there are no casualties.
- October 19: A suicide car bomber kills two Iraqi soldiers and wounds four more near Kirkuk. Six suicide bombers in vehicles attack Iraqi police and U.S. patrols in Mosul, killing at least 20 people. A suicide car bomber kills at least eight people and wounds 70 others in Kirkuk.
- October 21: A suicide bomber kills five passengers and wounds 15 others on a bus in Baghdad.
- October 22: A suicide bomber kills six people and wounds 20 in central Baghdad.
- October 25: A suicide bomber kills two policemen at a hospital in Baquba.
- October 26: A suicide bomber wounds two Iraqi soldiers in Tal Afar.
- October 30: A suicide attacker kills two policemen and a three-year-old girl and wounds 19, including 10 policemen, inside police headquarters in Kirkuk. A double suicide attack kills six soldiers and wounds one at an Iraqi army checkpoint at a border pass near Syria.

== November 2006 ==
- November 1: Two suicide car bomb attacks on police positions north of Ramadi kill five policemen and wound three.
- November 7: A suicide bomber kills 17 people and wounds 20 in a cafe in the Shi'ite Greyat district.
- November 10: A suicide car bomber kills a colonel and four soldiers and wounds 17 people, including 10 soldiers, at an army checkpoint in Tal Afar.
- November 11: A suicide car bomber kills two people at a police station north of Baquba.
- November 12: A suicide bomber kills 35 people and wounds 58 at a police recruiting center in Baghdad.
- November 18: A suicide car bomb kills one policeman and wounds another at a police checkpoint in Haditha.
- November 19: A suicide car bomb near a funeral procession kills three people and wounds 22 in Kirkuk.
- November 20: A suicide car bomber kills two people, including one policeman, and wounds six others, including four policemen, near a police checkpoint in Ramadi. A suicide car bomber kills three soldiers and wounds four others, including a policeman, at a joint Iraqi police-army patrol west of Mosul.
- November 23: Mortar rounds and five car bombs, at least three of which were suicide attacks, kill 215 in Sadr City.
- November 24: A double suicide attack kills 22 people and wounds 45 at a market in a Shi'ite district in Tal Afar.
- November 29: A suicide car bomber kills one civilian and wounds 23 at a police station in Mosul. A suicide car bomber kills a policeman and wounds seven people, including three policemen, at a police patrol in southwestern Baghdad. A suicide car bomber kills a policeman and wounds five civilians near a police patrol in central Baghdad.

== December 2006 ==
- December 1: A suicide bomber kills two civilians at a U.S. patrol in Kirkuk.
- December 3: A suicide bomber kills two people at a police patrol in Mosul. A suicide bomber kills three policemen at a convoy near Kirkuk.
- December 6: A suicide bomber kills three people on a minibus in Baghdad.
- December 9: A suicide bomber kills seven people at a market in Karbala.
- December 11: A suicide bomber kills one police commando in Baghdad.
- December 12: A suicide bomber strikes a crowd of mostly poor Shiites in Baghdad, killing at least 71 people and wounding 220. A suicide bomber kills one person at a police checkpoint in Baghdad.
- December 13: A double suicide kills seven soldiers and wounds 15 at an Iraqi army base near Kirkuk. A double suicide attack kills four soldiers and wounds 10 at the headquarters of the Iraqi army's 2nd Battalion near Kirkuk.
- December 20: A suicide car bomber kills 11 people at a police checkpoint in Baghdad.
- December 21: A suicide bomber kills three police officers and 12 recruits at a police recruitment center in Baghdad. A suicide bomber kills one soldier at an Iraqi army checkpoint near Kirkuk. A suicide bomber kills two people in Baghdad.
- December 24: A suicide bomber kills at least seven police officers and wounds 30 at a police station in Muqdadiya.
- December 25: A suicide bomber kills three people and wounds 20 others on a crowded bus in the Shi'ite Talibiya district in northeastern Baghdad. A suicide bomber kills three policemen and wounds two students at a police checkpoint near the entrance of the University of Anbar in Ramadi.
- December 28: A suicide bomber uses a minibus to kill two people and wound 19 at the KDP offices in Mosul.
- December 29: A suicide bomber kills 10 people at a Shi'ite mosque in Khalis.
- December 30: A suicide bomber kills five people in Tal Afar.
