= St Mary's Old Boys' Club, Crosby =

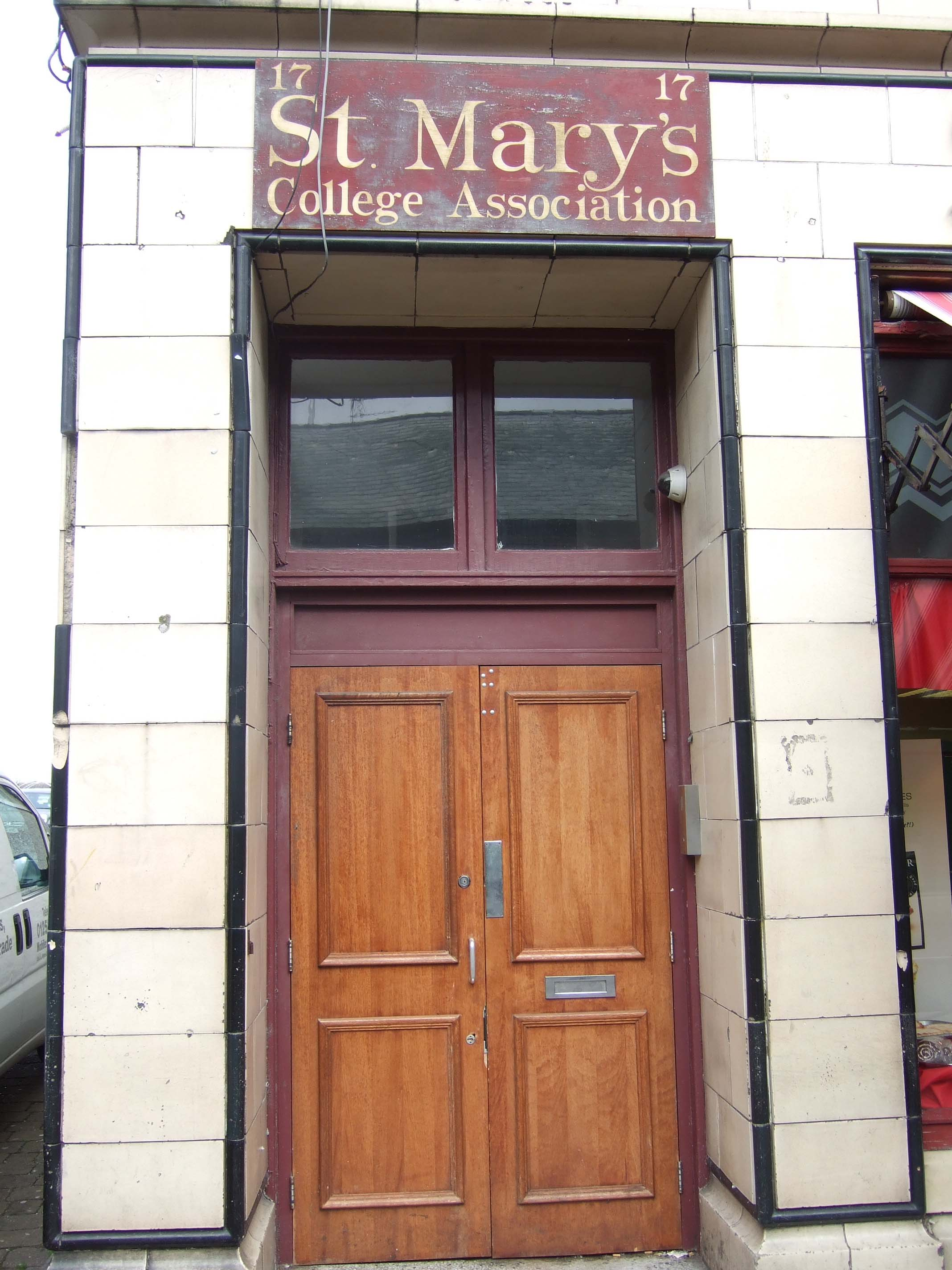
St Mary's Old Boys' Club pictured shortly after its closure by Sefton Council in April 2010

St Mary's Old Boys' Club (Note: The legal name of the club was changed to St Mary's College Association in 1987, under pressure from the School to reflect its now co-educational status. Few, if any, female pupils joined, and the club remained known by its former name, and colloquially as The Old Boys.) was the alumni association of St Mary's College, Crosby, and operated as a private members' club for over sixty years until its licence was revoked by the authorities in 2010 on the grounds that it was not a 'bona fide' club operated in good faith. The collapse of the club resulted in the bankruptcies of its chairman and his son for debts of circa £130,000 when it was discovered that the club's landlord, its brewery, and other creditors including Sefton Council had not been paid for several years. The club had continued to trade while insolvent, and had been unable to furnish the authorities with accounts when requested.

== History ==
St Mary's College, Crosby was founded in 1919 as a Catholic grammar school. In 1948, in a joint enterprise between the School and some prominent former pupils, an alumni association was founded, and premises were acquired. The clubhouse was originally sited in a house on Liverpool Road, Crosby named Woburn Lodge (Note: The house was demolished in 1962 and a commercial unit built on the site, for many years operated by Ryders motor car dealership.) but in 1962 the club took over the premises of the former Riley's Ballroom on Moor Lane, Crosby. The club was to remain here until its closure in 2010.

The objects of the club, according to its Constitution, were to provide "spiritual, recreational and sporting activities" to former pupils of the School. The Headmaster of St Mary's College was the President of the club, and the club was subject to the overriding authority of the School, though in practice was controlled by an executive committee elected by the members each year. It was believed that the club was the only alumni association in the UK holding a licence which permitted it to serve intoxicants seven-days-a-week.

== Scandal ==
Links between the School and the club were severed in 1999 owing to a scandal and resulting court case, Stringer v. Usher, Smith, Flanagan and Fleming. A member of the committee had been assaulted by fellow committee members while attempting to prevent illegal sales of intoxicants to non-members. An attempted witch-hunt against that member collapsed when the committee was forced into a humiliating climb-down at Liverpool County Court, incurring £10,000 in costs. An unlawful attempt to re-imburse the Defendants' costs out of club funds was abandoned under the threat of further legal action.

Headmaster Hammond then wrote a letter to Chairman Smith, in which he opined that it was 'inaccurate to view the club as an Old Boys' club', and that the club 'did not serve the interests of the School.'

Despite the school's repudiation of the club, and a specific request from the Headmaster to change its name, the club carried on regardless under the name of St Mary's Old Boys' Club. A further court case, Stringer v. Smith and Shaw followed in 2000 when the committee attempted to change the club's constitution to allow illegal functions at the club premises. Again the committee capitulated, incurring £3000 in costs. In 2000 and 2004 Merseyside Police raised objections to the continuance of the club on the grounds that it was 'improperly run' and for 'blatant disregard' of the licensing laws. Additionally, the Police did not believe the club was operating as a 'bona fide' members club. The club's trustees resigned at this point. In 2007, the school formed a new alumni association following a number of previous attempts to set up a similar organisation. The new alumni association recently held its first annual dinner but the event had poor ticket sales.

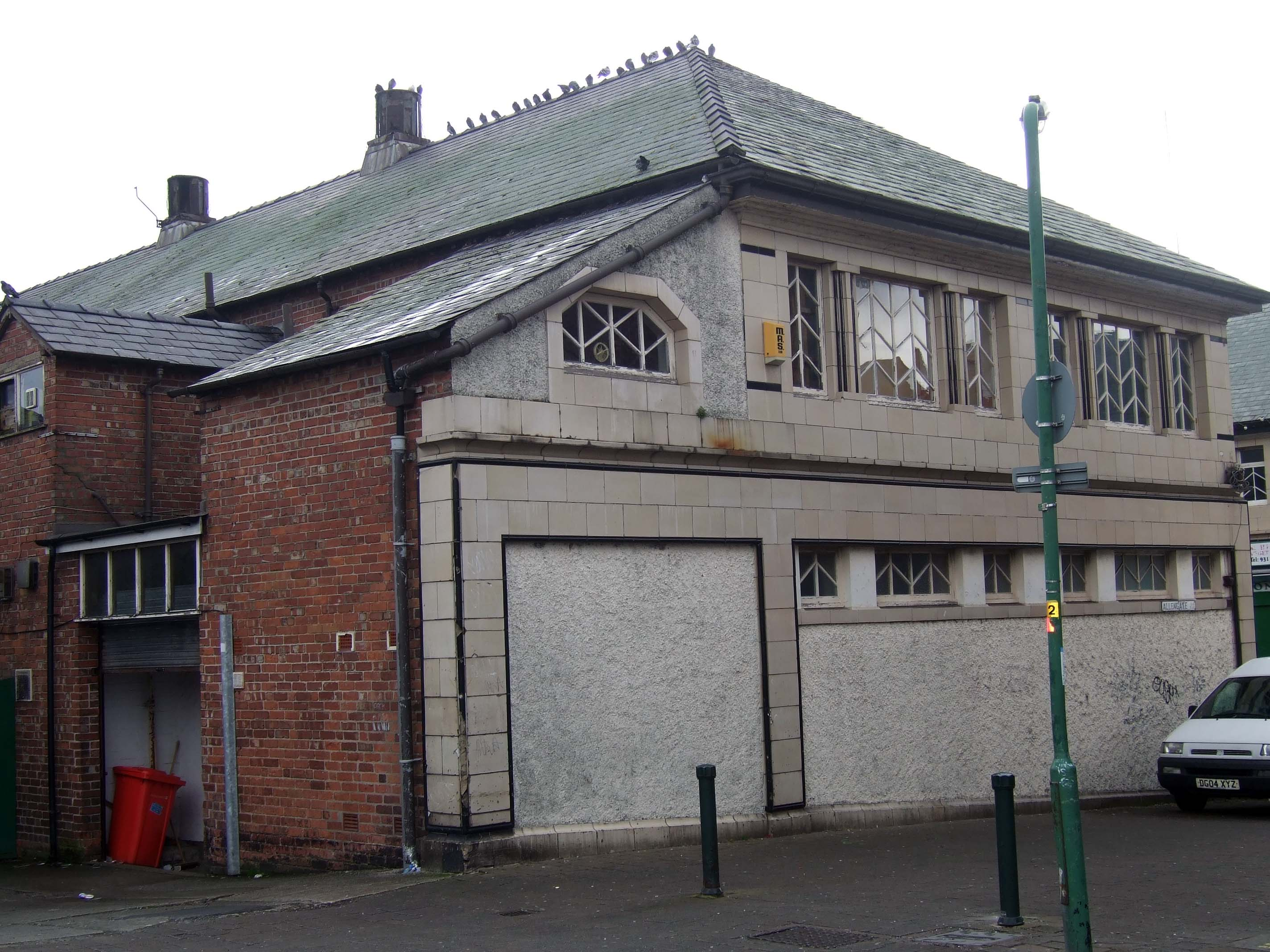
side and rear view of St Mary's Old Boys' Club

In March 2010 St Mary's Old Boys' Club collapsed when the police revoked its licence on the grounds that it was not a bona fide club operated in good faith. Simultaneously, the former club trustees found themselves being sued by their landlords for £72,000 of unpaid rent dating back to 2005. The Inland Revenue and Customs and Excise are also investigating the club for failure to pay Corporation Tax and VAT dating back to the 1990s.

On 18 October 2011, after failing to appear in court, the club chairman Kentigern Smith was declared bankrupt for club debts of £67,617 plus costs. On 29 November 2011 an attempt to set aside a statutory demand against his son, Dominic Smith, was dismissed with £1,190 costs, when Smith failed to appear in court. On 7 February 2012 Dominic Smith was declared bankrupt for club debts of £65,716 plus costs.

As a consequence, under the rule established in the High Court, the Smiths forfeit their (approx.) £130,000 inheritance under the will of the late Mrs. Margaret Smith, who died on 31 March 2011.
