= Gerard Weston =

The Reverend Father Gerard Weston MBE
- Born: 20 October 1933
- Died: 22 February 1972 (aged 38)
- Education: St Joseph's College, Up Holland

Ecclesiastical career
- Church: Roman Catholic Church
- Ordained: 1960
- Military career
- Allegiance: United Kingdom
- Branch: British Army
- Service years: 1966–1972
- Rank: Chaplain to the Forces Fourth Class (Captain)
- Unit: Royal Army Chaplains' Department
- Conflicts: The Troubles
- Awards: MBE (1972)

Gerard Edward Weston MBE (20 October 1933 – 22 February 1972) was a British Catholic priest and military chaplain who was killed during the 1972 Aldershot bombing in England during The Troubles.

== Biography ==
Weston was born on 20 October 1933 in Great Crosby, Lancashire, England. He was educated at St Mary's College, Crosby and then attended seminary at St. Joseph's College, Upholland.

In 1960, Weston was ordained as a Catholic priest by Archbishop John Heenan for the Archdiocese of Liverpool. He served as a curate at Holy Cross Church, St Helens, before moving to St Benedict's Church, Hindley in 1961. At St. Benedict's, he "founded a very successful youth club".

Weston joined the British Army in 1966 as a chaplain, and was commissioned in the Royal Army Chaplains' Department as a Chaplain to the Forces 4th Class (equivalent in rank to captain) on 13 February 1967. He converted from a short service commission to a regular commission on 13 February 1970, retaining his seniority in the rank of Chaplain to the Forces 4th Class from 13 February 1967. He served as a chaplain in Germany, the Persian Gulf, Kenya and Northern Ireland, and was the Roman Catholic Regimental Chaplain for the 16 Parachute Brigade.

During the height of the Troubles, he frequently visited alone, in civilian clerical dress, the dangerous areas of Springfield Road, Belfast, talking with local people in an attempt to reduce tension. He tried to bridge the gap between the Irish Catholic community and British Army. He was in great personal danger, especially after a rumour circulated that a British soldier was operating disguised as a priest.

On 15 February 1972, he was appointed the Member of the Order of the British Empire (MBE) "for gallant and distinguished services in Northern Ireland during the period 1st August 1971, to 31st October 1971".

Seven days later, Father Weston drew up in his Morris Traveller car at the car-park of the Officers' Mess of the 16th Parachute Brigade in Aldershot. As he was exiting his vehicle, a huge bomb exploded, killing the military chaplain instantly, together with six civilians. He was 38 years old. The Official IRA claimed responsibility, claiming retaliation for Bloody Sunday three weeks earlier. Public revulsion at the attack was in part responsible for the organisation ordering a ceasefire three months later, and it later disbanded.

Weston's Funeral Mass was held at St. Peter and St. Paul's Parish Church, Great Crosby; Cardinal Heenan presided and Archbishop George Beck delivered the sermon. He is buried at SS Peter and Paul Churchyard, Crosby, Merseyside.
