= Terrorist incidents in Iraq in 2005 =

2005 in Iraq was marked by the first elections held in the country since the fall of Saddam Hussein.

== January ==
- January 2: Suicide car bombers rammed a bus carrying Iraqi National Guardsmen outside a U.S. military base near Balad, 45 miles north of Baghdad, killing 26 people.
- January 3: A suicide car bomb near the Green Zone in Baghdad killed at least four foreign civilian contractors, including three Britons and an American. A suicide bomb in Baghdad exploded near the headquarters of the Iraqi National Accord Party, killing two police officers and a civilian. A suicide car bomber in Balad killed four Iraqi National Guardsmen and wounded 14.
- January 4: A suicide truck bomber targeted a compound housing an elite commando division of the Iraqi Police force in Baghdad, killing at least eight officers.
- January 5: Fezan Khan hit a police academy and recruiting station in Hillah during a graduation ceremony, killing 19 people. Six police officers were killed when a suicide car bomber struck a checkpoint in the al-Mafraq neighborhood of Baqubah. A suicide bomber struck in Baghdad near a US convoy, killing two Iraqi civilians.
- January 8: A suicide car bomb detonated by a gas station in southern Baghdad, killing four and wounding nineteen.
- January 10: A suicide bomber drove his vehicle into an Iraqi Border Security Forces base in Rubai'a, killing four soldiers. A suicide bomber detonated his vehicle in the courtyard of a police station in southern Baghdad, killing seven people including four police officers.
- January 11: A suicide bomber detonated his car near a police station in Tikrit, killing seven Iraqi policemen. A suicide car bomber targeted the Interior Ministry in Basra, killing one person. A suicide bomber detonated his vehicle outside the Independent Electoral Commission in Basra, injuring no-one but himself.
- January 13: Four suicide bombers struck in Baghdad within a 90-minute period, killing at least 25 Iraqis. The targets included the Australian embassy, a hospital, Baghdad International Airport, and the Iraqi Army base of Al-Muthanna Airport. None of the bombers penetrated the security checkpoints at their targets.
- January 16: A suicide car bomber struck at a crowd of people gathering for the funeral of a police officer in Kut, killing seven.
- January 17: At least ten people, including seven Iraqi Police officers, were killed when a suicide bomber exploded his vehicle at a checkpoint outside an Iraqi police headquarters in Baiji.
- January 18: A suicide car bomber killed four people outside the office of the Supreme Council for the Islamic Revolution in Iraq.
- January 19: 19 January 2005 Baghdad bombings – Five suicide bombings took place in Baghdad, killing a total of 26 people and wounding at least 30. All of the blasts targeted checkpoints manned by soldiers or police officers.
- January 21: Fourteen people were killed when a suicide car bomb exploded outside the al-Taf mosque just after morning prayers. Twelve people were killed when a suicide bomber drove his ambulance into a crowd of Shiites celebrating a wedding near Youssifiyah.
- January 23: A suicide bomber exploded a minivan packed with explosives outside a polling station in Hillah, injuring eight Iraqi army personnel.
- January 24: A suicide bomber detonated his vehicle at a police checkpoint outside the Baghdad party offices of the Iraqi National Accord Party, injuring ten people.
- January 26: Three suicide car bombs exploded within one hour of each other in the northern Iraqi town of Riyadh. Nine people were killed in the attacks which targeted an Iraqi army post, a police station and a road. A suicide bomber detonated a tractor bomb outside the Kurdistan Democratic Party office in Sinjar, killing fifteen people.
- January 27: A suicide bomber detonated his vehicle outside the Diyala provincial governor's office, killing four people. Another car bomber attacked a US military base in the center of Ramadi. It was not clear if any casualties were caused.
- January 28: A suicide car bomb exploded outside of the al-Dora police station and a power station in southern Baghdad, killing six police officers.
- January 29: A suicide vest bomber blew himself up near the US-Iraqi Joint Coordination Center in Khanaqin, killing eight people.
- January 30: Eight or nine suicide vest bombers, mostly targeting polling stations, struck in Baghdad on election day. Another suicide bomber hit a minibus carrying voters to the polls near Hillah, killing at least four people.

== February ==
- February 3: A suicide car bomber detonated his vehicle near a foreign convoy on Baghdad Airport Road. No official casualty figures were released.
- February 7: A suicide bomber targeted a hospital in Mosul, killing at least 12 policemen. A suicide bomber detonated his vehicle near a crowd of police recruits in Baqubah, killing 15.
- February 8: A suicide bomber walked into a crowd of Iraqi Army recruits outside the Iraqi National Guard Headquarters at the Muthana airfield in Baghdad, killing at least 20 people.
- February 11: A suicide bomber blew up a car bomb near the a Shiite mosque in Balad Ruz at the end of evening prayers, killing 12 people.
- February 17: In Baghdad, a man wearing two suicide vests filled with explosives was shot and killed before he could detonate them.
- February 18: A suicide bomber blew himself up outside the al-Khadimain Mosque in Baghdad, killing 17 people. Two suicide bombers attacked the Ali Baiya Mosque in Baghdad, killing ten. One of the bombers detonated his explosives, but the other was shot by a guard before he was able to detonate his. A suicide bomber detonated himself at a checkpoint in a Sunni neighborhood in Baghdad, killing two police officers and one national guard member.
- February 19: A suicide vest bomber struck a bus filled with Shiite worshippers in Kadhimiya, killing 17. A suicide bomber blew himself up near the Nada Mosque in Baghdad's Kadhimiya neighborhood, killing seven Shiites. A suicide bomber detonated his explosives near an academic building in Kadhimiya, injuring no-one but himself. Another bomber in Kadhimiya was killed by US troops before he could detonate his explosive device. Also in Baghdad, three suicide bombers detonated their explosive devices in a procession of worshippers participating in the Ashura holiday, killing five. A suicide bomber drove his scooter into a tent filled with Sunnis attending a funeral in Baghdad, killing six people. A suicide car bomber struck an Iraqi National Guard base in Baqouba, killing one guardsman. A suicide car bomber targeted an Iraqi army checkpoint in Latifiya, killing two Iraqi soldiers. A suicide bomber preparing to launch an attack in Baghdad was detained by Iraqi soldiers before he could detonate his bomb.
- February 22: A suicide car bomber hit a convoy of police commandos in Baghdad, killing two police officers. Police arrested a Sudanese man who was attempting to detonate his explosive belt inside of the Adnan Khair Allah hospital.
- February 24: A suicide car bomber struck a police compound in Tikrit, killing fifteen officers. A suicide car bomb exploded in Iskandariya, targeting the police headquarters and the nearby offices of the Supreme Council for Islamic Revolution in Iraq. Two police officers were killed and eight people injured.
- February 28: At least 120 people die when a suicide car bomber in Hilla explodes his vehicle amongst a crowd of people applying for jobs in Iraq's new security forces. 130 more are wounded in the deadliest single attack of the nearly 2-year-old insurgency. A suicide car bomb exploded at a police checkpoint in Musayyib, killing at least one police officer and wounding several others.

== March ==
- March 2: A suicide car bomb targeted an Iraqi Army recruiting center at the Al-Muthanna Airport Army Base in Baghdad, killing six people.
- March 3: Two suicide car bombers targeted the Interior Ministry building in Baghdad, killing five police officers. A suicide car bomber killed one person outside the headquarters for the Iraqi emergency police in Baqubah.
- March 7: A suicide car bomb exploded outside an Iraqi police station in Baqubah, killing 11 people.
- March 8: Four potential suicide belt bombers were arrested in Baghdad before carrying out their attacks. All the would-be bombers were female.
- March 9: A garbage truck with two suicide bombers on board blew up near the Al-Sadir Hotel and the Agriculture Ministry building. Four people were killed.
- March 10: A suicide bomber attacked a funeral being held at a Shiite mosque in Mosul, killing 47 people and injuring more than 100.
- March 14: A suicide car bomb killed four people outside a police and army checkpoint north of Baghdad.
- March 15: A suicide car bomber killed a child when he attempted to target a police patrol in northeastern Baghdad.
- March 20: A suicide bomber infiltrated Mosul's police HQ and blew himself up in the office of the city's anti-corruption department, killing two. A suicide car bomber killed two civilians when he targeted a convoy of foreigners in Fallujah.
- March 21: The driver of a suicide truck bomb killed only himself when he detonated his cargo prematurely near a hospital in Samarra, Salah al-Din province.
- March 24: A suicide car bomb killed 11 Iraqi special police commandos and 2 U.S. Marines at a checkpoint in Ramadi.
- March 28: A suicide motorcycle bomber killed five people at a checkpoint set up to protect pilgrims near Musayyib. A suicide car bomb struck a crowd of Shiite pilgrims on the road between Hilla and Karbala, killing six.
- March 31: A suicide car bomb hit a temporary checkpoint set up to guard a Shiite shrine in Tuz Khurmatu, south of Kirkuk. The attack killed five people.

== April ==
- April 16: A suicide car bombing near a foreign convoy on the Baghdad Airport Road killed American aid worker Marla Ruzicka and her Iraqi translator, Faiz Ali Salim.
- April 19: Two American soldiers were killed in a suicide car bomb attack on a U.S. military convoy near an apartment complex in western Baghdad.
- April 21: A suicide bombing on the road to Baghdad Airport killed at least one person: English security contractor Alan Parkin.
- April 24: Two suicide car bombs hit an Iraqi police academy in Tikrit, killing at least 6 people and wounding 26 others.
- April 29: Two U.S. Marines died when a suicide bomber exploded his vehicle near Diyarah, 30 miles south of Baghdad. In a separate incident, a suicide car bomb killed a U.S. soldier and wounded two others near Taji.

== May ==
- May 1: A suicide car bomber targeted a U.S. military convoy in Al-Za'franiya, killing 5 Iraqi civilians. Separately, a suicide bomber detonated a vest packed with explosives at a Kurdish funeral in Tal Afar, killing 25 people and wounding 50.
- May 4: A suicide bombing attack killed 60 people and injured approximately 150 others in Erbil. Army of Ansar al-Sunna claimed responsibility for the bombing.
- May 7: A suicide car bomb in Baghdad's Tahrir Square killed 22 people, including two American security contractors and a number of Iraqi children. In a separate incident, a U.S. Marine was killed in an explosion caused by a VBIED suicide attack near Haditha Dam in Al Anbar province.
- May 24: A suicide car bombing killed three U.S. soldiers in central Baghdad.

== June ==
- June 14: A suicide bomber targets a bank in Kirkuk, killing 23 people and wounding nearly 100. In Kan'an, 30 miles north of Baghdad, five Iraqi soldiers are killed and two wounded in a suicide car bombing at a checkpoint.
- June 23: Insurgent suicide car bomber struck a U.S. convoy in Fallujah, killing 5 U.S. Marines and one U.S. Navy Sailor. 13 U.S. Marines were also wounded in the incident, 11 of whom were women.
- June 26: Three suicide bombings hit Iraqi army & police posts in Mosul, killing 15 police officers and 18 civilians.
- June 28: One U.S. soldier was killed in a suicide car bomb near a Coalition base in Ad Dujayl. Another suicide bomb attack left one U.S. soldier dead and 2 wounded west of Tikrit.

== July ==
- July 13: A suicide bomber blew up a vehicle near a U.S. military convoy and a large group of Iraqi children in Baghdad, killing 27 people. At least 7 children and one U.S. soldier were killed and three soldiers were wounded.
- July 14: A double-suicide bombing targeted a checkpoint to Green Zone, killing one person and wounding 5 others. Among the wounded was a potential third suicide bomber, a critically wounded man outfitted with a suspected explosive device that had not detonated.
- July 15: A suicide car bomb targeting an Iraqi police commando patrol in the southwestern Baghdad neighborhood of al-Shurat al-Khamsa killed 5 people and wounded 20 others.
- July 16: In Musayyib, a suicide bomber blew up a fuel truck in front of a Shiite mosque, killing over 90 and injuring 150.
- July 17: A suicide car bomber struck the offices of Iraq's electoral commission in eastern Baghdad, killing five election employees and one policeman. In another suicide attack, insurgents dumped two bodies on the road, then struck police who stopped to inspect them. About an hour later a suicide car bomber attacked a police convoy near a bus station in southern Baghdad, killing three police commandos and four civilians. Another suicide car bomber missed a US convoy but blasted two minibuses, killing six civilians in Mahmoudiya.
- July 29: A suicide bomber killed at least 26 people when he targeted an army recruiting center in the northern Iraqi town of Rubia.

== August ==
- August 1: A U.S. Marine was killed by a suicide car bomb while conducting combat operations near Hit in Al Anbar province.
- August 2: A suicide car bomber attacked a U.S. military convoy as it traveled though an underpass beneath Tahrir Square in Baghdad, wounding 29 people.
- August 6: A suicide car bomber killed a U.S. Marine in the western Iraqi city of Al-Amiriyah.
- August 7: A suicide bomber blew up a fuel tanker near the Iraqi police headquarters in Tikrit, killing two police officers and wounding 10 others.
- August 9: A suicide car bomber targeted a U.S. military convoy near the Tayaran Square in central Baghdad. The blast killed one U.S. soldier and wounded 52, including two U.S. soldiers.
- August 10: A suicide car bombing killed six people and wounded 14 in the Ghazaliya neighborhood, Baghdad.
- August 23: A suicide bomber struck the joint U.S. and Iraqi Police (IP) dining facility inside the Baquba police headquarters around lunch time. The attack claimed the lives of numerous Iraqis and two U.S. personnel: American International Police Liaison Officer Mike Dawes and 1st Lieutenant Carlos Diaz.

== September ==
- September 9: Suicide bombers with two large dump trucks loaded with an estimated 2,500 pounds of explosives each were stopped from entering FOB Kalsu by a small patrol of U.S. Special Forces. The dump trucks exploded killing at least 19 Iraqis, and injuring 4 U.S Special Forces soldiers.
- September 14: A suicide bomber blew himself up among a crowd of poor Shiite Muslim laborers waiting for work in Baghdad, killing at least 112. Possibly more suicide attacks on this day
- September 19: A suicide car bombing in Mosul killed at least three American security contractors.
- September 28: In the first female suicide bombing of the post-Baathist insurgency, a woman dressed as a man detonated her explosive belt outside a US military facility in Tal Afar, killing nine and wounding thirty. Al Qaeda in Iraq claimed responsibility.

== October ==
- October 4: A car bomb exploded near one of the main entrances to Baghdad's Green Zone, killing two Iraqi soldiers and a civilian.
- October 6: A suicide car bombing killed 10 people and wounded eight others near the Iraqi Oil Ministry in eastern Baghdad. Elsewhere, a suicide car bomber targeted a convoy of private American security contractors in central Baghdad, wounding eight Iraqi civilians.
- October 10: Insurgent suicide car bomb leaves U.S. and Iraqi soldiers dead outside a checkpoint in Baghdad, Iraq.
- October 11: Insurgent suicide bomb attacks leave over 30 people dead in Tal Afar, northwest Iraq. At least 20 people were also killed when a suicide car bomb, targeting an Iraqi army convoy, detonated near a gas station in Amiriyah.
- October 12: At least 30 people die following an insurgent suicide bomb attack in Tal Afar, the second such attack in as many days. Three other suicide car bombs took place in Baghdad and Baqouba, including an assassination attempt on Iraq’s minister of provincial affairs, Saad Naif al-Hardan. In that attack, a bomber in Baghdad targeted a convoy of cars preparing to pick up the minister at his office, leaving five bodyguards and five bystanders wounded. Possible fifth other attack on this day.

== November ==
- November 9: A failed car bombing of US troops killed a female suicide bomber and injured one US soldier. The bomber was later identified as Muriel Degauque from Belgium, who had converted to Islam after marrying a Moroccan man.
- November 10: At least 30 people have died following an insurgent suicide bomb attack on a restaurant in Baghdad.
- November 14: A suicide bombing in Baghdad killed at least three South African security contractors.
- November 18: Two suicide bombers wearing explosive belts struck two Shia mosques in the town of Khanaqin near the Iranian border, killing at least 74 people. Two suicide car bombs exploded outside an interior ministry building in the central Jadiriya district of Baghdad, killing six people.
- November 23: One suicide car bomber kills 18 people, mostly Iraqi police in an ambush in the northern Iraqi city of Kirkuk.
- November 24: 15 people die after a suicide bomb attack in Hilla.

== December ==
- December 6: A pair of suicide bombers kill 40 and wound 70 in an attack on a police academy in eastern Baghdad. One of the suicide bombers detonated near a group of students outside a classroom, and then when the Iraqi police and students fled to a bunker for shelter, a second bomber detonated his vest.
- December 8: A suicide bomber detonated inside a passenger bus in southern Baghdad, killing 30 passengers and wounding 40.
- December 9: One U.S. soldier was killed in a suicide car bombing in Abu Ghraib district. The terrorist attack also wounded 11 other U.S. soldiers and one Iraqi civilian.
- December 11: One U.S. soldier was killed by a suicide car bomber near Ramadi.
- December 19: An Iraqi police colonel was almost assassinated when a suicide bomber attacked the colonel's convoy in Baghdad, two civilians were killed.
- December 25: A suicide bomber attacked two Iraqi army vehicles in central Baghdad killing five soldiers and wounding seven policemen and civilians.
- December 26: A suicide bomber threw grenades at police recruits outside a training center killing two and then detonated his explosive belt.
- December 29: A suicide bomber killed four police officers in Baghdad.
- December 30: A suicide bomber killed a police officer in Baghdad.
