= 2011 Logar province bombing =

Suicide car bombing in Afghanistan

25 June 2011 Logar Province bombing
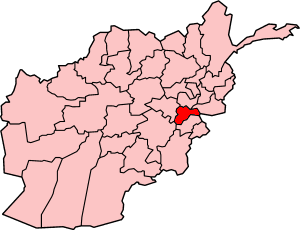
- Location: Logar Province, Azra District, eastern Afghanistan
- Date: 25 June 2011 (GMT+4:30)
- Target: Public Hospital (Civilian Hospital)
- Attack type: Suicide car bombing
- Deaths: 43
- Injuries: 53
- Perpetrator: Taliban

On 25 June 2011 a suicide car bombing occurred in Azra District, Logar Province, Afghanistan, targeting Akbar Khail hospital, a 10-bed facility near the Pakistani border, killing at least 43 people, including children, pregnant women, and medical staff. The suicide bomber drove a sport utility vehicle through the front gate of the facility, striking a guard, before detonating his explosives. The blast destroyed the one-story hospital and buried people under the rubble. The Taliban denied responsibility for the attack, claiming the perpetrator to be "someone with an agenda," possibly the Haqqani network.

== Sources ==
- At least 20 killed in suicide bombing in east Afghanistan. Retrieved: 25 September 2011.
- Afghanistan suicide attack kills 35. Retrieved: 25 September 2011.
