= 2005 Balad bombings =

Series of car bombings in Balad, Iraq

- Location: Balad, Iraq
- Date: September 29, 2005
- Attack type: Suicide bombings
- Deaths: 95
- Injuries: 100+

On September 29, 2005, three near-simultaneous car bombs exploded in Balad, Iraq. The bombs went off in a busy vegetable market, by a bank and by a police station. More than 95 were killed and 100 wounded.
