= 2004 Basra police station bombings =

Bombing of police stations in Basra, Iraq

Basra police station bombings
- Part of Iraqi insurgency (2003–2006) in the Iraq War
- Location: Basra, Iraq
- Date: 21 April 2004 (UTC+3)
- Target: Police stations
- Attack type: car bombs
- Deaths: 74
- Injuries: 100+
- Perpetrator: Unknown

On 21 April 2004, a series of large car bomb explosions ripped through Basra, Iraq. Seventy-four people died and more than 100 were injured. The attacks were some of the deadliest in southern Iraq since the fall of President Saddam Hussein.

== The attacks ==
Three separate bombs exploded outside police stations in central Basra; two in the Ashar area and one in the Old City. In these bombings, many children on passing buses were killed.

A fourth, separate attack also occurred around the same time in the town of Az Zubayr. In the fourth attack, two car bombs exploded, one inside the main entrance to the British military outpost and the second just outside the wire fence surround which killed three Iraqis and wounded five British soldiers of the 1st Battalion, the Royal Welch Fusiliers, one seriously. British forces trying to aid casualties were stoned by crowds and came under fire from Iraqi snipers, while trying to recover the wounded. The crowds blamed the coalition for not doing enough to protect Iraqi citizens from such attacks.

The police reported that the majority of those who lost their lives were non-combatants, who died in a series of bombings. The bombings occurred in close proximity to three police stations in Basra and two others at the Regional Police Academy located in Az Zubayr.
