= 2003 Imam Ali Shrine bombing =

2003 bombing in Najaf, Iraq

Imam Ali Shrine bombing
- Part of Iraqi insurgency (2003–2006) in Iraqi insurgency (2003–2011)
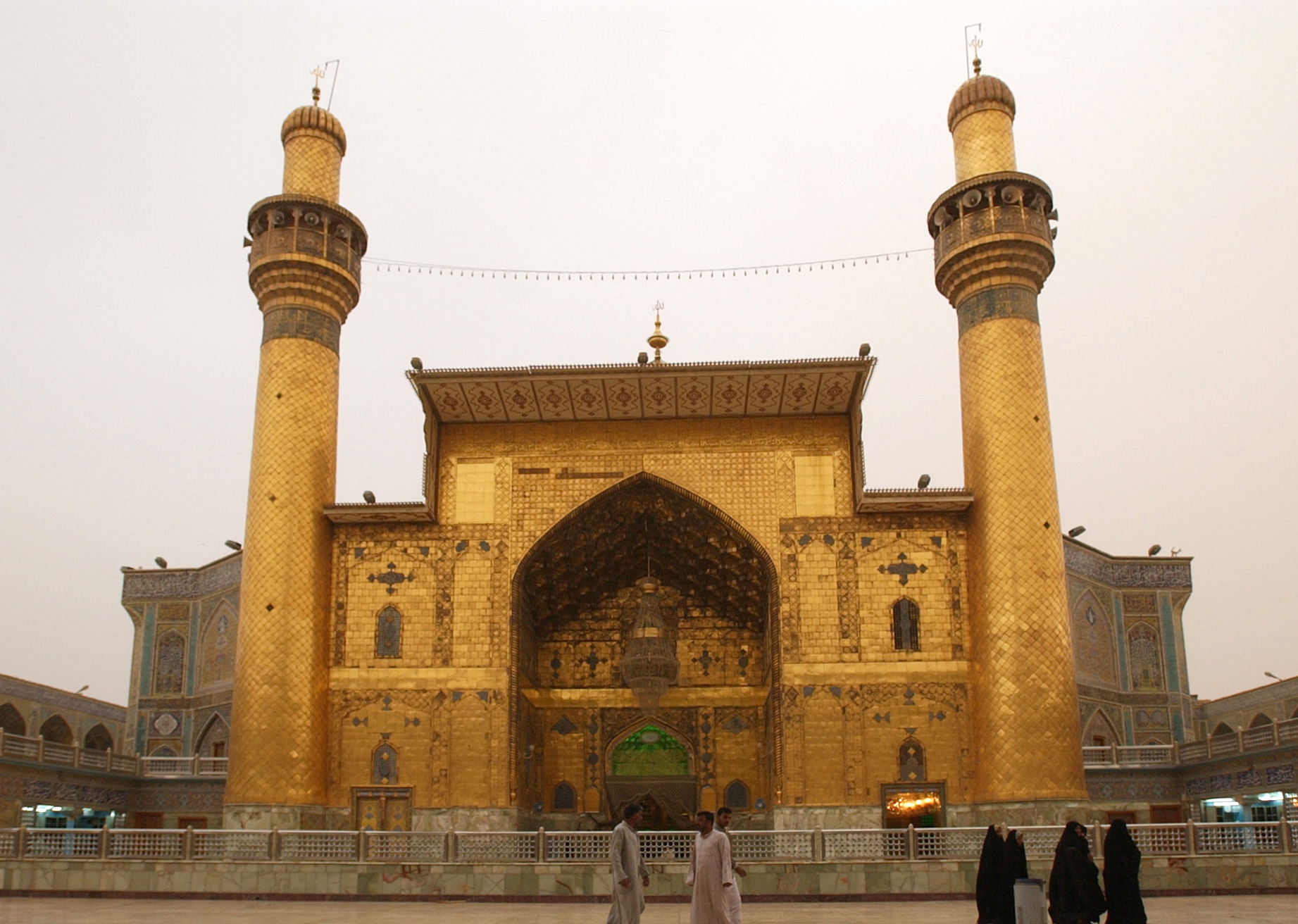
- The Imam Ali mosque
- Location: 31.9958°N 44.3097°E; Najaf, Iraq
- Date: 29 August 2003
- Target: Imam Ali Shrine
- Attack type: Car bomb
- Deaths: 95
- Injuries: 500+
- Perpetrator: Jama'at al-Tawhid wal-Jihad

The Imam Ali mosque bombing was the detonation of two car bombs outside the Shia Imam Ali Shrine in Najaf on 29 August 2003. The attack killed 95 people crowded around the mosque for Friday prayers, including Ayatollah Mohammed Baqir al-Hakim, spiritual leader of the Supreme Council of the Islamic Revolution in Iraq.

The attack was devastating for the Shia community in Iraq, because such a revered cleric was killed as well as over 90 other people. The bombing was the deadliest attack in Iraq in 2003.

In response to the attack, thousands of Shia mourners marched in the streets of cities and towns across Iraq. The mourners, many of whom blamed Saddam Hussein's loyalists for the attack, held anti-Ba'athist protests.

Saddam himself released a taped audio message in which he denied having any involvement.

== Perpetrators ==
U.S. and Iraqi officials accused Abu Musab al-Zarqawi of orchestrating Muhammad Baqir's assassination. They claimed that Yassin Jarad, Zarqawi's father-in-law, was the suicide bomber who detonated the bomb.

The US Department of Defense condemned the August 29, 2003 bombing at the Imam Ali Mosque in Al Najaf, Iraq. They offered their condolences to the victims and their families and expressed their commitment to working with the Iraqi people to build a better future.

Following the bombing, local Shia leaders requested assistance from the FBI to investigate the bombing to determine if it was the work of Al-Qaeda. FBI forensic investigators were flown into an airstrip south of Najaf just days later and were escorted to the Imam Ali Shrine to investigate, as well as inspect the remains of dozens of victims that were stored in stored in metal shipping containers until their arrival.
