= 1972 Aldershot bombing =

1972 bombing by the Official IRA

Coordinates: 51.2549°N 0.7701°W

- Part of the Troubles
- Location: Aldershot Garrison
- Date: 22 February 1972; 12:15 pm (GMT)
- Target: 16th Parachute Brigade
- Attack type: Car bomb
- Deaths: 7 (1 military chaplain, 6 civilians)
- Injuries: 19
- Perpetrator: Official IRA
- Assailant: Noel Jenkinson
- Motive: Revenge for Bloody Sunday

The 1972 Aldershot bombing was a car bomb attack by the Official Irish Republican Army on 22 February 1972 in Aldershot, England. The bomb targeted the headquarters of the British Army's 16th Parachute Brigade and was claimed as a revenge attack for Bloody Sunday (30 January 1972). Six civilian staff and a Catholic military chaplain were killed and 19 were wounded. It was the Official IRA's largest attack in Great Britain during "the Troubles" and one of its last major actions before it declared a permanent ceasefire in May 1972. Official IRA member Noel Jenkinson was convicted and imprisoned for his part in the bombing.

== Background ==
The 1969 Northern Ireland riots marked the beginning of the conflict known as the Troubles. To maintain law and order in Northern Ireland the British Army was deployed on to its streets in rioting hot-spots such as Derry and Belfast to support the Royal Ulster Constabulary (RUC). In December 1969 the Irish Republican Army split into two factions – the Official IRA and the Provisional IRA. Both factions' retaliation against the British Army during the Falls Curfew in Belfast resulted in paramilitary campaigns against the British state's forces commencing.

On 30 January 1972, soldiers of the 1st Battalion, Parachute Regiment shot 28 unarmed civilians during a Northern Ireland Civil Rights Association march in Derry. Fourteen people died, including teenagers. This incident became known as Bloody Sunday and dramatically increased recruitment to the two IRAs.

== The bombing ==
The target of the Official IRA bomb was the headquarters of the 16th Parachute Brigade, elements of which had been involved in the Bloody Sunday shootings. Despite warnings, the 'open' garrison meant there was no security or controlled access to the camp.

A hired Ford Cortina car containing a 280 pounds (130 kg) time bomb was left in the car park, deliberately positioned outside the officer's mess. The bomb exploded at 12:40 pm on 22 February, destroying the officer's mess and wrecking several nearby Army office buildings.

The soldiers who were the intended targets were not present, as the regiment itself was stationed abroad and most staff officers were in their offices rather than the mess. Nonetheless, six civilian staff and one army chaplain were killed – five female staff who were leaving the premises, a gardener, and Father Gerard Weston, a Roman Catholic priest from the Royal Army Chaplains' Department. Nineteen people were also wounded by the explosion. Aside from the priest Weston (38), the others who died during the attack were the gardener John Haslar (58), and civilians working in the Mess at the time, Jill Mansfield (34), Thelma Bosley (44), Margaret Grant (32), Sheri Munton (20) and Joan Lunn (39).

On 23 February, the Official IRA issued a statement claiming that it had carried out the attack in revenge for Bloody Sunday. It added: "Any civilian casualties would be very much regretted as our target was the officers responsible for the Derry outrages". The Official IRA also said that the bombing would be the first of many such attacks on the headquarters of British Army regiments serving in Northern Ireland.

== Aftermath ==
As the bomb had mostly killed civilians, the Official IRA received harsh and widespread criticism. On 29 May 1972, the Official IRA's leadership called a ceasefire and stated that it would only launch future attacks in self-defence. The Aldershot bombing was believed to have been one of the factors that led to this decision.

In November 1972, Noel Jenkinson, 42, a transport manager, was convicted for his part in the terrorist bombing and was sentenced to life imprisonment with the presiding judge Sir Sebag Shaw recommending that he serve at least 30 years. Finbar Kissane, 32, and Michael Duignan, 28 were both convicted of complicity and sentenced to prison terms of 2 years and 2.5 years respectively.

Jenkinson, a Protestant originally from Loughcrew County Meath and a father of four, had been a trade unionist in London. He had also been a member of the Committee to Defeat Revisionism, for Communist Unity and Clann na hÉireann, an association sympathetic to the Official IRA. The evidence relating to Jenkinson was initially linked to his fraudulent hire (with Kissane) of a Ford Cortina car that was then used in the fatal bombing leading to the subsequent discovery of a case of gelignite found in his garden shed, as publicised at the time. The trial in Winchester Crown Court lasted 21 days.

In the following years, the larger and more militant Provisional IRA continued its campaign and began to attack military and commercial targets in England.

Jenkinson died in HMP Leicester in 1976 at the age of 46, with heart failure cited as the cause of death. He had been just transferred from HMP Wormwood Scrubs and had written an article expressing support for the Provisional IRA. He was buried at Dean's Grange Cemetery Dublin.
