= Al Khalis =

Town in Diyala, Iraq

Al Khalis الخالص
- Town
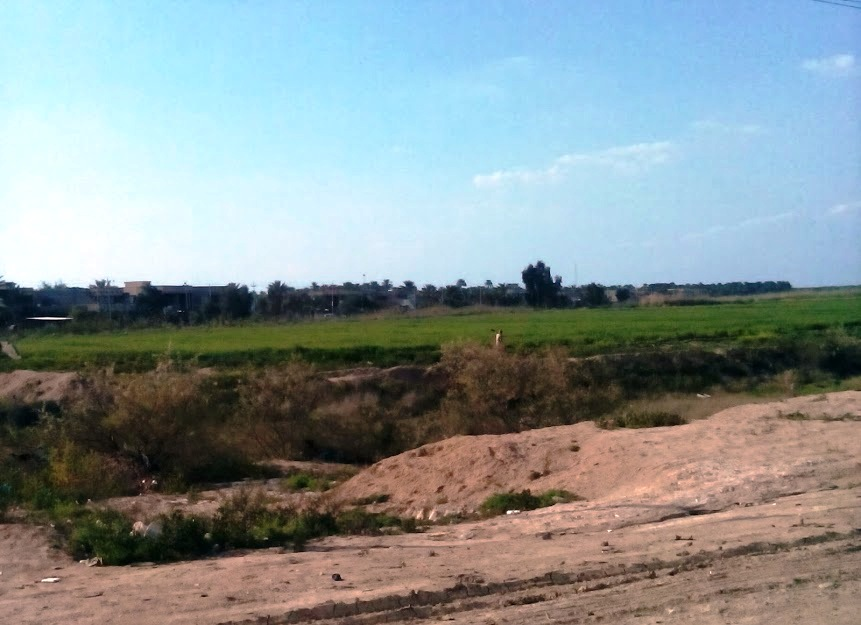

- Location within Iraq
- Country: Iraq
- Governorate: Diyala
- District: Khalis Arfan

Al Khalis (Khalis or Khales) (Arabic: الخالص) is a town in Diyala, Iraq, roughly 15 kilometers (9 mi) northwest of Baqubah and roughly 55 kilometres (34 mi) northeast of Baghdad

The Khalis Arfan district previously housed the Mujahedin-e Khalq (PMOI, MEK, MKO) in Camp Ashraf.

== See also ==
- List of places in Iraq
- List of cities in Iraq
