= Islam in Iceland =

Islam in Europe by percentage of country population 95–100%: Azerbaijan; 90–95%: Turkey; Kosovo; 50–70%: Albania; Bosnia and Herzegovina; Kazakhstan; 30–35%: North Macedonia; 10–20%: France; Georgia; Montenegro; 5–10%: Austria; Belgium; Bulgaria; Denmark; Germany; Liechtenstein; Luxembourg; Netherlands; Russia; Sweden; Switzerland; United Kingdom; Spain; Greece; 4–5%: Serbia; 2–4%: Italy; Finland; Norway; Malta; Slovenia; Cyprus (Note: Only takes into account the Muslim population residing on land controlled by the Republic of Cyprus.); 1–2%: Croatia; Ireland; Ukraine; Andorra; < 1%: Iceland; Armenia; Belarus; Czech Republic; Estonia; Hungary; Latvia; Lithuania; Moldova; Monaco; Poland; Portugal; Romania; San Marino; Slovakia

Muslim culture Centre of Iceland is located at second floor in a house called Ýmishúsið in Reykjavík.

Islam in Iceland is a minority religion. The Pew Research Center estimated that the number of Muslims in Iceland was below its 10,000 minimum threshold, and official statistics put the figure at around 2 100, or 0.5% out of the total population of 394,324 as of 2026.

In 2011, Icelandic Muslims attracted the interest of Al Jazeera; the channel planned a documentary dealing with Muslims in Iceland and New Zealand. Al Jazeera was interested in how Ramadan is honored in the higher latitudes where the night without sun and the sun is 24/7 can be of unusual length when compared to the majority-Muslim lands.

== History ==
The earliest mention of Iceland in Muslim sources originates in the works of Muhammad al-Idrisi (1099–1165/66) in his famous Tabula Rogeriana, which mentions Iceland's location in the North Sea.

The long-distance trading and raiding networks of the Vikings will have meant that various Icelanders, like the Norwegians Rögnvald Kali Kolsson or Harald Hardrada, came into direct contact with the Muslim world during the Middle Ages; indirect connections are best attested by finds of Arabic coins in Iceland, as also widely in the Viking world.

Following Iceland's conversion to Christianity around 1000, some Icelanders encountered the Islamic world through pilgrimage, for example to Jerusalem, of the kind described by Abbot Nikulás Bergsson in his Leiðarvísir og borgarskipan.

From around the late thirteenth century, a fantastical version of the Islamic world is prominent in medieval Icelandic romance, partly inspired by Continental narratives influenced by the Crusades. Although this image generally characterises the Islamic world as 'heathen', and repeats the misconceptions of Islam widespread in the medieval West, it also varies substantially from text to text, sometimes, for example, associating the Islamic world with great wealth, wisdom, or chivalry. Romance continued to serve as a medium for Icelanders to contemplate Islam in the post-medieval period, for example in Jón Oddsson Hjaltalín's eighteenth-century romance Fimmbræðra saga, which combined traditional storytelling with Continental Enlightenment scholarship.

Perhaps the earliest known example of Muslims coming to Iceland occurred in 1627, when the Dutch Muslim Jan Janszoon and his Barbary pirates raided portions of Iceland, including the southwest coast, Vestmannaeyjar, and the eastern fjords. This event is known in Icelandic history as the Tyrkjaránið (the "Turkish Abductions"). An estimated 400-800 Icelanders were sold into slavery.

Islam started to gain presence in Icelandic culture around the 1970s, partly through immigration from the Islamic world (for example Salmann Tamimi) and partly through Icelanders' exposure to Islamic culture while travelling (for example Ibrahim Sverrir Agnarsson). Some of the immigrants simply came of their own accord; others came as refugees, including groups from Kosovo. The Quran was first translated into Icelandic in 1993, with a corrected edition in 2003.

== Demographics ==
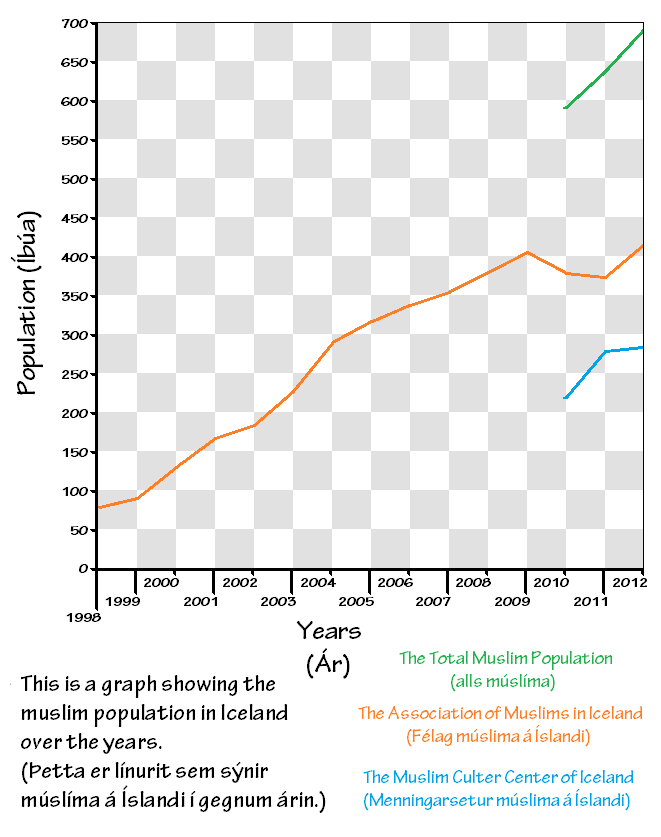
Members of Muslim Associations in Iceland as a function of time

Salmann Tamimi estimates that when he came to Iceland in 1971 there were perhaps seven Muslims living there. As of 2026, however,

- "The Icelandic Muslim Association" (Félag múslima á Íslandi) has 569 members.
- "The Islamic Foundation of Iceland" (Stofnun múslima á Íslandi) has 870 members.
- "The Islamic Cultural Centre of Iceland" (Menningarsetur múslima á Íslandi) has 690 members.

The first generation of Muslims born in Iceland likely began with people like Salmann's own children, such as Yousef Ingi Tamimi (b. 1988). Iceland's Muslim population is of diverse origins, including people born in the Arab world, Albania, Bosnia and Herzegovina, Africa, and Iceland.

== Organisations ==
=== Icelandic Muslim Association ===
The Icelandic Muslim Association (Félag múslima á Íslandi) was founded in 1997 by Salmann Tamimi, a Palestinian immigrant; it was officially recognised on February 25. Since 2010 the chair has been Ibrahim Sverrir Agnarsson. As of 2026, the association has 569 members. More than half were born in Iceland; perhaps 40-50 were born to non-Muslim parents.

The Icelandic Muslim Association currently runs the Reykjavík Mosque, a Sunni mosque on the third floor of an office building in Ármúli 38, Reykjavík. It has two imams and offers daily and nightly prayers attended by a mix of local Icelanders and visiting Muslims. It also offers weekly Friday prayers for Jumu'ah. In 2000 the Muslim Association applied to purpose-build a mosque in Reykjavík; after a long process, permission for building was granted on July 6, 2013.

Prayers are said in Arabic, but English and Icelandic are also widely used due to the diverse nature of the congregation. The Association regularly runs courses in both Arabic and Icelandic. On Saturdays there are Quran lessons for kids of different ages.

=== Islamic Cultural Centre of Iceland ===
The Islamic Culture Centre of Iceland (Menningarsetur múslima á Íslandi) was founded in 2008 by Karim Askari, originally from Morocco, and as of 2026 has 690 members. The Centre hired Ahmad Seddeeq, originally from Egypt, as Imam in 2011.

The Islamic Cultural Centre of Iceland runs a mosque in Ýmishúsið on Skógarhlíð in Reykjavík.

== Discrimination ==
One of the main researchers on Icelandic attitudes to racial and religious groups, Kristín Loftsdóttir, has found that many Icelanders exhibit anti-immigrant discourses linked with Islamophobia in ways parallel those in other European countries, despite Iceland having an often completely different history of contact with Islamic cultures. Many public expressions of Islamophobia have in the second decade of the twenty-first century been focused on opposition to the creation of a purpose-built Reykjavík mosque. Opposition to Islam is often presented in terms of support for gender equality, a discourse which in Kristín's assessment is 'used as a way to dwell on the criticism of Muslims in general, and to the glory of European societies'. Óttar M. Norðfjörð's 2010 novel Örvitinn eða; Hugsjónamaðurinn satirises Islamophobic attitudes.

Many Muslims in Iceland prefer not to join a formal organisation, considering their relationship with God a personal one.

== Religious organisation affiliation ==
Muslim Association of Iceland (1 January)
Year	Population	Muslim Association	%	±
1998	272,381	78	0.03	0.00
1999	275,712	89	0.03	0.00
2000	279,049	134	0.05	0.02 ▲
2001	283,361	165	0.06	0.01 ▲
2002	286,575	179	0.06	0.00
2003	288,471	229	0.08	0.02 ▲
2004	290,570	292	0.10	0.02 ▲
2005	293,577	318	0.11	0.01 ▲
2006	299,891	340	0.11	0.00
2007	307,672	352	0.11	0.00
2008	315,459	373	0.12	0.01 ▲
2009	319,368	404	0.13	0.01 ▲
2010	317,630	373	0.12	0.01 ▼
2011	311,841	359	0.12	0.00
2012	313,182	405	0.13	0.01 ▲
2013	315,810	448	0.14	0.01 ▲
2014	319,718	460	0.15	0.01 ▲
2015	323,024	466	0.15	0.00
2016	326,036	458	0.14	0.01 ▼
2017	332,507	527	0.16	0.02 ▲
2018	342,183	538	0.16	0.00
2019	349,468	535	0.15	0.01 ▼
2020	354,042	601	0.17	0.02 ▲
2021	358,298	556	0.16	0.01 ▼
2022	364,917	556	0.15	0.01
2023	375,218	548	0.15	0.00 ▼
2024	383,726	558	0.15	0.00
2025	389,444	559	0.14	0.01
2026	394,324	569	0.14	0.00 ▲

Islamic Cultural Centre in Iceland (1 January)
Year	Population	Islamic Cultural Centre	%	±
2010	317,630	218	0.07	0.07 ▲
2011	311,841	268	0.09	0.02 ▲
2012	313,182	267	0.09	0.00
2013	315,810	300	0.09	0.00
2014	319,718	353	0.11	0.02 ▲
2015	323,024	381	0.12	0.01 ▲
2016	326,036	379	0.12	0.00
2017	332,507	397	0.12	0.00
2018	342,183	400	0.12	0.00
2019	349,468	389	0.11	0.01 ▼
2020	354,042	366	0.10	0.01 ▼
2021	358,298	440	0.12	0.02 ▲
2022	364,917	258	0.07	0.05 ▼
2023	375,218	407	0.11	0.04 ▲
2024	383,726	488	0.13	0.02 ▲
2025	389,444	584	0.15	0.02 ▲
2026	394,324	690	0.17	0.02 ▲

== See also ==
- Religion in Iceland
- Islam in the Arctic
- Islam in Europe
- Islam by country
- European Islam
- Bahá'í Faith in Iceland
- Iceland–Palestine relations
- Reykjavík Mosque
