= Tamimi (surname) =

Tamimi or Temimi (Arabic: التميمي, romanized: at-Tamīmī) is an Arabic surname that may refer to

- Abdeljelil Temimi (born 1938), Tunisian historian
  - Fondation Temimi pour la recherche scientifique et l'information, a Tunisian research institution founded by Abdeljelil
- Abdul Aziz bin Hars bin Asad Yemeni Tamimi (816–944), Muslim saint
- Abdulla Al-Tamimi (born 1994), squash player who represents Qatar
- Abu Al Fazal Abdul Wahid Yemeni Tamimi (842–1034), Yemeni Sufi saint
- Ahed Tamimi (born 2001), Palestinian activist
- Ahlam Tamimi (born 1980), Palestinian-Jordanian militant
- Al-Hurr ibn Yazid al Tamimi, 7th century military general
- Al-Qaqa ibn Amr al-Tamimi, 7th century Arab general
- Alaa al-Tamimi (born 1952), Mayor of Baghdad
- Al-Tamimi, the physician, 10th century Arab physician
- Ali al-Tamimi (born 1963), American biologist and Islamic teacher
- Amal Tamimi (born 1960), Icelandic-Palestinian feminist, social activist, and politician, sister of Salmann Tamimi
- Ammar Al-Tamimi (born 1988), squash player who represents Kuwait
- Asim ibn 'Amr al-Tamimi, 7th century military leader of Rashidun Caliphate
- Azzam Tamimi (born 1955), British-Palestinian academic and political activist
- Aymenn Jawad Al-Tamimi, British Islamic scholar
- Bassem al-Tamimi (born c. 1967), Palestinian activist
- Ibn Abi Ramtha al-Tamimi, 7th-century physician
- Janna Tamimi, commonly known as Janna Jihad, Palestinian youth activist and amateur journalist
- Jassim Al Tamimi (born 1971), Qatari football midfielder
- Jonathan Tamimi (born 1994), Swedish football player
- Khazim ibn Khuzayma al-Tamimi (fl. 749–768), Khurasani Arab military leader
- Majed Al-Tamimi (born 1971), Saudi Arabian sport shooter
- Mohammed ibn Qasim al-Tamimi (1140/5-1207/8), Moroccan hadith
- Muhammad ibn Sa'id al-Tamimi (died 990), Palestinian physician
- Muhammed ibn Umail al-Tamimi, 10th century alchemist
- Munzir ibn Sawa Al Tamimi, 7th century governor of the Persian Sasanian Empire
- Musa ibn Ka'b al-Tamimi, 8th-century Arab commander
- Rafiq al-Tamimi (1889–1957), Palestinian Arab educator and political figure
- Salmann Tamimi (born 1955), Icelandic-Palestinian Muslim, brother of Amal Tamimi
- Sami Tamimi, Palestinian chef
- Shihab al-Tamimi (died 2008), Iraqi journalist
- Taissir Tamimi, chief Islamic judge of the Palestinian National Authority
- Ya'qub ibn Ishaq al-Tamimi, 10th century naval commander
- Essam Al Tamimi, Founder and Chairman of Al Tamimi & Company

== See also ==
- Tamim (name)
