= 2013 Hawija clashes =

Violence in northern Iraq during the post-U.S. insurgency

- Part of the Iraqi insurgency and the 2012–2013 Iraqi protests
Date	23 April 2013 – 26 April 2013 (3 days)
Location	Initial clashes in Hawija, Kirkuk Governorate, later spread to central and northern Iraq
Result	Iraqi Insurgents briefly take over the town of Sulaiman Bek on 25 April; Iraqi Army imposes curfew in Diyala and Anbar Governorates; Iraqi government bans 10 TV stations (incl. Al Jazeera) from broadcasting on 29 April; Karameh Border Crossing temporarily closed on 30 April

Belligerents
Naqshbandi Army	(Iraq) Iraqi Government; Kurdistan Region

Commanders and leaders
Izzat Ibrahim al-Douri	(Iraq) Nouri al-Maliki (Iraq) Babaker Shawkat B. Zebari (Kurdistan Region) Massoud Barzani (Iraq) Ahmad Abu Risha

Units involved
Naqshbandi Army; Intifada Ahrar al-Iraq	Iraqi Armed Forces; Iraqi Army; Iraqi Air Force; Iraqi Police; Al-Sahwa militia; (Kurdistan Region) Peshmerga

Strength
Naqshbandi Army: 1,500–5,000	Iraqi Army: ~300,000; Iraqi Police: ~300,000; Peshmerga: ~200,000; Sons of Iraq: 30,000 (June 2012)

Casualties and losses
	51 soldiers killed, 62+ injured 38 policemen killed, 41+ injured 6 Sahwa members killed, 1 injured
- 111+ killed on 23 April (42 in Hawija); 86+ killed on 24 April; 96+ killed on 25 April; 38+ killed on 26 April; Total casualty toll (23 – 26 Apr): 330+ killed, ~600 injured

The 2013 Hawija clashes relate to a series of violent attacks within Iraq, as part of the 2012–2013 Iraqi protests and Iraqi insurgency (2011–2013). On 23 April, an army raid against a protest encampment in the city of Hawija, west of Kirkuk, led to dozens of civilian deaths and the involvement of several insurgent groups in organized action against the government, leading to fears of a return to a wide-scale Sunni–Shia conflict within the country. By 27 April, more than 300 people were reported killed and scores more injured in one of the worst outbreaks of violence since the U.S. withdrawal in December 2011.

== Background ==
Violence in Iraq has decreased since its peak in 2006–07, but attacks remain common. Deaths rose in 2012 for the first time in three years.

In the months leading up to the 20 April provincial elections, the first since the withdrawal of US forces in 2011, tensions were high in Iraq as Sunni groups claimed they were being marginalized by Prime Minister Nouri al-Maliki's Shiite dominated government. A number of large scale attacks linked to the Salafist umbrella group Islamic State of Iraq and the Levant were carried out in early 2013 in an attempt to destabilize the country ahead of the elections. At least fourteen election candidates were murdered, while Anbar and Nineveh Governorates postponed elections because of security concerns. Four other governorates did not hold elections on 20 April.

== Timeline ==
=== Hawija protests ===
On Friday 19 April a group of protesters marched toward an Iraqi Army checkpoint in Hawija, a town west of Kirkuk, sparking a violent confrontation in which one civilian and one Iraqi officer were killed. Following the refusal of residents to hand the suspects over to security forces, Hawija was put under siege. Government sources reported the protesters had stolen some weapons from the checkpoint after the attack took place.

On 23 April, Iraqi Army units moved against the encampment set up by protesters in Hawija, sparking deadly clashes and reprisal attacks across the country. According to army officers, the operation began shortly before dawn and was aimed at Sunni militants from the Naqshbandi Army, who were reportedly involved in the protest movement. Army officials said their forces only opened fire after being fired upon, and they confiscated at least 34 Kalashnikov assault rifles and 4 PKM machineguns after the clashes had ended. A total of 42 people were killed and at least 153 others injured, with most of them being protesters; only 3 soldiers were confirmed dead and 7 others wounded. United Nations spokeswoman in Iraq, Eliana Nabaa, confirmed there were many casualties. The organizers behind the protests disputed the Army's account of events and accused them of killing and injuring innocent people. According to Abdulmalik al-Juburi, one of the leaders of the Hawija movement, Army units "burned the tents and opened fire indiscriminately and killed and wounded dozens of protesters". He also denied harboring any wanted criminals and said there was only four rifles used to protect the whole gathering, placing the official military report under question. After news of the assault broke, several checkpoints around Kirkuk were attacked by groups of armed gunmen, and at least 13 of them were killed by security forces. Unidentified assailants attacked a checkpoint near Ramadi, killing 6 soldiers and kidnapping another, while setting fire to the building and two armored vehicles. An additional attack took place near Sulaiman Bek in Saladin Governorate, where six soldiers and a gunman were killed, while 11 soldiers and six attackers were left injured. Attacks against three checkpoints on the road to Tikrit left 9 police officers dead and 5 others injured. Four bodies were found dumped in Fallujah and one in Iskandariya, while an IED attack in Baaj killed a soldier and injured two others. Four soldiers were wounded in a shooting near Al-Karmah, while in Haswa gunmen stormed a Sahwa militia member's home, killing five members of his family. Army units cut off-road access to Kirkuk in the evening, as a curfew came into effect for the region. On the same day, at least 13 others were killed and 25 injured as they left Sunni mosques in Baghdad and Diyala Governorate. A bomb in Mosul killed a policeman and injured another, while mortars killed 9 and wounded 25 in Muqdadiyah. In addition, the Minister of Education Mohammed Tamim resigned from his post in response to the Army's operation, and was followed later by Science and Technology Minister Abd al-Karim al-Samarrai. Samarrai is part of the Renewal List, while Tamim is a member of the Iraqi National Dialogue Front and was born in Hawija.

=== Attacks spread out ===
Location of Hawija, site of the initial shootings

Violent attacks grew in number and scope on 24 April, as protesters and insurgents forces attacked government installations and personnel across the country. In Sulaiman Bek, north of the capital Baghdad, clashes left 7 gunmen and 5 policemen dead and 63 others injured, including at least 20 soldiers. Helicopters belonging to the Iraqi Air Force were used to bomb several locations in and around the town, injuring 'dozens' of civilians, according to local officials. In addition, a bomb attack against a police patrol left an officer and 3 of his bodyguards dead and wounded another. Following the clashes in Sulaiman Bek the Iraqi Army withdrew from the town, with an Iraqi Army officer claiming the move was to allow for civilians to leave the town before the army began a counter-offensive. A shooting in nearby Tuz Khormato killed one policeman and seven insurgents, while another three officers were injured.

A roadside bomb killed two soldiers and injured five others in Baiji, where clashes later claimed 19 casualties, though government officials did not specify how many were killed and how many wounded in the fighting. Sunni tribesmen reportedly blocked the roads going into Qara Tappah, 120 km northeast of Baghdad. After Iraqi Army units came in to clear the barricades, fighting broke out in which 7 soldiers and 15 gunmen were reported killed. In Mosul three gunmen were killed while attacking a checkpoint, while various shootings left a policeman and a soldier dead, and another officer and a doctor wounded. Continued clashes in and around Hawija killed a total of 12 security personnel and attackers. Unidentified gunmen attacked a Sahwa militia checkpoint in Khales, killing four militiamen and injuring a civilian. In the eastern Baghdad district of Al-Husseiniyah, a car bomb was detonated near a mobile phone market, killing at least 8 civilians and injuring 21 others. Another car bombing killed three and wounded seven in Tarmiyah, north of the capital. Three police officers were wounded in an ambush near Fallujah, while mortar fire injured three civilians inside the city. A rocket attack in Tikrit killed one soldier and wounded two others. Meanwhile, anti-government protesters near Ramadi released two soldiers that had been captured the previous day. The Iraqi government announced a commission to investigate the previous day's incidents, that is to be led by Deputy Prime Minister Saleh al-Mutlaq.

On 25 April violence appeared to escalate, as Prime Minister al-Maliki appeared on national TV and read a statement, warning of sectarian war and blaming "remnants of Baath Party" for the recent events. Heavy fighting broke out in the western parts of Mosul, where insurgents used mosque loudspeakers to urge fellow Sunnis to join the fight, before overrunning a police compound and taking 17 hostages. At least 31 unidentified gunmen and 15 policemen were reported killed in the fighting, which lasted throughout the day and forced residents to hide in their homes until the late evening, when the government forces retook control.

Local morgues reported another 6 police officers were injured in clashes across the city, although the numbers were likely to be higher. In a separate attack, gunmen stormed into a policeman's home and killed four members of his family. Heavy fighting between local tribesmen and the Iraqi Army in Saidiyah left 7 soldiers and 12 gunmen dead, while a total of 25 others were injured. Local sources reported a helicopters crashing and at least two vehicles being burnt by attackers. Attacks were reported from the south as well, including a car bomb next to a bus stop in Najaf that killed four civilians and injured 22 others. A bomb in Jurf-al-Shakhar killed four soldiers and injured four others. Clashes were again reported from Fallujah, though the full extent of casualties was not immediately known. At least two Sahwa militiamen were killed, along with two police officers, while two civilians were injured. Fighting continued in Qara Tappah, where four gunmen were killed and nine civilians injured. At least 8 gunmen and 2 policemen were killed in attacks against checkpoints in Hawija, Samarrah and Kafak. Five attackers and four officers were also injured in those incidents. Heavy fighting was reported from Sulaiman Bek, where the Naqshbandi Army appeared to be in control, although no casualty figures were released. A similar situation was present in Baqubah, where residents were placed under a strict curfew by local authorities. A soldiers was shot dead in Tikrit, while two police officers were injured by mortar fire in Yathrib. Gunmen briefly took over two checkpoint in Ad-Dawr and Qayara, while an oil pipeline was damaged in an explosion near Shirqat.

Violent incidents continued at a high pace across the country on 26 April, although many reports did not include detailed casualty counts, as in the day before. Insurgents withdrew from Sulaiman Bek after negotiations with local tribesmen, allowing the Iraqi Army to re-enter the town. The capital Baghdad was the scene of a number of bombings, most of them targeting Sunni civilians. Four blasts near mosques in Doura, Rashidiya and Shabb killed 12 and injured 61 others. A motorcycle bomb exploded next to a falafel shop in Sadr City, killing 5 and wounding 19. Later in the day, a car bomb killed 7 and wounded 13 at a shopping center in the city's south. A roadside bombing killed 4 soldiers and injured another near Mahmoudiya, while five bodies were brought to the morgue in Tuz Khormato. Gunmen shot dead five people in and around Tikrit. A bombing outside a tailor shop in Wadi Hajar wounded 12 civilians, while an IED blast injured another in Saidiyah. Clashes were once more reported from Fallujah, where a policeman and a civilian were injured by gunfire. Fighting was also reported in Haditha and Kubaisa.

=== Aftermath ===
The number of attacks appeared to be lower on 27 April; as Prime Minister al-Maliki blamed the unrest on regional issues and authorities imposed a 9 pm to 4 am curfew in Al Anbar Governorate in an effort to quell the violence. Five intelligence officers were killed and two gunmen wounded in a firefight near a protesters' camp in Ramadi. Two policemen were also injured in the attack, which allegedly took place after the officers were seen filming the camp. Two bodyguards were injured in a failed assassination attempt against a police official just outside the city. Four soldiers were killed and seven others injured in a firefight in Abu Ghraib, while three civilians were shot dead in separate attacks in the southern port of Basra. Fresh fighting was reported from Fallujah, where insurgents attacked a football team, killing one player and injuring another. Mortar fire wounded four civilians inside the city. Clashes were also reported from Baiji and Baqubah, where 2 gunmen were killed and 10 others arrested. Kurdish government officials deployed Peshmerga troops in and around Kirkuk to prevent further bloodshed in a move criticized by the cabinet in Baghdad. Staff General Ali Ghaidan Majeed, the commander of Iraqi ground forces, called it a "dangerous development" and an apparent attempt to reach the area's large oilfields.

The nightly curfew and response operations of the government's security forces appeared to ease tensions a bit, as casualties continued to fall in the days following the original clash, while attacks began to shift back to their usual pattern of large bombings and isolated shootings. On 28 April, a car bomb killed 3 policemen and injured 3 others in Taji, while gunmen killed a soldier and injured 3 others in Hammam-al-Ali. Unidentified assailants also killed 2 civilians and injured another in separate attacks in Mosul and Fallujah. Meanwhile, the Iraqi government revoked the broadcasting licenses of ten satellite television stations for "inciting sectarian unrest". Among the channels affected was the Qatari-based Al Jazeera, as well as Al Sharqiya and al-Shariqya News, two frequent critics of the Maliki cabinet. Iraq's media commission accused the stations of misleading reports and "clear calls for disorder and for launching retaliatory criminal attacks against security forces". A statement from Al Jazeera expressed dismay at the move and called on the government to "uphold freedom for the media to report the important stories taking place in Iraq". Casualties rose on 29 April, as most of the attacks turned to cities in Iraq's south, killing a total of 47 people and injuring at least 100 others. Twin car bombs killed 18 and injured 42 others in Amarah, while two others killed 12 and injured 37 in Karbala and Diwaniyah. Another blast in a Shi'ite district of the mostly-Sunni city of Mahmoudiyah killed 6 and left 14 wounded. Armed clashes also continued in the north, where gunmen killed 3 soldiers and injured 3 others in Mosul. A civilian was killed and his brother injured in a separate attack within the city. Similar attacks in Yathrib, Salman Pak and Riyadh left 5 soldiers and a policeman dead, and 3 other soldiers injured. A prominent lawyer was assassinated in Baqubah, while mortar strikes were reported near Baghdad International Airport.

At least 16 people were killed and 46 wounded in scattered attacks across the country on 30 April, though most of them appeared to be small bombings, rather than the heavy clashes with security forces that rocked Iraq in the previous week. Three bombings took place in Baghdad, including one at a Sunni mosque, killing a total of 7 civilians and injuring 27 others. A suicide bomber killed 2 and injured 5 others in Sulaiman Bek, while a protest organizer was assassinated in Haditha. Roadside blasts occurred in Mosul, Baqubah, Baiji, Zaidan and Kirkuk, killing a total of 5 people - two policemen, two Peshmerga troops, and a civilian. At least eleven others were injured in these incidents. Gunmen killed a civilian in Taji and injured three soldiers in Qayyarah. Meanwhile, the Iraqi government announced the temporary closure of the Karameh Border Crossing with Jordan near Trebil due to ongoing security concerns in the western Anbar Governorate. The border point is seen as a vital economic interest of the province, and the move was expected to have a significant impact on businesses and markets.

Attacks were focused on the central parts of Iraq on 1 May, including a pair of bombings in Al-Karmah that killed a Sahwa member and injured at least 16 other militiamen. A suicide bomber killed six east of Fallujah, while another blast and a shooting inside the city left three soldiers and a policeman dead and another officer injured. Four policemen died in a roadside bombing in Baiji, while two others were killed in twin bombings in Ramadi. At least thirteen others were injured in those incidents, including 3 officers. Bombings and shootings in Baqubah killed three, including a local cleric, and injured 11 others. Roadside bombings killed a soldier and injured four civilians in Kanaan and Tal Afar. Similar attacks injured five others in Kirkuk and Jalawla. In the capital Baghdad a bomb blast ripped through the Husseiniya neighborhood, killing 4 and injuring 12 others. At nearby Abu Ghraib mortar fire injured at least 11 civilians. Despite the overall reduction in violence, at least 25 were killed and 73 injured during the day—figures much higher than the average daily death toll before the Hawija clashes on 23 April. These dropped on 2 May, when only 12 killed and 23 injured were reported from across the country, most of them members of the security forces. Clashes in Mosul killed three, while a political candidate was assassinated in the city as well. A suicide bomber killed a captain and injured 4 soldiers in Abu Faraj, and a bombing killed 2 soldiers and injured another in Yusufiya. The chief of police for Kirkuk Governorate escaped an assassination attempt, which injured four policemen guarding him. Roadside blasts killed 2 civilians and injured 6 others in Baqubah and Ramadi. Gunmen injured 4 policemen in Numaniya, while 2 others were injured and one killed in a bombing in Karbala. A Katuysha rocket attack near Abu Ghraib killed one soldiers and injured 2 others.

On 3 May, a bomb was detonated at the Rashidiyah mosque in Baghdad, killing 7 people, including one of the clerics. An additional 31 were injured in the blast, which took place as worshippers left the building after Friday prayers. A car bomb killed 4 policemen and injured 3 civilians near Ramadi, while a police captain was killed in Baiji. Seven others were injured after bombings in Taji and Muqdadiyah, including 3 officers. Despite the overall drop in violence across most of Iraq since the 23 April incidents, heavy clashes continued in the northern city of Mosul. At least 10 policemen were killed and 10 others injured in several shootings, mortar strikes and a roadside bombing. Meanwhile, the United Nations mission to Iraq released figures, showing that more people died in violent attacks in April than in any other month since June 2008. According to the numbers, at least 712 were killed during April, including 117 members of the security forces.

== Reactions ==
=== Domestic ===
- The Prime Minister of Iraq Nouri al-Maliki appealed for calm in a statement released on 27 April, and added that sectarian strife had returned to Iraq from elsewhere in the region, saying "Sectarianism is evil, and the wind of sectarianism does not need a licence to cross from a country to another, because if it begins in a place, it will move to another place. ... Strife is knocking on the doors of everyone, and no one will survive if it enters, because there is a wind behind it, and money, and plans".
- (Iraq) A statement released by the Naqshbandi Army claimed responsibility for a number of attacks in the aftermath of the Hawija shootings and urged fighters across the country to prepare to storm Baghdad "to confront with an iron fist ... the enemies of Arabism and Islam".

=== International ===
- United Nations – A statement by Martin Kobler, the UN Special Representative for Iraq, condemned the violence and appealed for calm, calling on the "conscience of all religious and political leaders not to let anger win over peace, and to use their wisdom, because the country is at a crossroads".

== See also ==
- 2012–2013 Iraqi protests
- List of terrorist incidents, January–June 2013
