= Tamim =

Tamim (Arabic: تميم) may refer to

- Tamim al-Dari a companion of Muhammad and an early convert from Christianity to Islam.
- Tamim bin Hamad Al Thani, Emir of Qatar
- Tamim Iqbal, Bangladeshi cricketer
- Tamim (Chabad), a student or alumni of the Tomchei Temimim yeshiva network
- Tamim (name)
- Tamim (cricketer), Afghan cricketer
- Banu Tamim, one of the main tribes of Arabia
- Hotat Bani Tamim, a Saudi Arabian town

== See also ==
- Tamimi (disambiguation)
