= Tamimi (disambiguation) =

Tamimi (Arabic: التميمي) is a clan of the Arab tribe Banu Tamim. Tamimi or Temimi may also refer to

- Tamimi (surname)
- Tamimi Group of Saudi Arabian companies

== See also ==
- Tamim (disambiguation)
