= Sarpidons saga sterka =

Sarpidons saga sterka ('the saga of Sarpidon the Strong', also known as Sagan af Sarpidon konungi og köppum hans, 'the saga of King Sarpidon and his champions') is an Icelandic romance-saga by the priest Jón Oddsson Hjaltalín (1749–1835). The protagonist shares his name with a number of heroes of Ancient Greek epic.

== Summary ==
The saga recounts the deeds of the son of an earl from Hungary. He is brought up according to heathen customs, but has to flee his people for destroying their wooden idols. Many adventures follow, testing the strength of the young hero. Eventually, he becomes king of Portugal. Inter alia, the saga mentions the 1755 Lisbon Earthquake. A fuller summary is provided by Matthew Driscoll.

== Editions ==
- Bjarni Vilhjálmsson (ed.), Riddarasögur, 6 vols (Reykjavík: Íslendingasagnaútgáfan, 1949–1951), VI, 239-309 (from MSS Lbs 2943 4to and Lbs 1502 4to).

== Manuscripts ==
- Milton S. Eisenhower Library, Johns Hopkins University, Baltimore, Icelandic Collection, MS no. 26 (mid-nineteenth-century)
- Bragi Húnfjörð, MS no. 1 in 4to (1883, Friðrik Jónsson, Rifgirðingar)
- Reykjavík, National Library, Lbs 2943 4to (1885, Magnús Jónsson í Tjaldanesi, Tjaldanes)
- Reykjavík, National Library, Lbs 1502 4to (1902, Magnús Jónsson í Tjaldanesi, Tjaldanes)
- Böðvar Kvaran (1912, Magnús Jónsson í Tjaldanesi, Tjaldanes)
