= Tamim (name) =

Tamim (Latin: Tamim, Arabic: تميم, romanized: Tamīm) is a Latin and Arabic name that may refer to

== Given name ==
- Tamim al-Ansari, Muslim saint
- Tamim al-Barghouti (born 1977), Palestinian poet, columnist and political scientist
- Tamim al-Dari (died 661), companion of the Islamic prophet Muhammad
- Tamim bin Hamad Al Thani (born 1980), Emir of Qatar
- Tamim ibn al-Mu'izz (1031–1108), ruler of the Zirids in Ifriqiya
- Tamim Ansary (born 1948), Afghan-American author and public speaker
- Tamim Bashir (1984/85–2004), Bangladeshi cricketer
- Tamim Chowdhury (1986–2016), Bangladeshi-Canadian Islamist
- Tamim Iqbal (born 1989), Bangladeshi cricketer

== Surname ==
- Dhahi Khalfan Tamim (born 1951), Head of General Security for the Emirate of Dubai and former Police Commissioner
- Dunash ibn Tamim, 10th century Jewish scholar
- Mohammad Tamim Nuristani (born 1962), businessman and politician from Afghanistan
- Mohamad Siraj Tamim (born 1985), Lebanese sprinter
- Mohammed Tamim (born 1958), Moroccan architect, economist, and francophone writer
- Suzanne Tamim (1977–2008), Lebanese singer murdered in Dubai

== See also ==
- Tamimi (surname)
