= Salmann Tamimi =

- سلمان التميمي
- Born: March 1, 1955; Jerusalem, Jordan
- Died: December 2, 2020 (aged 65); Iceland
- Spouse: Ingibjörg Tamimi Sigurjónsdóttir
- Children: 5
- Relatives: Amal Tamimi

Salmann (Suleiman) Tamimi (Arabic: سلمان التميمي; 1 March 1955 – 2 December 2020) was a founding member of the Association Iceland-Palestine (Icelandic: Félagið Ísland-Palestína) and the Association of Muslims in Iceland (Icelandic: Félag múslima á Íslandi).

== Biography ==
Salmann was born in 1955 in the West Bank and grew up in Wadi El Joz in east Jerusalem. His father was Salim (Saleem) Abu Khaled al Tamimi, a businessman and passionate activist, and his mother Salim's second wife Nazima abu Rajabb al Tamimi; his elder siblings are, in order of age, Younes, Rawda, Safah, Amneh, along with his younger sister Amal. Younes moved to Iceland in 1966, Amneh some years later (but moved back to Jerusalem), and Salmann in 1971, at the age of sixteen. He had been travelling to the US but stopped over in Iceland to see his brother Younes and decided to stay.

Salmann's first partner was Þórstína Björg Þorsteinsdóttir, with whom he had María Björg Tamimi and Nadia Tamimi. In the mid-1980s, he married Ingibjörg Sigurjónsdóttir, with whom he had Yousef Ingi Tamimi, Rakel Dögg Tamimi and Nazima Kristín Tamimi; the couple have five children together.

Salmann worked as a sailor and in construction before completing his studies in computer science at the University of Iceland. He then worked for Iceland's national hospital but was dismissed in 2006. In 2012, the Supreme Court of Iceland found that his dismissal was illegal.

In the later 1970s and 1990s, Salmann lived in Sweden. He now lives in Breiðholt in Reykjavík.

== Family conflict ==
Salmann assisted his sister Amal and her children to move to Iceland in 1995, where Amal became the second foreign-born person (and the first foreign-born woman) to sit in the Icelandic parliament. Later, Amal accused Salmann to disown her over her partnership with an Icelandic man. According to Amal, Salmann tried to persuade Icelandic authorities to have her judged as an unfit mother. Amal claims that Salmann felt her daughters were not safe in her home because of her relationship with a Christian man. However, this has been disputed. Although Amal did start relationship with Icelandic man, the man was Salman’s former son-in-law, which resulted in Salman disowning her. In 2014, Amal said that she and Salmann are not on speaking terms.

== Political life ==
In 1987, Salmann founded the Association Iceland-Palestine (Félagið Ísland-Palestína). On 24 July 2014, Salmann made the headlines in Iceland for his comment on Israel at a Jerusalem Post news article about the funeral of Israeli soldiers: "To hell inshallah. Your friends will follow u. Victory to Hamas and Jihad Islami." Many condemned his remarks.

In the 2014 municipal elections, Salmann was a candidate for Dögun. Salmann, however, has close ties with Björk Vilhelmsdóttir, a prominent member of the Social Democratic Alliance. Björk is married to Sveinn Rúnar Hauksson, chairman of the Association Iceland-Palestine.

== Religious life ==
In 1997, Salmann founded the Association of Muslims in Iceland (Félag múslima á Íslandi), being succeeded as its chair in 2010 by Ibrahim Sverrir Agnarsson. The Association of Muslims in Iceland has a mosque in Ármúli in Reykjavík, where Salmann is one of two imams.

Since founding the Association of Muslims in Iceland Salmann has become one of the foremost spokesmen for Muslims in Iceland, making numerous media appearances both in Iceland and abroad. One issue on which he had a prominent role was the building of a new mosque in Reykjavik. In 2010, Salmann said that the Association of Muslims in Iceland would never raise funds abroad to build a mosque; by accepting funds abroad one jeopardised losing the reins of control. His successor, however, said that funds for the mosque would be raised abroad, including Muslims in Kuwait and the United Arab Emirates.

=== Position on Sharia law ===
In a radio programme on 28 May 2014, Salmann expressed the view that thieves should have their hands cut off. When his comments caused an outrage Salmann insisted that he had not meant what he said. Salmann made news when he proposed to bring charges for hate-speech against some of the people who had made personal comments about him in this connection. However, in a television interview on 18 June 2014 Salmann reiterated that he supported amputation as a punishment for theft, just as murderers deserve the death penalty, unless "the family of the deceased does not forgive them".

=== Attitude towards women and homosexuality ===
In a television interview on 18 June 2014, Salmann discussed the role of men and women. The wife can be "the head of the family", because in most cases, she raises the children and controls their dietary habits, whilst it can be demanding for a man to be "the head of the family", especially when they would have to "take care of his wife from A–Z". In the same interview, Salmann explained that a Muslim can't be homosexual, the religion does not allow that. He said he wouldn't deny a same-sex matrimony in his congregation, even though homosexuality is considered a sin in Islam, as it is in other religions. He also explained that, according to the Qur'an, homosexuality is not a deadly sin, as other people had stated before, that the Qur'an explains that homosexuals should be "reasoned with and directed to the right path".

=== Naming committee incident ===
The Tamimi's requested to have the spelling of their name changed from Tamimi to Tamímí since that corresponds more precisely with spelling in the language but the naming committee rejected the applications saying there was no permission in the naming laws to make any changes at all to surnames.

== Death ==
Tamimi died at his home on 3 December 2020.

== See also ==
- Islam in Iceland
- Reykjavík Mosque
- Iceland–Palestine relations
