= Supreme Command for Jihad and Liberation =

Iraqi insurgent nationalist alliance

- القيادة العليا للجهاد والتحرير
- Leader: Izzat Ibrahim al-Douri
- Dates active: 3 October 2007 – 2014
- Country: Iraq
- Allegiance: Ba'athist Iraq; Arab Socialist Ba'ath Party – Iraq Region
- Active regions: Iraq, Sunni Triangle
- Ideology: Ba'athism; Saddamism; Iraqi nationalism Arab nationalism Arab-Islamic nationalism Sunni Islamism
- Size: 1,000+
- Wars: the Iraq War

The Supreme Command for Jihad and Liberation (a.k.a. Supreme Council of Jihad and Liberation or SCJL or Ba'athist Loyalists) was an Iraqi front comprising some 23 militia groups formed on 3 October 2007 and were led by former Iraqi vice president and deputy chairman of the Revolutionary Command Council Izzat Ibrahim al-Douri. The name is also often used to refer to the largest militia in the front, the Army of the Men of the Naqshbandi Order (also known by its Arabic initials JRTN), which was commanded by Douri himself.

The formation of the coalition was announced on 3 October 2007 in a videotaped message broadcast on the Arab satellite television channel Al Arabiya and in a statement posted on a Ba'athist website.

== Ideology ==
The group laid down a series of eight terms and conditions in order for negotiations with U.S. forces to take place:

1. Officially recognize the patriotic Resistance and all the patriotic, Arab nationalist, and Islamist Resistance organizations in all their armed and civil organizations as the sole legitimate representative of Iraq and its people.
2. Officially announce an unconditional withdrawal from Iraq – whether that be immediate or in short stages.
3. Halt raids, pursuits, killings, destruction, sabotage, dispossession, and expulsions and withdraw the occupation troops from all population centers.
4. Free all prisoners and detainees without exception and compensate them for their losses.
5. Return to service the Iraqi Army and national security forces, which were declared dissolved by the Americans during their invasion in 2003. They are to be restored in keeping with the rules and traditions that were in force before the American invasion and they must also be compensated for their losses.
6. Pledge to compensate Iraq for all the material and moral losses and injuries caused the country by the occupation.
7. Cancel all laws, decrees, and other pieces of legislation issued after the occupation.
8. Hold direct talks with the Resistance on implementing a program to fulfill the principles adhered to by the Supreme Command.

== Leadership ==
In addition to naming ad-Douri head of the group, the Supreme Command for Jihad and Liberation also appointed several others to its general staff:

- Lieutenant General 'Amir Muhammad Amin (Deputy Supreme Commander for Military Affairs)
- Shaykh 'Ali 'Abdallah al-'Ubaydi (Head of Religious Consultation Body)
- General Khalid Sulayman Khalaf (Head of National Security Board)
- Lieutenant General Muhammad Salig 'Alwan (Head of Board for Administrative and Financial Affairs)
- General Salah ad-Din Ahmad (Head of Board for Information and Mobilization)
- Dr. Kan'an Amin (Official Spokesman)

== Included groups ==
The Supreme Command for Jihad and Liberation is made up of 23 resistance groups. The coalition is led by a Sufi Muslim group – "The Army of the Men of the Naqshbandi Order." Ad-Douri is said to have ascribed to Sufism, a mystical form of Islam, in his later years.

The 23 named groups include:

1. The Army of the Men of the Naqshbandi Order
2. The Army of the Prophet's Companions (Jaish al-Sahaba)
3. The Army of the Murabiteen (Jaish al-Murabiteen)
4. The Army of al-Hamzah (Jaish al-Hamzah)
5. The Army of the Message (Jaish al-Risala)
6. The Army of Ibn al-Walid (Jaish Ibn al-Walid)
7. The United Command of the Mujahideen in Iraq
8. The Liberation Brigades (Kataeb al-Tahrir)
9. The Army of al-Mustafa (Jaish al-Mustafa)
10. The Army of the Liberation of Iraq (Jaish Tahrir Iraq)
11. Squadrons of the Martyrs (Saraya al-Shuhada)
12. The Army of the Sabireen (Jaish al-Sabireen)
13. The Brigades of the Jihad in the Land of the Two Rivers
14. The Army of the Knight for the Liberation of the Self-Rule Area
15. Squadrons of the Jihad in Basra (Saraya al-Jihad al-Basrah)
16. Jihadist Squadrons of Fallujah (Saraya al-Falluja al-Jihadiya)
17. The Patriotic Popular Front for the Liberation of Iraq
18. The Squadrons of the Husayni Revolution of at-Taff (Saraya Altaf al-Husayni)
19. Squadrons of the Liberation of the South (Saraya Tahrir al-Junoob)
20. Army of Haneen (Jaish al-Haneen)
21. Squadrons of Diyala for Jihad and Liberation
22. The Squadrons of Glory for the Liberation of Iraq

== See also ==
- List of armed groups in the Iraqi Civil War
