= Jón Oddsson Hjaltalín =

Icelandic priest and writer (1749–1835)

Jón Oddsson Hjaltalín (1749 – 25 December 1835) was an Icelandic priest and writer. He composed verse and prose, and his writing was influenced by Icelandic tradition, Christian learning, and Enlightenment thought.

== Biography ==
Jón graduated from Skálholtsskóli in 1776 and became a priest at Háls in Hamarsfjörður 7 April 1777. He then took up the ministry at Kálfafell on 12 July 1780, before proceeding to Hvammur in Norðurárdalur on 9 June 1783. Then, in 1786, he moved to Saurbær in Hvalfjarðarströnd 1786. He finished his career by taking up the ministry at Breiðabólstaður in Skógarströnd 1811, where he remained before retiring on 1 February 1835. During this time, he was also offered the position at Helgafell, but chose not to accept it.

Jón was noted for his achievements in many fields, and today is best known for his many songs, psalms, rímur and sagas.

The main biographical study of Jón is by Matthew James Driscoll.

== Works ==
In Jón's own lifetime, his work circulated mostly in manuscript, and printed editions came only later.

=== Romances ===
- Fimmbræðra saga
- Sagan af Bernótus Borneyjarkappa
- Sagan af Hinriki heilráða
- Sagan af Ketlerus keisaraefni
- Sagan af Mána fróða
- Sagan af Marroni sterka
- Sagan af Natoni persíska
- Sagan af Reimari keisara og Fal hinum sterka
- Sagan af Rígabal og Alkanusi
- Sarpidons saga sterka

=== Other prose ===
- Summary of Heiðarvíga saga
- Sagan af Zadig (an adaptation of Voltaire's Zadig)

=== Verse ===
- Níutíu og þrír Hugvekju Sálmar útaf Stúrms Hugvekna 1sta Parti frá Veturnóttum til Lángaføstu og til vissra tíma (Copenhagen, 1835)
- Bæna- og Sálma-Kver: sem inniheldur Fimm viku-kvöld-bænir (Akureyri: Grímur Laxdal, 1853)
- Sálmar og ljóð (Reykjavík: s.n., 1934)
