= Ibrahim Sverrir Agnarsson =

Icelandic Islamic activist

Ibrahim Sverrir Agnarsson (born 1948) was the chair of the Muslim Association of Iceland from 2010 to 2015.

== Biography ==
Ibrahim Sverrir was born in 1948. In 1973 he married María Harðardóttir; they have two sons.

Ibrahim Sverrir encountered Islam while living as a hippy and working as a horse-trainer for Spaghetti Westerns in Almería in Spain in 1970. Living in an Arab castle, he became interested in the inscriptions on the walls. He travelled to Istanbul, on to Peshawar, bought a horse there and spent some months riding in the mountains of Afghanistan, Pakistan, and China. During this period he converted to Islam. Ibrahim Sverrir has lived and travelled widely in the Islamic world, including working for the Libyan Ministry of Agriculture consulting on sheep-breeding.

In March 2017 he was convicted for tax evasion.

== Religious and political life ==
As the chair of the Association of Muslims in Iceland Ibrahim Sverrir has been prominent in bringing about the first purpose-built mosque in Iceland. According to Ibrahim Sverrir funds for the mosque will be raised abroad, including Muslims in Kuwait and the United Arab Emirates. Salmann Tamimi, however, has warned that by accepting funds abroad the Association of Muslims in Iceland will jeopardise losing the reins of control.

Ibrahim Sverrir and his predecessor also have divided opinions on the establishment of special schools for Muslim children. Ibrahim Sverrir has said that he's not against special schools for Muslim children provided that the national curriculum is observed. Salmann Tamimi, however, has said that he opposes special schools for Muslim children; in his opinion special schools would keep Muslim children from adjusting to Icelandic society.

In a radio interview on 26 November 2014 Ibrahim Sverrir targeted Saudi Arabia; describing it as "a primitive society".

== Views ==
=== Position on Sharia ===
In a radio interview on 2 June 2014 Ibrahim Sverrir said that members of the Association of Muslims in Iceland wanted certain affairs to be governed by Sharia, including inheritance and family matters.

=== Attitude towards gay people ===
In a radio interview on 6 August 2014 Ibrahim Sverrir answered questions on the status of gay people within Islam. Ibrahim Sverrir said that those that are for gay marriages could never rally support among Muslims in Iceland. From his perspective, the question was whether gay people could adjust to Islam. Nevertheless, he accepted that inevitably Muslims in Iceland would have to address the issue of gay marriages.

== See also ==
- Islam in Iceland
