= Army of the Men of the Naqshbandi Order =

Islamic and pan-Arabist armed organization in Iraq

- جيش رجال الطريقة النقشبندية
- The emblem of the JRTN. Text within the parentheses reads "A Victory from Allah and an Imminent Conquest". Bottom text reads "Army of the Men of the Naqshbandi Order"
- Leaders: Izzat Ibrahim al-Douri # (founder, 2006–2020)
- Dates active: 30 December 2006 – present
- Country: Iraq
- Allegiance: Ba'athist Iraq; Ba'ath Party (Iraqi-dominated faction)
- Group: Intifada Ahrar al-Iraq (2012-14)
- Active regions: Northwestern and western Iraq; Sunni Triangle; Baghdad Belts
- Ideology: Ba'athism; Saddamism; Iraqi nationalism Arab nationalism Arab-Islamic nationalism Pan-Arabism; Sunni Islamism
- Size: 5,000 volunteers (2011)
- Part of: Supreme Command for Jihad and Liberation (2007–2011)
- Wars: the Iraq War, the Iraqi insurgency (2011–13), the Iraqi Civil War (2014–2017), and the Iraqi insurgency (2017–present)
- Website: alnakshabandia.net

The Army of the Men of the Naqshbandi Order (Arabic: جيش رجال الطريقة النقشبندية, romanized: Jaysh Rijāl al-Ṭarīqah al-Naqshbandiyya, JRTN), also known as the Naqshbandi Army, is an Iraqi Ba'athist militant group which fought against occupying U.S.-led Coalition forces as part of the Iraqi insurgency during the Iraq War, and then continued to fight following the withdrawal of American troops. Media outlets frequently refer to the group by the initials JRTN, a romanization of its Arabic name. Supreme Command for Jihad and Liberation, technically the name of the umbrella organization to which JRTN belongs, is also often used to refer to JRTN specifically.

It was named after the Naqshbandi Sufi order. The JRTN's ideology has been described as "a mix of Islamic and pan-Arab nationalistic ideas", and "under the influence of Ba'athist and Islamist political ideals" with Izzat Ibrahim al-Douri being described as "the hidden sheikh of the Men of the Naqshbandis".

== History ==
The precise details about the emergence of the JRTN are unclear, although it is generally assumed that the group was established in the summer of 2003 and consists of former members of Saddam Hussein's army, including ex-members of Republican Guard, former Ba‘ath Party officials, former security and military intelligence agents (with connections to Izzat Ibrahim al-Douri) who seek to fight and eject Coalition forces from Iraq and to restore the old order under Ba'athist ideology.

Although JRTN would only emerge as a group in 2006, JRTN members had been involved in anti-coalition actions earlier in the war, such as the 2003 attack on the Al Rasheed Baghdad Hotel, and the 2004 First Battle of Fallujah, where several Naqshbandi clerics associated with the JRTN were among the casualties.

JRTN originally emerged as a militant group in December 2006, following the execution of Saddam Hussein. The group's original focus was on protecting Naqshbandis and Sunni Sufis in Iraq from the oppression they were facing from radical Salafi Islamist insurgent groups, particularly al-Qaeda in Iraq, whose tactics were opposed by JRTN's Sufi ideology.

Between its founding in 2006 and the 2011 U.S. withdrawal from Iraq, JRTN planned, financed, and facilitated militant attacks against U.S. forces and military bases. JRTN's last attack on U.S. forces would occur on November 3, 2011 when 1st Lt. Dustin D. Vincent was shot dead by JRTN sniper fire in Kirkuk Governorate. His killing – one of the last U.S. casualties in Iraq war – was captured on video by Naqshbandi Army and posted online.

On April 25, 2013, insurgents from the Naqshbandi Army completely captured the town of Sulaiman Bek, about 170 km (106 mi) north of Baghdad, after heavy fighting with security forces, only to relinquish control of it a day later, while escaping with weapons and vehicles.

Following the Hawija clashes, JRTN units in Nineveh began to mobilize, emerging as a force that could potentially play a role in a new low-level Sunni uprising. Immediately after the Hawija clashes, JRTN units were able to take temporary control of a neighborhood in the 17 July area of western Mosul.

On January 18, 2014, Reuters reported that after the Islamic State of Iraq and the Levant and its tribal Sunni allies overran Fallujah and parts of the nearby city Ramadi on January 1, the Army of the Men of the Naqshbandi Order was one of the Sunni rebel groups present in the city. JRTN has not claimed any attacks since 2016 with this leading some to believe that the group had at some point disbanded.

== Focus and methods ==
The group operates in Kirkuk Province and other parts of northern Iraq, and is linked to Saddam Hussein's former aide Izzat Ibrahim al-Douri, an adherent of the Naqshbandi order, and is thought to be the largest militant group of former Ba'athists. Outside of Kirkuk, the group has carried out operations in Baghdad, Al Anbar, Nineveh, Diyala and Salah al-Din provinces.

The Army of the Men of the Naqshbandi Order frequently filmed and distributed footage of themselves on their websites showing the group attacking American depots and ambushing Iraqi government and American forces with mortars, IEDs and homemade missiles, as well as light machine guns and sniper rifles.

The group avoided direct confrontation with U.S. forces, relying instead on guerrilla tactics. The group's main focus was on a two-pronged strategy. The first phase was focused on defense, where the group attacked soft targets while building up its power and training and cooperating with other groups to widen the armed opposition. Local emirs, each responsible for 7–10 fighters, were set up in every province. The emirs were in turn led by an Emir al-Jihad, a Grand Sheikh of Tariqah al-Naqshbandiyya.

=== Media ===
The group also used the web and print media to expand its membership and influence. Online the group links to videos showing attacks on Coalition forces, whereas its magazine publishes articles describing Sufism and Jihad, whilst trying to promote its ideology and requesting donations.

== Ideology ==
The JRTN was originally composed mainly of groups wishing to restore the old order under the Ba'athist ideology. The JRTN is predominantly composed of Iraqi Sunnis of the Sufi Naqshbandi order trying to force foreign troops out of Iraq until the withdrawal of the US in 2011. Since the JRTN is led by Saddam's former deputy Izzat Ibrahim al-Douri and contains many former Iraqi regime elements, Ba'athism and Iraqi nationalism have become important parts of its ideology. The JRTN often emphasizes and appeals to different ideologies in different circumstances, appealing to both traditional Arab nationalism as well as Islamic unity in order to achieve its goals.

The group's practice of both Sufism and embrace of violence is controversial, and Sufism had been tolerated under the Ba'athist government of Saddam Hussein due to its peaceful and relatively apolitical nature. Government tolerance for Sufism even resulted in its adoption by several members of the ruling Ba'ath party. However, despite its roots in a desire to protect Sufis, the group has declared itself to be fighting to maintain Iraq's unity along with its Arab and Islamic character. As such, the group can be seen as pursuing a nationalistic as opposed to the religious line. The group's main desire is to return the former Ba'ath Party to power in part due to the many freedoms Naqshbandi enjoyed under the Ba'ath party. Others have accused the group of merely acquiring the Naqshbandi name in order to increase its popularity. Although the group recognizes a direct return to Baathist control is impossible, they focus instead on infiltrating former Ba'athists into positions of power to hopefully dominate a future nationalist government. The group then wishes to portray itself and the wider Baath party as a technocratic alternative to a currently incompetent Shia Islamist government that is incapable of delivering services. Maintaining chaos in Iraq is a key part of this plan as the JRTN must ensure living standards do not improve under the current government so as to make the group appear more attractive.

The group was strongly anti-Coalition and supported the targeting of Coalition forces in Iraq, believing that coalition forces including individuals, equipment and supplies, were legitimate targets at any time or place in Iraq. Iraqis are not considered valid targets unless fighting with Coalition forces. The group is opposed to fighting other insurgent groups and will cooperate if they are committed to the same agenda.

People such as Ibrahim al-Sumadaie of the Iraqi Constitutional Party fear that JRTN could become increasingly attractive to Sunnis either aggrieved by a Shiite-dominated government or those such as the Awakening Councils who left the insurgency and switched sides to the Coalition forces to fight al Qaeda who now feel abandoned. Security officials contend that thousands of Sunni insurgents who are upset by Maliki's failure to absorb them into the military are being recruited by JRTN and will pose a threat to stability. This is in turn helped by the fact that JRTN survived as the popularity of more fundamentalist groups such as Al Qaeda in Iraq waned, leaving them as one of the last few major opposition groups. The JRTN platform is attractive to Sunnis due less to an explicitly Baathist or Arab nationalist socialist platform than to the idea of the creation of an area where Sunnis can be Sunnis.

According to a US intelligence officer, members of JRTN can often be respected figures within local government or influential figures within their communities. These figures don't necessarily act violently, allowing them to blend in and making it difficult to obtain warrants issued by the Iraqi court to arrest them. JRTN cells have also been characterized as a familial organization, with members often being part of the same family or tied to the Sheikh Maqsud sub-tribe of the Al-Douris, meaning that at its most fundamental level, JRTN is an Al-Douri family business. The group also relies on tribal loyalties of Sunni Arabs for support in Kirkuk province, where many Sunni Arabs were located to from Tikrit during Saddam Hussein's tenure.

=== Politics ===
JRTN was strongly opposed to any involvement in the political process during the occupation of Iraq and now works to overthrow the government of Nouri al-Maliki. The group believes the Shiite-dominated government is unfit to govern Sunnis, contending that the government is an Iranian puppet and persecutes Sunnis. Douri claimed in 2009 that JRTN would soon gain power and "invite Obama to negotiations".

==== Relationship with the Ba'ath Party ====
The former flag of Iraq is a key symbol for the group.

JRTN is linked to the "New Baath Party" led by Izzat Ibrahim al-Douri, an adherent of the Naqshbandi Order. Many members of both the New Baath Party and the JRTN are former officials and soldiers who served under Saddam Hussein. US military officers contend that many JRTN members are believed to be former Iraqi military officers, due in part to JRTN statements often being infused with military terminology as well as their vetting procedures of new recruits involving putting new members in a 90-day trial period in which they are required to carry out low-level attacks, endure physical abuse, and background checks to ensure they are not affiliated with the Islamic State.

Other factions within the New Baath Party oppose a strong connection with JRTN. Senior Baath Party member Mohammed Younis al-Ahmed and his followers are politically divided with al-Douri's wing of the party, with the Yunis faction aiming to return to the political process and re-legitimize the political party while al-Douri advocates the creation of a separate Sunni Arab Iraq. Several New Baath Party members have opposed affiliation with JRTN as the party becomes reduced to a militant movement that overshadows political efforts.

=== Relationship with other insurgent groups ===
JRTN has called for the unification of insurgent groups in order to fight against Coalition forces and has, in turn, worked with several anti-Coalition groups. JRTN often facilitates money, weapons, information, and safe-houses for other groups, such as Ansar al-Sunna, the Islamic Army in Iraq, 1920 Revolution Brigades, and the Islamic State of Iraq. JRTN then in turn often acts as a public face for these groups, with other insurgent groups giving JRTN videotapes of attacks to be placed on the Internet and TV. Although initially founded as a reaction against Sunni fundamentalist groups such as al-Qaeda, which consider Sufi groups transgressors, there has been an instance of cooperation between JRTN and such groups, including al-Qaeda in Iraq.

Sufi and Salafist al-Qaeda members fought together in 2004 during the battle for Fallujah under the leadership of Sheikh Abdullah al-Janabi, a Sufi. After Fallujah, Al Qaeda's relationship with Sufis became more hostile, and Al Qaeda began antagonizing Sufis, attacking their sacred places, and desecrating tombs of Sufi saints. As such, the relationship between the two groups is now unclear. According to the Brookings Institution, in May 2011, Iraqi Sunni Arabs were increasingly supportive of JRTN, providing the group with money, which implies declining support for al-Qaeda. Nevertheless, JRTN often sub-contracted to the Islamic State of Iraq (ISI), funneling money to them due to their greater operational capabilities. JRTN has used ISI to carry out car bombings on political opponents and Iraqi Security Forces. Direct ISI responsibility also allowed the JRTN to deny responsibility for deaths, deaths which the ISI is happy to take credit for. According to US Brigade General Craig Nixon, "Al Qaeda's power may be on the wane after inflicting so many civilian casualties. But the Sufi-inspired order can present itself as a more indigenous resistance."

In May 2014, JRTN published a statement denying the group had issued a fatwa of a declaration of war against ISIL, with the group saying regarding the claims by Iraqi media, "We absolutely deny issuing any fatwa to incite killing or fighting among the myriad of groups and components of our people and we are not responsible for such a thing, and we have called for resistance to the Zionist-American-Majusi occupation through all legitimate paths and means, and we have declared that since America and its allies first brought their armies together to attack Iraq."

In June 2014 it was reported that JRTN had become a major component of the Sunni coalition led by the Islamic State in Iraq and the Levant ("ISIS") in Western Iraq, although there was also a report that JRTN had also been fighting ISIS in Hawija, Iraq. Through information gathered from contacts with Sunni rebels and ISIS, it appears that a deal was struck in September 2014 aimed at reconciliation between ISIS and the Naqshbandi Army. In Anbar, Salah al-Din and Diyala provinces the main rebel groups, the Naqshbandi Army, the Mujahideen Army and Ansar al-Islam in Kurdistan have pledged allegiance to ISIS and are being supplied with weaponry, equipment and money by ISIS.

In October 2015 it was reported that the group was involved in secret discussions with the Iraqi government, alongside other insurgent groups, as part of a move to create a new Sunni force to fight ISIS in Iraq. However the group has previously denied claims that it was willing to collaborate with the west or Iraqi government to fight ISIL.

=== Funding ===
JRTN core values stipulate that funding will only be accepted from Muslim supporters. Izzat Ibrahim al-Duri is often speculated as being fundraising for the group outside of Iraq, especially given that it has become essentially the de facto armed wing of the Iraqi Ba'ath Party. The group's magazine calls on Muslims to donate to the group, stating that to do so is to fund jihad, which it argues is equivalent to fighting and fulfilling one's jihadi religious obligations. The exact scale of the funding the group receives is unknown. Many of the group's finances particularly former Republican Guard officers reportedly comes from Jordan and, to a lesser extent, Syria and Yemen.

== Leadership ==
Although Izzat Ibrahim al-Douri was long often referred to as the group's leader, his status within the organization was never unambiguously clear, some claimed he was closely linked to the JRTN but outside its leadership. Al-Douri was a key personality for the JRTN regardless of whether or not he actually held a position of operational leadership. It has been suggested that al-Douri played a role in encouraging the people of Iraq to become more religious during Saddam Hussein's rule, which is why the Naqshbandi Order became increasingly popular amongst Iraqi Ba'athists.

Other suspected or confirmed members of the group's leadership include:

| Name | Membership dates | Role |
|---|---|---|
| Sheikh Abdullah Mustafa al-Naqshbandi | (Unknown to Unknown) | Leader |
| Izzat Ibrahim al-Douri aka Naqshbandi Sheikh | (Unknown to Unknown) | Leader; death announced on 26 October 2020 by the official Ba'ath Party Facebook page. |
| Abdullah Ibrahim Muhammad al-Juburi | (Unknown to Unknown) | Senior Militant |
| Muhammad Ahmad Salim | (Unknown to Unknown) | Commander |
| Wathiq Alwan al Amiri | (Unknown to 12 December 2009) | Media Coordinator; arrested by Iraqi and US forces in Tikrit Iraq December 12, 2009 |
| Abd al Majid Hadithi | (Unknown to 12 December 2009) | Former Media Manager, Propaganda Distributor; arrested by Iraqi and US forces in Tikrit Iraq December 12, 2009 |
| Muhanned Muhammed Abd al Jabbar al Rawi | (Unknown to 12 December 2009) | Media Gatherer, Producer, Showcaser; arrested by Iraqi and US forces in Tikrit Iraq December 12, 2009 |
| Qaid Shehab al-Douri | (Unknown to 21 November 2010) | Commander; arrested during a counter-terrorism operation on November 21, 2010 in the al-Dour area east of Tikrit in Iraq's Salah ad Din province |
Source: Stanford University

== Terrorist designations by the United States ==
The U.S. Department of State has designated Jaysh Rijal al-Tariqah al-Naqshbandiyya (JRTN) as Specially Designated Global Terrorists (SDGT) under Executive Order 13224, and as a Foreign Terrorist Organization (FTO). On 22 December 2009, the U.S. Department of the Treasury designated "the Iraq-based insurgent group Jaysh Rijal al-Tariqah al-Naqshbandiyya (JRTN) for threatening the peace and stabilization efforts in Iraq" saying, "JRTN has committed, directed, supported, or posed a significant risk of committing acts of violence against Coalition and Iraqi Security Forces and is being designated today pursuant to Executive Order (E.O.) 13438, which targets insurgent and militia groups and their supporters".

== See also ==
- Combatants of the Iraq War
- List of armed groups in the Iraqi Civil War
- Iraqi insurgency (2003–2011)
- U.S. Department of State list of Foreign Terrorist Organizations
- Salvation Force
- Military Council for the Liberation of Syria - Syrian neo-Ba'athist analogue
- Syrian Popular Resistance - Syrian neo-Ba'athist analogue
