= Zadig =

1747 novella by Voltaire

Zadig, or The Book of Fate
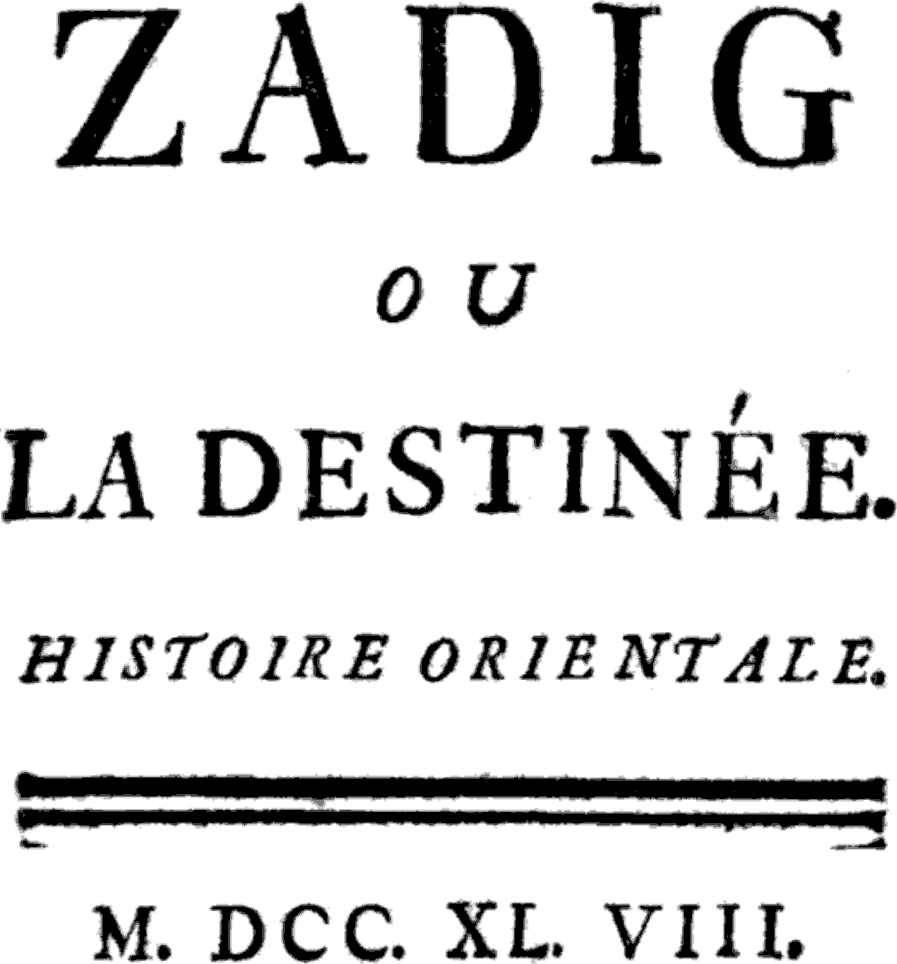
- Author: Voltaire
- Original title: Zadig ou la Destinée
- Language: French
- Genre: Philosophical novella
- Published: 1747
- Publication place: France
- Media type: Print

Zadig; or, The Book of Fate (French: Zadig ou la Destinée; 1747) is a novella and work of philosophical fiction by the Enlightenment writer Voltaire. It tells the story of Zadig, a Zoroastrian philosopher in ancient Babylonia. The story of Zadig is a fictional story. Voltaire does not attempt any historical accuracy. The singular narrative and unique journey of Zadig still stands as a philosophical reference to “nothing is either good or bad without the comparison of one with the other.”

It was originally published as Memnon in Amsterdam (with a false imprint of London given) and first issued under its more familiar title in 1748.

The book makes use of the Persian tale The Three Princes of Serendip. It is philosophical in nature, and presents human life as in the hands of a destiny beyond human control. Voltaire challenges religious and metaphysical orthodoxy with his presentation of the moral revolution taking place in Zadig himself. Zadig is one of Voltaire's most celebrated works after Candide. Many literary critics have praised Voltaire's use of contradiction and juxtaposition.

The protagonist's name is derived from the Hebrew and Arabic terms tzadik and seddik, a title bestowed on a particularly righteous person – though Voltaire's character is not presented as a Jew and does not exactly fit the criteria set in Jewish tradition for use of the term. This combined with the geographic setting of Babylon indicates he is likely of Arabian descent.

== Characters ==
- Zadig – The protagonist, a Babylonian philosopher.
- Sémire – Zadig's original love interest.
- Orcan – Zadig's rival for Sémire and nephew of a certain Minister of State.
- Azora – Zadig's second love interest.
- Cador – Zadig's confident and faithful friend.
- Moabdar – The King of Babylon.
- Astarté – Queen of Babylon, Zadig's final love interest.
- Sétoc – An Egyptian merchant and Zadig's master while he is enslaved.
- Almona – A widow.
- Arbogad – A brigand.
- Jesrad – An angel who disguises himself as a retired philosopher and hermit

== Plot summary ==
Zadig, a good-hearted, handsome young man from Babylonia, is in love with Sémire and they are to marry. Sémire, however, has another suitor: Orcan, who wants her for himself. Zadig tries to defend his love from Orcan's threat, but his eye is injured in the process. Sémire abhors this injury, causing her to depart with his enemy. Shortly after, Zadig makes a full recovery and falls into the arms of another woman, Azora, whom he marries, but who promptly betrays him.

Disillusioned with women, Zadig turns to science, but his knowledge lands him in prison, the first of several injustices to befall him. Indeed, the conte derives its pace and rhythm from the protagonist's ever-changing fortunes which see him rise to great heights and fall to great lows. Upon his release from prison, Zadig rises in favour with the king and queen of Babylonia and is eventually appointed prime minister; in this role, he proves himself to be a very honest man, looked upon favourably by the king, as he passes fair judgements on his citizens unlike the other ministers who base their judgements on the people's wealth. He is forced to flee the kingdom, though, when his relationship with King Moabdar is compromised: Zadig's reciprocated love for queen Astarté is discovered and he worries that the king's desire for revenge might drive him to kill the queen.

Having reached Egypt, Zadig kills an Egyptian man while valiantly saving a woman from his attack on her. Under the law of the land, this crime means that he must become a slave. His new master, Sétoc, is soon impressed by Zadig's wisdom and they become friends. In one incident, Zadig manages to reverse an ancient custom of certain tribes in which women felt obliged to burn themselves alive with their husbands on the death of the latter. After attempting to resolve other religious disputes, Zadig enrages local clerics who attempt to have him killed. Fortunately for him, though, a woman that he saved (Almona) from being burned intervenes so that he avoids death. Almona marries Sétoc, who in turn gives Zadig his freedom and then he begins his journey back to Babylonia in order to discover what has become of Astarté. (In some versions there is a further episode in which he visits Serendib and advises the king on the choice of a treasurer and a wife.)

En route, he is taken captive by a group of Arabs, from whom he learns that king Moabdar has been killed, but he does not learn anything of what has become of Astarté. Arbogad, the leader of the group of Arabs, sets him free and he heads for Babylonia once more, equipped with the knowledge that a rebellion has taken place to oust the king. On this journey he meets an unhappy fisherman who is about to commit suicide as he has no money, but Zadig gives him some money to ease his woes, telling us that source of his own unhappiness is in his heart, whereas the fisherman's are only financial concerns. Zadig prevents him from committing suicide and he continues on his way.

Zadig then stumbles upon a meadow in which women are searching for a basilisk for their lord who is ill, ordered by his doctor to find one of these rare animals to cure his sickness. The lord has promised to marry the woman who finds the basilisk. While there, Zadig sees a woman writing "ZADIG" in the ground, and he identifies her as Astarté. His former lover recounts what happened to her since Zadig fled Babylonia: she lived inside a statue when he left, but one day, she spoke while her husband was praying before the statue. The king's country was invaded and both Astarté and his new wife, Missouf, were taken prisoners by the same group. The king's wife agrees to formulate a plan along with Astarté to help her escape so that she would not have a rival for the king. Astarté ends up with Arbogad, the very same robber that Zadig encountered, who then sold her to Lord Ogul, her current master. In order to secure Astarté's release from Ogul, Zadig pretends to be a physician. He offers Lord Ogul to bring him a basilisk if he grants Astarté her freedom; instead of providing the basilisk, the lord is tricked into taking some exercise, which is what he really needs to cure him from his illness.

Astarté returns to Babylonia where she is pronounced queen before a competition begins to find her a new king. Zadig is secretly given white armor and a fine horse to compete with by Astarté. Zadig in his white armor triumphs in the contest which takes place between four anonymous knights, but one of the losing competitors, the lord Itobad, steals Zadig's armour and replaces it with his own before the winner is revealed, and dressed in Zadig's armor falsely claims victory. Zadig is forced to wear Itobad's armor and is recognized as the losing knight by the people. Zadig is ridiculed and bemoans his fate, thinking that he will never be happy.

While wandering on the banks of the Euphrates, Zadig encounters a hermit reading "the book of destinies". Zadig makes a vow to accompany the hermit for the next few days on the condition that he won't abandon the hermit no matter what he does. The hermit claims that he will teach Zadig lessons in life; in one such incident, the pair go to an opulent castle and are treated generously. The lord of the castle gives each of them a gold piece before sending them off. After leaving, Zadig finds that the hermit has stolen the gold basin that the lord allowed them to wash in. Afterwards, they visit the house of a miser and are treated somewhat rudely by the servant and are pushed to leave, but the hermit gives the servant the two gold pieces from the lord and gives the miser the gold basin he stole. The aim, he tells Zadig, is that the hospitable man at the castle will learn not to be as ostentatious and vain, and the miser will learn how to treat guests. They then arrive at the simple home of a retired philosopher who welcomes the travelers in. The philosopher talks of the fight for the crown in Babylonia, revealing that he wished Zadig had fought for the crown not knowing that Zadig is one of his two guests. In the morning, at dawn, the hermit wakes Zadig to leave. To Zadig's horror, the hermit sets fire to the philosopher's home.

In the last encounter, Zadig and the hermit stay with a widow and her young nephew. After their stay the boy accompanies the travelers to the bridge by the widow's orders. At the bridge, the hermit asks the boy to come to him. He then throws the fourteen-year-old into the river drowning him, as he claims that Providence tells that he would have killed his aunt within a year, and Zadig within two. The hermit then reveals his true identity as the angel Jesrad, and opines that Zadig, out of all men, deserves to be best informed about Fate. Jesrad states that wickedness is necessary to maintain the order of the world and to ensure that good survives. Nothing happens by chance, according to the angel: Zadig happened upon the fisherman to save his life, for example. Zadig should be submissive to Fate, he continues, and should return to Babylonia, advice which he follows. (This passage is based on one of the suras of the Quran (Sura 18 (Al-Kahf), v. 65–82), when Moses follows a mysterious character, endowed with great knowledge, through his journey.)

On his return, the final part of the challenge to be king is taking place: the Enigmas. Zadig solves the Enigmas with consummate ease and proves that it was he that won the first contest by challenging Itobad once again to a duel. Zadig offers to fight wearing only his robes and armed with a sword against Itobad clad in the stolen white armor. Itobad accepts this challenge. Zadig manages to defeat Itobad, and takes back the stolen armor. Zadig marries Astarté, is crowned king, and rules over a prosperous kingdom.

== Influence ==
The detective work portrayed in Zadig was influential. Marquis de Sade refers directly to Voltaire's work in the first pages of Justine ou les Malheurs de la vertu, 1791. Georges Cuvier wrote, in 1834, in the context of the new science of paleontology:

"Today, anyone who sees only the print of a cloven hoof might conclude that the animal that had left it behind was a ruminator, and this conclusion is as certain as any in physics and in ethics. This footprint alone, then, provides the observer with information about the teeth, the jawbone, the vertebrae, each leg bone, the thighs, shoulders and pelvis of the animal which had just passed: it is a more certain proof than all Zadig's tracks."

T. H. Huxley, the proponent of Darwin's theories of evolution, also found Zadig's approach instructive, and wrote in his 1880 article "On the Method of Zadig":

"What, in fact, lay at the foundation of all Zadig's arguments, but the coarse, commonplace assumption, upon which every act of our daily lives is based, that we may conclude from an effect to the pre-existence of a cause competent to produce that effect?"

Edgar Allan Poe may have been inspired by Zadig when he created C. Auguste Dupin in "The Murders in the Rue Morgue", which Poe called a "tale of ratiocination" and which established the modern detective fiction genre. Émile Gaboriau and Arthur Conan Doyle were perhaps also influenced by Zadig. As Barzun and Taylor put it in A Catalogue of Crime: "However implausible and 'agrarian' his method, he is the first systematic detective in modern literature, and that priority itself adds to his troubles in the story until his royal vindication."

The text also influenced the Icelandic romance-saga Fimmbræðra saga, whose author, Jón Oddsson Hjaltalín, also adapted Zadig itself into Icelandic.

== See also ==
- Zadok
