= Kálfafell =

Hamlet in south east Iceland

Coordinates: 64°10′50″N 15°52′33″W

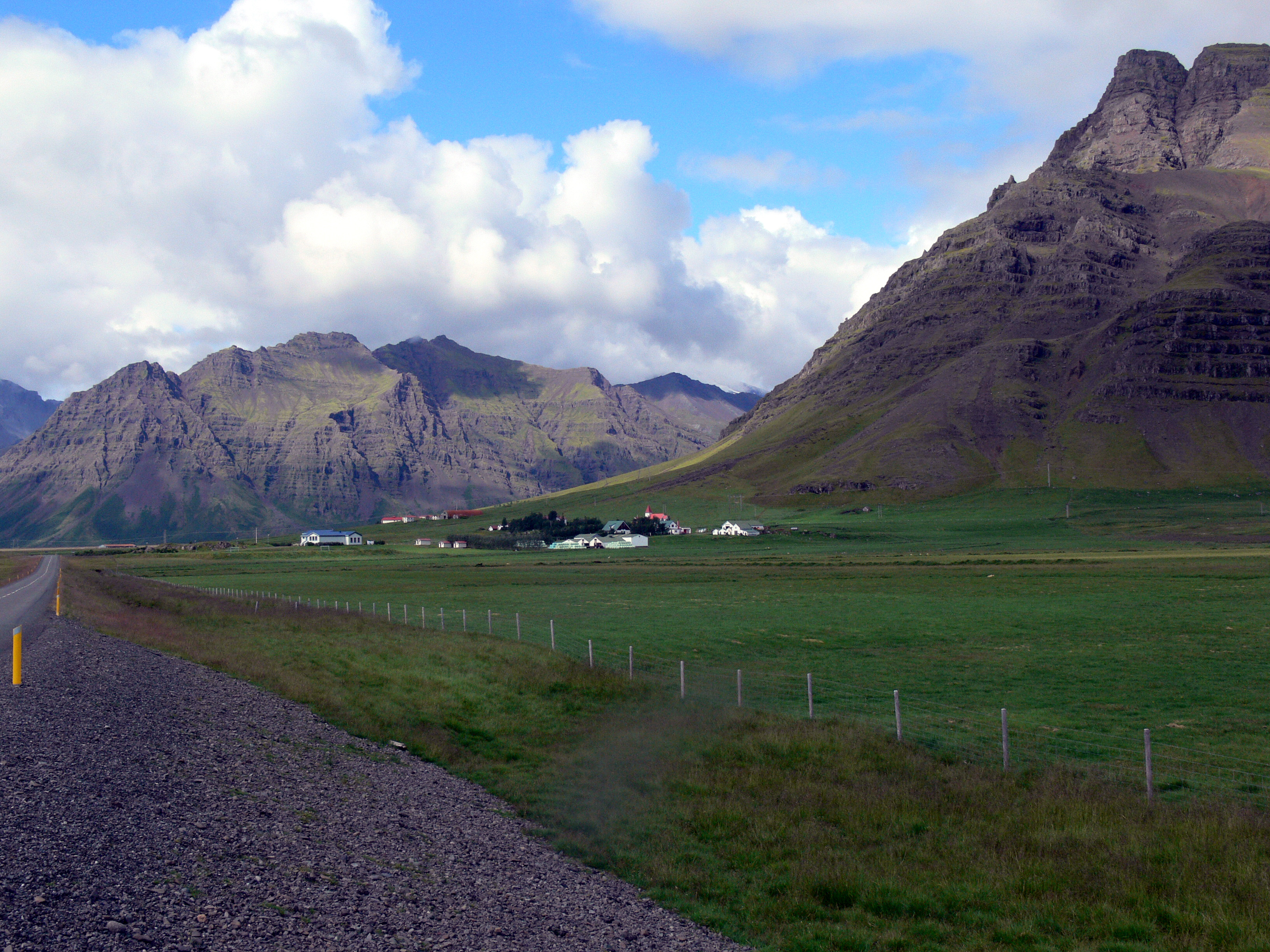
Kálfafellsstaður

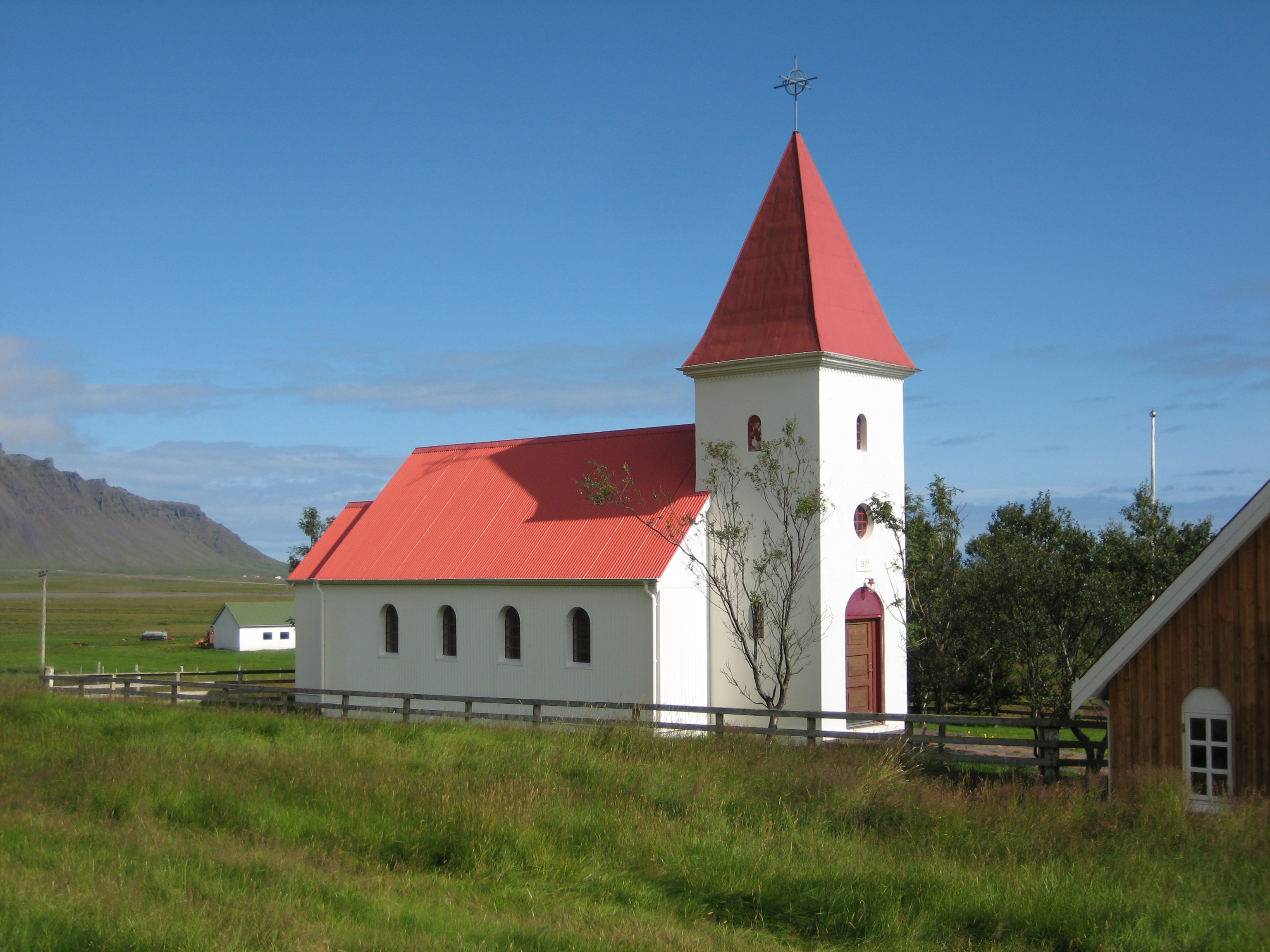
Kálfafellsstaðarkirkja

Kálfafell (Icelandic pronunciation: [ˈkʰaulvaˌfɛtl̥]) is a hamlet in south east Iceland, near the Vatnajökull glacier. It is in the municipality of Hornafjörður.
