= Reykjavík Mosque =

Mosque in Reykjavík, Iceland

- Moskan í Reykjavík
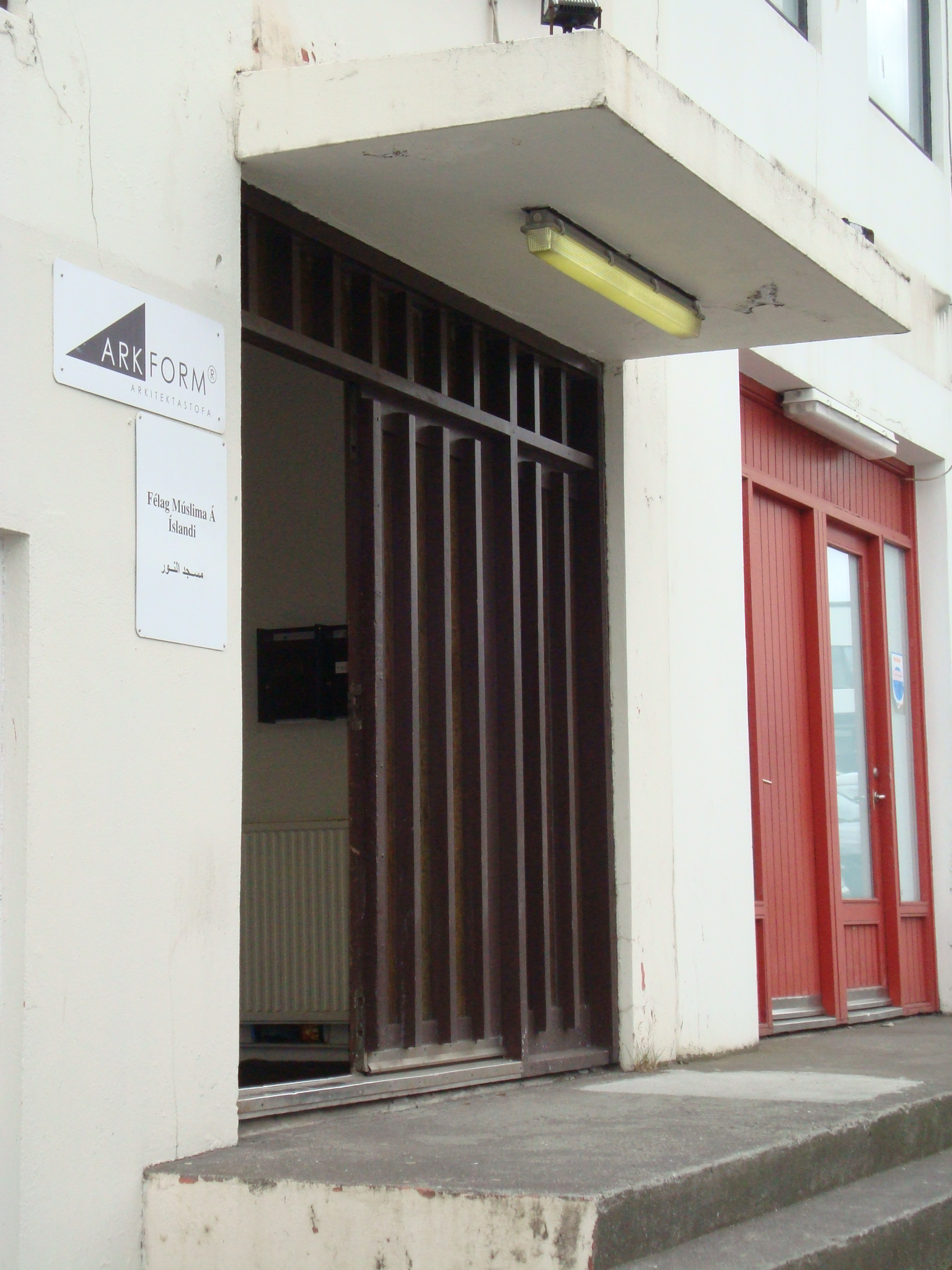
- The mosque entrance in 2008

- Location of the mosque in Iceland

Religion
- Affiliation: Sunni Islam
- Ecclesiastical or organizational status: Mosque
- Leadership: Sheikh Salmann Tamimi
- Status: Active

Location
- Location: Reykjavík
- Country: Iceland
- Interactive map of Reykjavík Mosque
- Coordinates: 64°08′3″N 21°52′30″W

Architecture
- Style: Office complex
- Groundbreaking: 1987
- Completed: 1991

Specifications
- Capacity: 50 worshipers
- Dome height (outer): 27 m (90 ft)
- Minaret height: 40 m (130 ft)

Website
- islam.is

The Reykjavík Mosque (Icelandic: Moskan í Reykjavík) is a mosque and community space for Muslims, located in the Ármúli district of Reykjavík, Iceland. The mosque was opened in 2002 by the Muslim Association of Iceland after requesting the city government for permission to build a purpose-built mosque in 2000.

== Services ==
It offers Friday prayers every week and it is also open for all other prayers during the day from Fajr to Isha. In January 2009, a new wooden altar was built by members of the association. On Sundays, there are Quran lessons for kids of different ages. There are also meetings for different subjects of Muslims in Iceland.

In the year 2013, for the Islamic month of Ramadan (which fell in most of July and the beginning of August), the Muslim Association of Iceland invited Ismaeel Malik, an American then studying at Umm al-Qura University, to lead the prayers and deliver the Friday sermons. On Saturdays, the mosque held dinners along with motivational lectures. Ismaeel Malik was also invited to an Iftar dinner hosted by Luis E. Arreaga, the then-United States Ambassador to Iceland. The ambassador and the embassy staff were "particularly pleased" to have an American Muslim visiting Iceland participate in the dinner.

== History ==
Permission to build a purpose-built mosque was first sought in 1999. The city government authorized a plot of land much smaller than requested but did not approve the building plans. The project stalled when approval of additional land and further progress was tied to approval of the adjacent Russian Orthodox church. This delay was 'especially signalled as a possible sign of prejudice against Muslims by the ECRI (European Commission Against Racism and Intolerance) human rights report on Iceland in 2007'. On July 6, 2013, Reykjavík City Council, under the leadership of Jón Gnarr, gave permission for an 800-square-metre (8,600 sq ft) purpose-built mosque in Reykjavík, with a roof no higher than 9 metres (30 ft) and a 10-metre-tall (33 ft) minaret, in the easternmost part of Sogamýri, between Miklubraut and Suðurlandsbraut. Following a design competition, a design was chosen in 2015 by Gunnlaugur Stefán Baldursson and Pia Bickmann; the mosque is to include a prayer hall, library, information centre and probably a restaurant.

According to the chair of the Muslim Association of Iceland, Ibrahim Sverrir Agnarsson:

"My hope is that the mosque can serve as a statement of liberalism, open to all, a place where a North African laborer can pray next to a U. S. businessman."

The decision to grant the building plot free of charge proved to be controversial. The decision also led to the creation of a Facebook group "We protest against a mosque in Iceland" by Skúli Skúlason. One independent opinion poll of adults run between September 26 and October 1, 2013 asked ‘hversu fylgjandi eða andvíg(ur) ertu því að eftirfarandi trúfélög fái að byggja trúarbyggingar á Íslandi’ ('how supportive or opposed are you that the following religious groups should get to build a religious building in Iceland?'). It found fairly consistent and positive attitudes by Icelanders to the construction of religious structures by the Church of Iceland and the neo-pagan Ásatrúarfélagið (8.5% and 9.1% opposed, 67.2% and 54.7% in favour, respectively), but quite strong opposition to the Muslim Association of Iceland building a religious building (43.4% opposed, 31.5% in favour).

At first, the only significant political figure to voice objections was the one-time mayor of Reykjavík Ólafur Friðrik Magnússon, in 2013, but the campaign for the 2014 Icelandic local elections saw further negative comments, prominently from the Progressive Party candidate for Mayor, Sveinbjörg Birna Sveinbjörnsdóttir. In 2015, the Icelandic president, Ólafur Ragnar Grímsson, claimed that the Government of Saudi Arabia intended to donate money to the mosque. The Muslim congregation in Iceland said they had never heard of this money.

Siðmennt, the Icelandic Ethical Humanist Association, issued a statement about it in general terms and did not criticise this particular decision because of the principle of equal treatment. According to Siðmennt, it was not part of municipality's functions to grant building plots to religious or life-stance organizations, such as the Evangelic-Lutheran State Church, the Catholic Church, or the Association of Muslims in Iceland, free of charge. However, since that system is in place it must be applied equally to all. Siðmennt would not apply for a building plot for itself though in order to stick to its main principle of separation of state and church.

In 2010 Salmann Tamimi said that the Association of Muslims in Iceland would never raise money from abroad to build the new mosque. His successor, however, has said that funds for the mosque will be raised abroad, including Muslims in Kuwait and the United Arab Emirates.

In 2015, President Grímsson expressed concern that Saudi Arabian financing of a Reykjavík mosque will fuel Islamic extremism in Iceland, and he was,

"… shocked to the point of paralysis when he learned last March, in a meeting with Saudi Arabian Ambassador, that the government of Saudi Arabia had decided to interfere in Icelandic religious life by donating US$1 million to the planned mosque".

== References in art and literature ==
A positive, fictional account of the building of Reykjavík's first purpose-built mosque appears in Eiríkur Örn Norðdahl's 2009 novel Gæska: Skáldsaga. Iceland's submission to the 2015 Venice Biennale, by Christoph Büchel, was an installation in a deconsecrated church entitled The Mosque: The First Mosque in the Historic City of Venice. This was partly inspired by the Reykjavík Mosque controversy, and was itself a source of rancour, being swiftly shut down by the Venetian authorities.

== See also ==
- Islam in Iceland
- List of first mosques by country
