= Sulaiman Bek =

Town in Saladin Governorate, Iraq

- Town
- Location in Iraq
- Coordinates: 34°47′37″N 44°39′56″E
- Country: Iraq
- Governorate: Saladin Governorate
- District: Tooz District

Population
  - Total: 30,000

Sulaiman Bek (Arabic: سليمان بيك), also spelled as Sulayman Beg is a town in Saladin Governorate, Iraq, located some 170 km (105 mi) north of Baghdad.

The town is demographically Sunni Arab. Among the tribes present are the Al-Nuaim, Jubur, Bani Az, Albu Salih, Khazraj, and Al-Bayat tribes. The village of Hafriya is situated nearby.

In June 2014, Daesh took control of the town as the Iraqi Army left the area. It was taken back in September 2014.
