= Amal Tamimi =

Icelandic politician

- أمل تميمي

Member of Parliament of Iceland
- In office 2011–2012
- Constituency: Substitute for Lúðvík Geirsson and Katrín Júlíusdóttir

Personal details
- Born: January 7, 1960 Jerusalem, Jordan-occupied Palestine
- Party: Social Democratic Alliance
- Children: 6 (Falastine, Fida, Wala, Majd, Ahd, Bissan Inga)
- Relatives: Salmann Tamimi
- Education: University of Iceland
- Occupation: Feminist, social activist, politician

Amal Tamimi (Arabic: أمل تميمي; born Jerusalem, 7 January 1960) is a Palestinian-born Icelandic feminist, social activist, and politician. She was the second foreign-born person (after Paul Fontaine Nikolov) and the first foreign-born woman to sit in the Icelandic parliament (a substitute for Lúðvík Geirsson in 2011 and for Katrín Júlíusdóttir in 2012).

== Life in Jordan occupied Palestine, 1960–95 ==
Amal was born in 1960, growing up in Wadi-el-Joz in east Jerusalem. Her father was Salim Abu Khaled al Tamimi (d. 1969), a businessman and passionate activist, and her mother Salim's second wife Nazima abu Rajabb al Tamimi (d. 1981); her siblings are Yonnes (b. 1950), Rowda (b. 1948), Safah (b. 1949), Amneh, and Salmann (b. 1955). Yonnes moved to Iceland in 1966, Amneh some years later, and Salmann in 1971.

Amal lived through the Six-Day War in 1967; the fact that Yonnes was in Iceland at the time meant that he lost his right to reside in Israel. Amal was politically active through most of her time in Israel. At 13, she was imprisoned pending trial for two weeks for throwing stones at Israeli soldiers, and received a six-month suspended sentence. She married for the first time at 16, and had the children Falastine (b. 1978), Fida (b. 1980), Wala (b. 1985), Majd (b. 1986), and Ahd (b. 1990), before leaving her husband after what she has described as an abusive marriage in 1995 and fleeing with her children to her brother Salmann (Suleiman) in Iceland. Later, Amal said that she felt she had no rights as a woman under Shari'a Law.

In 1987, she gained a diploma in business studies via the YWCA and worked for an NGO.

== Life in Iceland, 1995– ==
Amal first lived in Iceland in 1983–84 while separated from her husband, working for Nói Síríus.

Assisted by her brother Salmann (Suleiman), Amal moved with her five children to Iceland in January 1995. There she worked as a cleaner; then in a bakery and in fish processing, and learned Icelandic. Soon she met her second partner, Heiðar, with whom she had Bissan Inga in 1997; Amal and Heiðar parted in 2000. Amal's partnership with a non-Arab man caused a major rift in her family, including with her brother Salmann (Suleiman), who disowned her. However, this has been disputed. Although Amal did start relationship with Icelandic man, the man was Salman’s former son-in-law, which resulted in Salman disowning her.

In 2001, at the age of 41, Amal went to the University of Iceland, taking a BA in Social Sciences in 2004, with a BA thesis entitled 'Terrorism in Palestine: Religion or Colonial Imperialism?' In 2002, she received Icelandic citizenship (for which she had to give up Palestinian citizenship) and on 24 October 2003 founded W.O.M.E.N. in Iceland (Women of Multicultural Ethnicity Network). From 2004, she was a counsellor at the Alþjóðahús. In 2008, she became the first immigrant to chair Iceland's immigration council, founded the Jafnréttishús (Equality Centre) and became the first immigrant elected to Hafnarfjörður town council, while her daughter Falasteen Abu Libdeh became the first immigrant elected to Reykjavík City Council.

== See also ==
- Iceland–Palestine relations
