= Abdeljelil Temimi =

- عبد الجليل التميمي
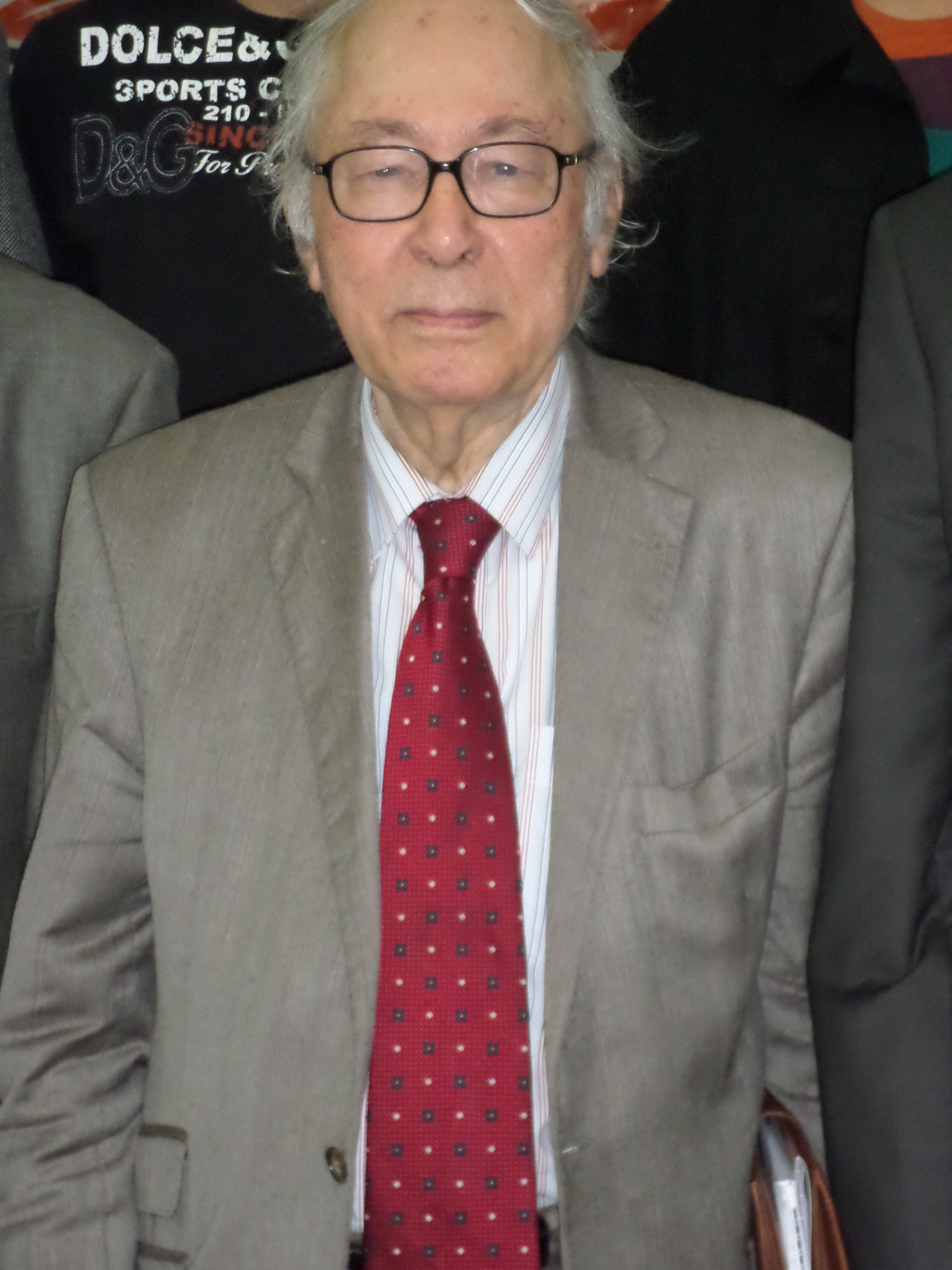
- Born: July 21, 1938 (age 88); Kairouan, French Tunisia
- Occupations: author, historian

Abdeljelil Temimi, also transliterated as Abdoljalil Tamimi (Arabic: عبد الجليل التميمي; born July 21, 1938), is a Tunisian historian. He specialises in the cultural and architectural influences of the Ottomans and Moriscos in the Arab world.

== Life ==
Temimi was born on July 21, 1938, in Kairouan. He followed primary, secondary and higher education in Tunisia, Turkey, Iraq and France, and obtained his doctorate in 1972 in modern history at the University of Aix-Provence. Furthermore, he obtained several academic diplomas in Architecture, Information Science and Library and information science at the National Archives of France, the University of Pittsburgh and the National Archives and Records Administration in Washington, D.C.

From 1972 to 2000 he was a professor in contemporary history at Tunis University.

Temimi stood at the beginning of several research institutes. At the beginning of the seventies, he was one of the founders of ARBICA in Rome. In 1985 he founded the Fondation Temimi pour la Recherche Scientifique et l'Information (FTERSI) in the city of Zaghouan, and in 1986 he founded the Arab Federation of Libraries and Information. Since his superannuation in 2000 he is honorable chairman of this federation. Furthermore, he is chairman of the Arab Committee for Ottoman Studies (Comité Arabe d’Etudes Ottomanes) since 1982 and of the International Committee of Morisco Studies (Comité International d’Etudes Morisques) since 1983.

Besides, he established a number of scientific magazines, like the Revue d'Histoire Maghrébine in 1974, the Arab Historical Review for Ottoman Studies in 1990, and the Revue Arabe d'Archives and the Documentation et d'Information in 1997. He organized dozens of congresses in the field of Social sciences and Humanities of the Arab, Morisco, Turkish and Ottoman worlds. His institute FTERSI grew to be a center of civilian and scientific dialogue, and accommodates a library with a collection of 18,000 books, 24 residential studios and two conference halls.

== Acknowledgement ==
Professor Emeritus at the University of Tunis, he is member of the Tunisian Academy of Sciences, Letters, and Arts and of the Turkish Historical Society.

In 1990, he was honored by the University of Cairo for his role in the rapprochement between Arab academics. In 1997, he was honored by the Prince Claus Award for his research of Ottoman architecture and culture in the Arab world. In the same year, he received an honorary degree from Istanbul University.

In 2001 the Institut Supérieur de Documentation published Mélanges Abdeljelil Temimi to his honor, for his contribution in library and information science and information science in Tunisia and the Arab world. In 2017, the 18th Congress of Moorish Studies of the Faculty of Letters, Arts and Humanities of Manouba pays tribute to him for his entire scientific output. In 2019, he was awarded the Maghreb Culture Prize. In 2025, he was awarded the Al Owais Award for Humanities, in recognition of his entire academic work.

== Honours ==
- Knight of the Ordre des Arts et des Lettres (France, 1984)
- Commander of the Order of Cultural Merit (Tunisia, 1991)
- Medal of the Order of Merit of the Republic of Turkey (Turkey, 2014)
- Medal of the Order of Merit for Culture (Algeria, 2024)

== Bibliography ==
Temimi published dozens of books and hundreds of articles and academical papers. The following list is a selection of his books in French and English:

- 1971: Recherches et Documents d'Histoire Maghrebine: La Tunisi, L'Algerie, Et La Tripolitaire De 1816 a 1871, Tunis University, Tunis, ISBN 978-2222029793
- 1972: Le Beylik De Constantine et Hadj Ahmed Bey (1830-1837), Publications De La Revue D'Histoire Maghrebine, 1978, thesis, Aix en Provence
- 1979: Etudes d'Histoire Morisque, Centre d'Études et de Recherches Ottomanes et Morisco-Andalouses
- 1979: Sommaire des registres arabes et Turcs d'Alger, University of Michigan
- 1984: Les provinces arabes et leurs sources documentaires a l'epoque ottomane, N. Fagin Books, Chicago, ISBN 978-2906053052
- 1994: Etudes d'Histoire Arabo-Africaine, Cermodi, Zaghouan
- 1994: Etudes d'Histoire arabo-ottomane 1453-1918, Cermodi, Zaghouan
- 1995: Bibliographie Générale d'Etudes Morisques, ISBN 978-9973719454
- 1996: Correspondances du Grand Vizir Khayreddine: L'Histoire Tunisienne entre la Réalité et les Interprétations Erronées, Tome I
- 1996: Etudes sur les relations Islamo-Chretiennes, Fondation Temimi pour la Recherche Scientifique et l'Information, ISBN 978-9973719645
- 1997: Imperial Legacy, Columbia University Press, ISBN 978-0231103053
- 1999: Crise de la Recherche en Sciences Humaines en Tunisie et dans les Pays Arabes, ISBN 978-9973719904
- 1999: Cultures Et Conscience Nationale Dans Le Monde Arabe Contemporain, Fondation Temimi, ISBN 978-9973719898
- 1999: Etudes et Documents d'Histoire Maghrébine à l'Epoque Moderne
- 1999: Mélanges Maria Soledad Carrasco Urgoti, Zaghouan, Fondation Temimi pour la recherche scientifique et l'information
- 1999: Melanges prof. Machiel Kiel, Fondation Temimi pour la Recherche Scientifique et l'Information, ISBN 978-9973719911
- 1999: Projets d'Histoire Générale des Arabes: Ambitions et Echecs
- 2002: In the Lands of the Christians: Arabic Travel Writing in the 17th Century, Routledge, ISBN 978-0415932288
- 2002: Index Islamicus 2002: A Biography Of Books, Articles And Reviews On Islam And The Muslim World Which Were published In The Year 2002; With Additions From 1993-2001, Brill, ISBN 978-9004142831
- 2003: The Regency of Tunis and the Ottoman Porte, 1777-1814: Army and Government of a North-African Eyâlet at the End of the Eighteenth Century, Routledge, ISBN 978-0415297813
- 2004: A History of Modern Tunisia, Cambridge University Press, ISBN 978-0521009720
- 2005: Covert Gestures: Crypto-Islamic Literature as Cultural Practice in Early Modern Spain, University of Minnesota Press, ISBN 978-0816644759
- 2005: Muslims in Spain, 1500 to 1614, University Of Chicago Press, ISBN 978-0226319636
- 2007: From Muslim to Christian Granada: Inventing a City's Past in Early Modern Spain, The Johns Hopkins University Press, ISBN 978-0801885235
- 2008: Europe Through Arab Eyes, 1578-1727, Columbia University Press, ISBN 978-0231141949
- 2008: Un regard constantinois t.2; suite aux confessions d'un archiviste algérien, Societé des Ecrivains, ISBN 978-2748042139
- 2009: The Administration of Sickness: Medicine and Ethics in Nineteenth-Century Algeria, Palgrave Macmillan, ISBN 978-0230500433
- 2010: Death in Babylon: Alexander the Great and Iberian Empire in the Muslim Orient, University Of Chicago Press, ISBN 978-0226037363
- 2011: Tragédie de l'expulsion morisque : attitudes espagnoles et arabo-islamiques, Zaghouan, Fondation Temimi pour la recherche scientifique et l'information
- 2012: Habib Bourguiba. Père fondateur de la Tunisie moderne et la fin d'un mythe, Zaghouan, Fondation Temimi pour la recherche scientifique et l'information
- 2014: Approche de l'histoire tunisienne et maghrébine du temps présent, Zaghouan, Fondation Temimi pour la recherche scientifique et l'information
- 2015: Leaderships maghrébins et machréquins et leur rôle dans l'histoire moderne et contemporaine, Zaghouan, Fondation Temimi pour la recherche scientifique et l'information
- 2016: Mes contributions à l'histoire de la révolution et de la mémoire nationale, Zaghouan, Fondation Temimi pour la recherche scientifique et l'information
- 2017: La Tunisie et le tournant 1969 à la lumière des archives de la police politique, Zaghouan, Fondation Temimi pour la recherche scientifique et l'information
- 2017: Pour la défense de la révolution tunisienne, Zaghouan, Fondation Temimi pour la recherche scientifique et l'information
