= Fondation Temimi pour la recherche scientifique et l'information =

Research institute in Tunisia

The Fondation Temimi pour la recherche scientifique et l'information (Temimi Foundation for Scientific Research and Information) (Arabic: مؤسسة التميمي للبحث العلمي والمعلومات) is a Tunisian private research institution founded by historian Abdeljelil Temimi, which specializes in human and social sciences. It is cited as "the first private academic foundation in the Arab world serving researchers and organizing conferences".

== History ==
The project began in 1974, with the publication of the first issue of a journal of history. From 1981, Abdeljelil Temimi organized a Congress on the Ottomans and the Moors, until the founding in 1985 of a research center based in Zaghouan dedicated to Ottoman and Moorish research, documentation and information. In 1995, the center took its current name. In November 2004, the headquarters of the foundation moved to Tunis.

The foundation works towards building a bibliographic database covering the modern and contemporary history of Tunisia, strengthening scientific collaboration between Arab and Turkish researchers, and the publication of journals. As of 2013 the foundation had organized 122 conferences.
