= Iceland–Palestine relations =

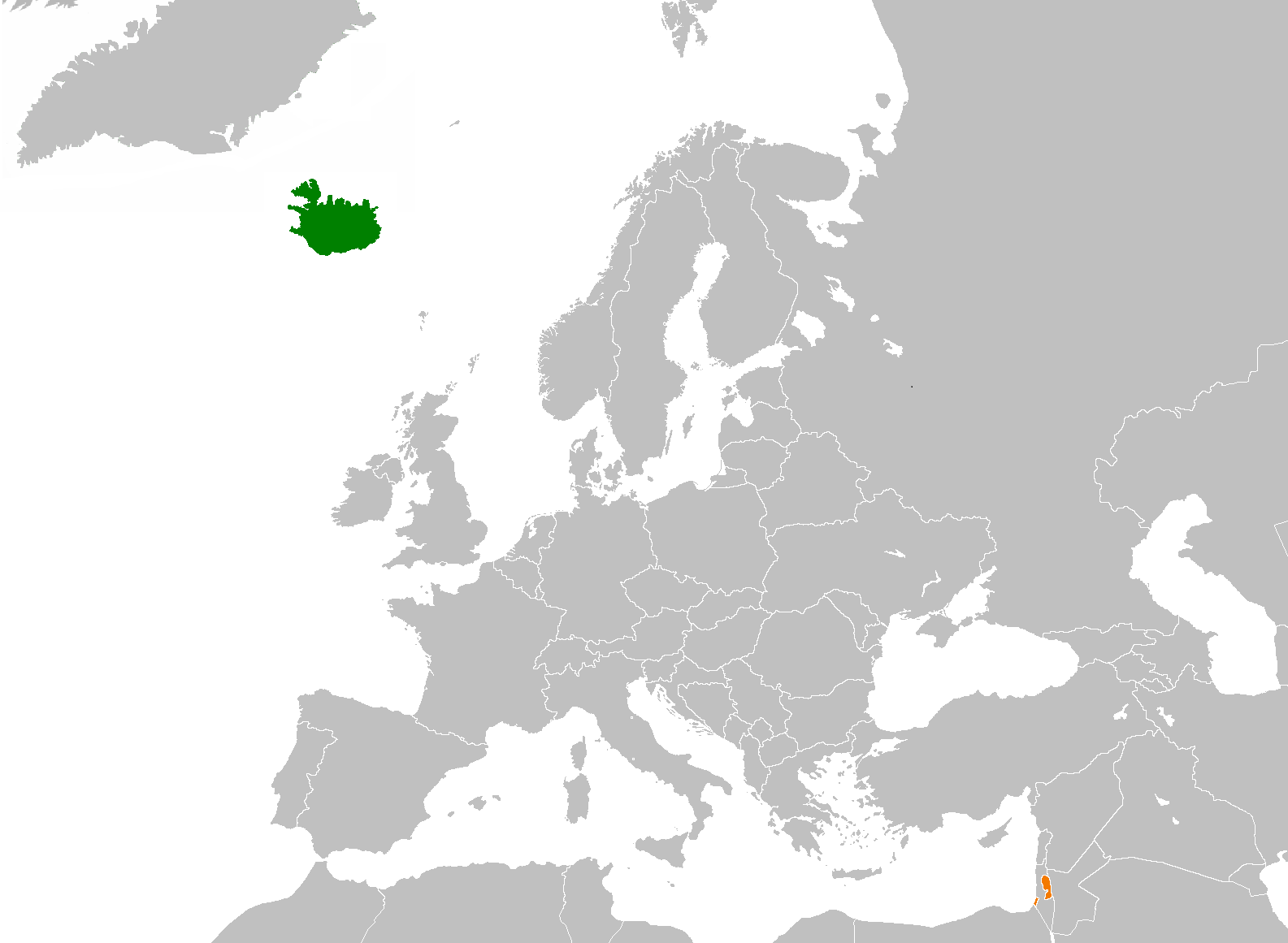

- Iceland: Palestine

Iceland–Palestine relations refers to the bilateral relations between Iceland and Palestine. Iceland was the first Nordic and Western Country to recognise the independence of Palestine. Full diplomatic relations exist between the two sides. Iceland's representative to Palestine is a non-resident based at the Ministry for Foreign Affairs in Reykjavík, while Palestine's ambassador to Iceland is also a non-resident based in Oslo, Norway.

== Background ==
Iceland has had the NGO The Iceland-Palestine Association (Félagið Ísland-Palestína) since 1987. According to its website, the association "supports the Palestinian struggle against occupation and refugees' right of return". On May 18, 1989, the Icelandic parliament resolved to endorse the Association's major goals, including both Israel's right to existence and the claim of Palestinians to nationhood.

Prominent Palestinians in Iceland and Icelanders of Palestinian heritage include:

- Salmann Tamimi, the head of the Icelandic Muslim Association, who came to Iceland in 1971.
- Salmann's sister Amal Tamimi, 'a Palestinian who came to Iceland in 1995 as a stateless person', who is the second foreign-born person (and the first foreign-born woman) to sit in the Icelandic parliament (a substitute for Lúdvík Geirsson in 2011 and for Katrín Júlíusdóttir in 2012).
- Amal's daughter Falasteen Abu Lidbeh, who in 2008 became the first immigrant elected to Reykjavík City Council.
- The poet Mazen Maarouf, who came to Iceland in 2011 through the International Cities of Refuge Network and in 2013 was offered Icelandic citizenship; much of his work has been translated into Icelandic.

In 2008, Iceland received 29 Palestinian refugees from the refugee camp at Al-Waleed in Iraq; their experiences were chronicled in particular by Sigríður Víðis Jónsdóttir. The arrival prompted negative reactions from a few Icelandic politicians, which Bergljót Soffía Kristjánsdóttir has interpreted as an example of rising xenophobia in Iceland.

== Recognition ==
On 29 November 2011, the parliament of Iceland passed a resolution that authorized the government to officially recognize the state of Palestine within the 1967 borders, with 38 members of the 63-seat parliament voting in favor. Össur Skarphéðinsson, Minister for Foreign Affairs of Iceland, formally declared Iceland's recognition of the state of Palestine on December 15, 2011. Riyad Al-Maliki, the Foreign Minister of Palestine, visited Iceland to receive the diplomatic note in person and noted on that occasion that Iceland's recognition was important as Palestine was now recognized for the first time by a Western and northern European country. On May 19, 2019, the Icelandic band Hatari endorsed the Palestinian cause during the final of the Eurovision Song Contest held in Tel Aviv, Israel.

== Reykjavík City Council attempt to boycott Israeli goods ==
On 15 September 2015, Reykjavík City Council voted to boycott Israeli goods in municipal purchasing, in response to a motion tabled by Björk Vilhelmsdóttir. At the time of the vote, it was not yet clear whether the policy could successfully be implemented in terms of Icelandic law. The move provoked swift and at times vitriolic criticism from supporters of Israel's handling of the Palestinian question, and on 23 September an extraordinary Reykjavík City Council meeting was called to withdraw the proposal. The withdrawal was approved unanimously at the Mayor's request. The government of Iceland had immediately distanced itself from the motion, and Prime Minister Sigmundur Davíð Gunnlaugsson called it "ridiculous".

== Gaza War ==
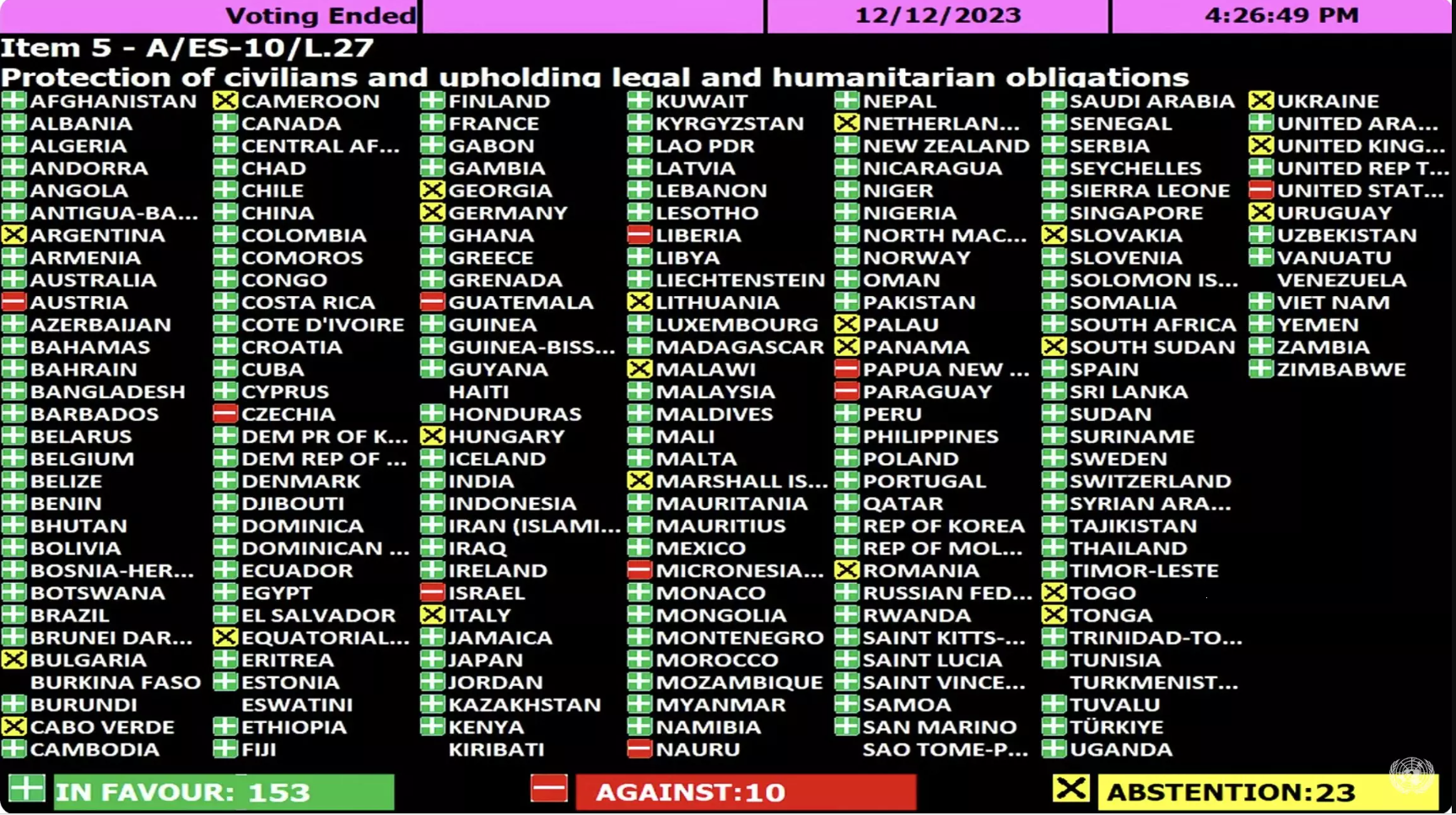
153 countries, including Iceland, supported the resolution calling for a ceasefire in Gaza that was overwhelmingly passed by the UN General Assembly on 12 December 2023

As a response to the Gaza War, Icelandic Foreign Minister Þórdís Kolbrún R. Gylfadóttir condemned the attack and said that Israel has the right to defend itself. The Althing agreed that an emergency humanitarian ceasefire in the Gaza Strip should be implemented to ensure the safety of people, including Palestinians and Israelis. It called for the observance of international law for humanitarian grounds, for the protection of civilian infrastructure, and for the condemnation of any acts of violence against civilians.

On 27 October 2023, Iceland abstained from voting for a United Nations General Assembly resolution calling for a humanitarian truce in Gaza since the decision goes against both Prime Minister Katrín Jakobsdóttir's party's policy and Iceland's foreign policy toward Palestine. According to Prime Minister Katrín Jakobsdóttir, she was not consulted during the decision-making process. On 12 December 2023, Iceland decided to co-sponsor and hence vote in favor of Egypt's resolution.

== See also ==
- Foreign relations of Iceland
- Foreign relations of Palestine
- Iceland–Israel relations
