= Fimmbræðra saga =

Fimmbræðra saga ('the saga of the five brothers') is an Icelandic romance-saga by the priest Jón Oddsson Hjaltalín (1749–1835). It has been characterised as Jón's most ambitious work, and 'in many ways the most interesting of the sagas which Jón authored, first and foremost because he was more successful here than in any other saga in combining influences from a great many different sources, local and foreign, ancient and new'.

== Summary ==
In the summary of M. J. Driscoll,

Jarl Addoníus of Dalmaría has five sons, Abel, Endor, Dathan, Símon and Kristófer, whom he has instructed in the arts and sciences, sports and languages, in all of which they excel. The earl, who is himself a Christian, sees that the brothers are attracted to a variety of religious beliefs, and asks each to explain what beliefs he holds. Abel, the eldest, says he follows the religion preached by Zoroaster, Endor claims to believe in Óðinn, Dathan in Muhammad, and Símon in Judaism, which Kristófer, the most intelligent and learned of the brothers, says he is a follower of the teachings of Jesus Christ. Addoníus decides that each of the brothers should journey to the land where his religion is practised, spend seven years there learning about the religion in question[,] and then return home to tell the others what he has discovered. The saga then follows each of the brothers in turn, ending with Kristófer, who, not surprisingly, is the most successful.

Jón's sources include prominently the Old Norse Völuspá and Heimskringla, and the Almindelig Kirke-Historie and Helte-Historier by Ludvig Holberg, while the overall premise of comparing religions seems to be inspired by Zadig, by Voltaire, which Jón also adapted into Icelandic.

== Editions ==
- 'Fimmbræðra saga', in Fjórar sögur frá hendi Jóns Oddssonar Hjaltalín, ed. by M. J. Driscoll, Rit, 66 (Reykjavík: Stofnun Árna Magnússonar á Íslandi, 2006), pp. 136-71 (freely accessible in modernised spelling as part of the Icelandic Parsed Historical Corpus).

== Manuscripts ==
- Reykjavík, National Library, Lbs 3810 8vo (1870, Sigurður Jósepsson Hjaltalín 1822-98)
- Sauðárkróki, Héraðskjalasafn Skagfirðinga, HSk 650 4to (1874, Kristján Ívarsson 1830-1900)
