= Mohammed Tamim =

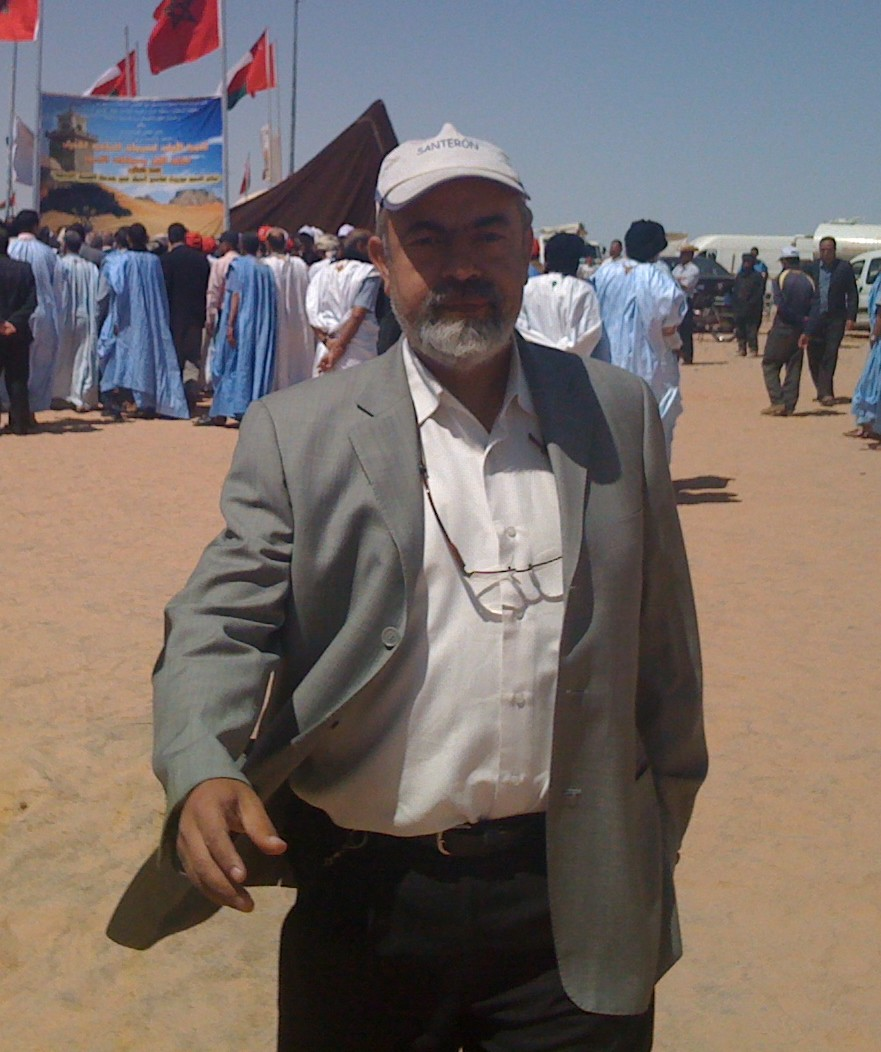
- Born: May 30, 1958 (age 68); Casablanca
- Occupations: Architect, researcher in development economics, writer.
- Writing career
- Language: French
- Genres: Essays, novels, news articles.
- Notable works: Le spectre du tiers-monde : l'éducation pour le développement. Le Spectre de l'Islamisme; Ulrich, histoire d'un Arabe néonazi Le général Kanem-Borbou ou l'Afrique Noire est bien partie L'étrange Histoire de Maria D.
- Website: www.mohammedtamim.net

Mohammed Tamim (in Arabic: محمد تمبم) is an architect, researcher in development economics, and Moroccan francophone writer born in 1958 in Casablanca. He lives in Laâyoune.

== Biography ==
Mohammed Tamim is from a family with origins in Chinguetti, Mauritania. After primary school studies at the Catholic school Charles de Foucauld, followed by Lycée Lyautey in Casablanca, Mohammed Tamim enrolled at Gesamthochschule Kassel in Germany, graduating as an architect-engineer. After several months working in civil service in Al Hoceïma (Morocco), he was recruited to serve as municipal architect for the city of Laâyoune. During a university project studying the shantytown (or bidonville) Benmsik in Casablanca, he discovered that the term bidonville was first utilized in Morocco. He later discovered that the origins of this type of living environment, among other characteristics of the Third World, can be first found in England during the Industrial Revolution.

== Architectural Work ==
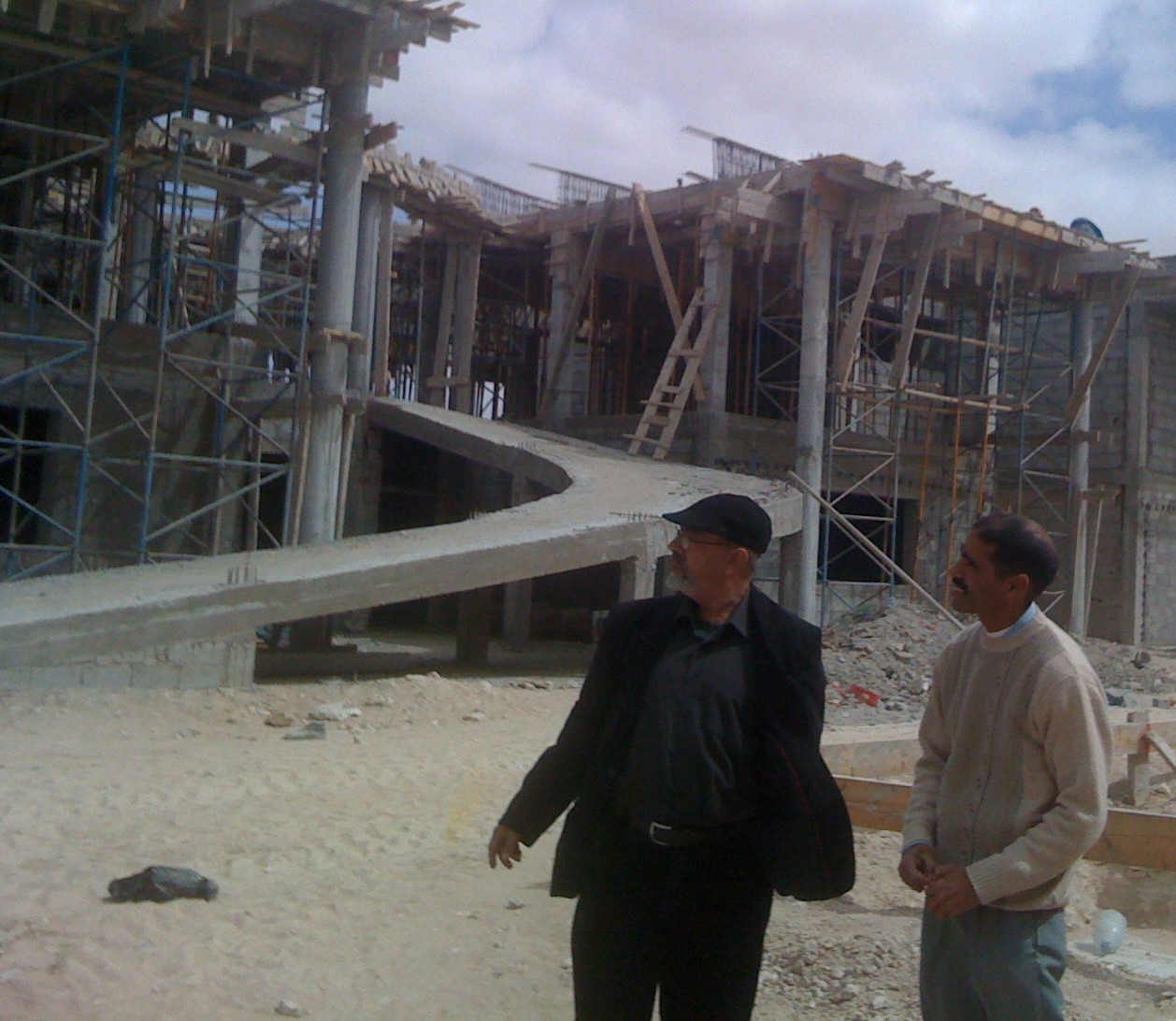
Mohammed Tamim visiting construction of a school complex in Laayoune

As an architect working in Laâyoune, Mohammed Tamim focused on restructuring the city's former colonial quarters known as Colomina; safeguarding the region's historical patrimony through the preservation of churches in Laâyoune and Dakhla; and the preservation of sites of Sahrawi cultural heritage such as Zawiya Shaykh Malainine. He also built many schools, both public and private. More recently, he committed his association SaharaGreen to the development of renewable energy in the Saharan provinces. (See photos.)

== Theses on Economic Development ==
- The origin and definition of developing countries: like Walt Whitman Rostow, Mohammed Tamim believes that, beginning with the Industrial Revolution in England during the 18th and 19th centuries, developing countries can be defined as countries in transition from various traditional ways of life toward the modern way of life.
- Development indicator: The development of a country can be measured by its level of modern education. The level of school enrollment is proportional to the level of economic development and is inversely proportional to the level of demographic growth. Economic development here being measured by the proportion of the labor force active in modern sectors, as well as life expectancy.
- Demographic growth: Triggered by vaccination campaigns, demographic growth constituted a major obstacle to the generalization of school enrollment in developing countries and, by association, to development itself.
- The condition of possibility for Walt Whitman Rostow's Take Off: The economic take-off of developing countries requires the generalization of school enrollment from primary school through university.
- The foresight of leaders: The Meiji Emperor was the first great strategist of development in history. The success of development politics depends upon the foresight of leaders such as Habib Bourguiba in Tunisia, Lee Kuan Yew in Singapore, Deng Xiaoping in China, Mahathir Mohamad in Malaysia, Park Chung-hee in South Korea, Seretse Khama and Ketumile Masire in Botswana, Paul Kagame in Rwanda, etc.
- The strategy of universal development: The generalization of education and to that end, birth control.
- UN reform, the chance or the international community: The chance may wear at the head of each developing country a man of vision and integrity. But these probabilities are negligible. Such a strategy can only be realized through universal solidarity, such as UN reform.

== Themes in Literary Work ==
Through the following works of literature, Mohammed Tamim has illustrated the principle themes of his economic research on development :

- The overpopulation of shantytowns is illustrated by L'étrange histoire de Maria D., a play that follows the travails of Maria, a young woman living in a bidonville and pregnant with her seventh child.
- Immigration and racism in Ulrich, l'histoire d'un Arabe néonazi, the story of a blond Arab fascinated by Nazi ideology who establishes and leads a neo-Nazi organization.
- Development politics in The Général Kanem-Bornous, ou l'Afrique est bien partie, the story of an African general who, thanks to an effective development policy, transforms his territory into a highly developed region despite his country's president, a corrupt psychopath who confuses Whites with Albino blacks.
- Corruption and poor governance in Laâyoune-Plage.
- The study of Islamist movements in Le specter de l'islamisme.
- Homosexuality in a religious world in Nabil Haddad.
- The difficulty of growing old and losing one's youth and beauty in Alain Ledon, etc.

The first chapters of each of these works can be read on his site: www.mohammedtamim.net.

== Publications by Mohammed Tamim ==
- Das Gespenst der Dritten-Welt. Berlin: Hoering Verlag, 1982.
- Berberische Briefe. Berlin: Hoering Verlag, 1984.
- Le Spectre du tiers-monde. Paris: L’Harmattan, 2002. ISBN 2-7475-2260-1
- Ulrich, l’histoire d’un Arabe néonazi. Nantes: Sol’Air, 2004. ISBN 2-915500-69-X
- L’étrange Histoire de Maria D. Nantes: Sol’Air, 2005. ISBN 2-915500-70-3
- Appel à l’Internationale écologiste. Nantes: Sol’Air, 2006. ISBN 2-915500-68-1
- Seducere. Nantes: Sol’Air, 2007.
- Nabil Haddad. Nantes: Sol’Air, 2008.
- La théorie du développement pour le Millénaire. Laâyoune: GreenSahara, 2009.
- Le Général Kanem-Bornou, ou l’Afrique est bien partie. Laâyoune: GreenSahara, 2010.
- Le Colonel Buhari. Laâyoune: GreenSahara, 2011.
- Le Spectre de l’islamisme. Laâyoune: GreenSahara, 2011.
- Alain Ledon. Laâyoune: GreenSahara, 2012.
- Laâyoune-Plage. Laâyoune: GreenSahara, 2013.
