= Baghdad attack =

Baghdad attack may refer to:

- 1950–51 Baghdad bombings
- 2003 Canal Hotel bombing
- 2003 Baghdad DHL attempted shootdown incident
- 2003 Jordanian embassy bombing in Baghdad
- 2004 Ashura bombings in Iraq, including Baghdad
- 17 August 2005 Baghdad bombings
- 14 September 2005 Baghdad bombings
- 2006 Buratha mosque bombing
- 1 July 2006 Sadr City bombing
- 23 November 2006 Sadr City bombings
- 2007 Mustansiriya University bombings
- 22 January 2007 Baghdad bombings
- 3 February 2007 Baghdad market bombing
- 12 February 2007 Baghdad bombings
- 18 February 2007 Baghdad bombings
- 29 March 2007 Baghdad bombings
- 2007 Iraqi Parliament bombing
- 18 April 2007 Baghdad bombings
- 19 June 2007 al-Khilani Mosque bombing
- 26 July 2007 Baghdad market bombing
- 1 August 2007 Baghdad bombings
- 1 February 2008 Baghdad bombings
- 6 March 2008 Baghdad bombing
- 17 June 2008 Baghdad bombing
- 28 September 2008 Baghdad bombings
- 8 March 2009 Baghdad police recruitment centre bombing
- 6 April 2009 Baghdad bombings
- 23 April 2009 Iraqi suicide attacks
- 24 June 2009 Baghdad bombing
- 19 August 2009 Baghdad bombings
- 25 October 2009 Baghdad bombings
- 8 December 2009 Baghdad bombings
- 25 January 2010 Baghdad bombings
- 1 February 2010 Baghdad bombing
- 4 April 2010 Baghdad bombings
- 6 April 2010 Baghdad bombings
- April 2010 Baghdad bombings
- 10 May 2010 Iraq attacks
- 20 June 2010 Baghdad bombings
- July 2010 Baghdad bombing
- 17 August 2010 Baghdad bombings
- 19 September 2010 Baghdad attacks
- 2010 Baghdad church massacre
- 2 November 2010 Baghdad bombings
- 24 January 2011 Iraq bombings, including Baghdad
- 27 January 2011 Baghdad bombing
- 28 August 2011 Baghdad bombing
- October 2011 Baghdad bombings
- 22 December 2011 Baghdad bombings
- 5 January 2012 Iraq bombings
- 27 January 2012 Baghdad bombing
- 23 February 2012 Iraq attacks, including Baghdad
- 13 June 2012 Iraq attacks, including Baghdad
- 9 September 2012 Iraq attacks, including Baghdad
- 19 March 2013 Iraq attacks
- 18 April 2013 Baghdad bombing
- 27 May 2013 Baghdad bombings
- 21 September 2013 Iraq attacks, centering in Baghdad
- 2013 Iraq Christmas Day bombings, Baghdad
- February 2015 Baghdad bombings
- 2015 Baghdad market truck bombing
- January 2016 Iraq attacks
- February 2016 Baghdad bombings
- April 2016 Baghdad bombing
- 11 May 2016 Baghdad bombings
- 17 May 2016 Baghdad bombings
- 2016 Karrada bombing
- 9 September 2016 Baghdad bombings
- October 2016 Baghdad attacks
- December 2016 Baghdad bombings
- January 2017 Baghdad bombings
- Al-Faqma ice cream parlor bombing
- January 2018 Baghdad bombings
- 2019-20 Attack on the United States embassy in Baghdad
- 2020 Camp Taji attacks, north of Baghdad

== See also ==
- Baghdad bombing (disambiguation)
- Siege of Baghdad (1258)
- Battle of Baghdad (2003)
