= Baghdad bombing =

A large number of bombings have taken place in Baghdad, especially since the beginning of the Iraq War. Wikipedia has individual articles on the following attacks:

1950s

- 1950–51 Baghdad bombings

2003

- 2003 Jordanian embassy bombing in Baghdad
- Canal Hotel bombing
- 27 October 2003 Baghdad bombings

2004

- 2004 Ashura bombings in Iraq

2005

- 17 August 2005 Baghdad bombings
- 14 September 2005 Baghdad bombings

2006

- Buratha Mosque bombing
- 1 July 2006 Sadr City bombing
- 23 November 2006 Sadr City bombings

2007

- Mustansiriya University bombings
- 22 January 2007 Baghdad bombings
- 3 February 2007 Baghdad market bombing
- 12 February 2007 Baghdad bombings
- 18 February 2007 Baghdad bombings
- 29 March 2007 Baghdad bombings
- 2007 Iraqi Parliament bombing
- 18 April 2007 Baghdad bombings
- 19 June 2007 al-Khilani Mosque bombing
- 26 July 2007 Baghdad market bombing
- 1 August 2007 Baghdad bombings

2008

- 1 February 2008 Baghdad bombings
- 6 March 2008 Baghdad bombing
- 17 June 2008 Baghdad bombing
- 28 September 2008 Baghdad bombings

2009

- 8 March 2009 Baghdad police recruitment centre bombing
- 6 April 2009 Baghdad bombings
- 23 April 2009 Iraqi suicide attacks
- 24 June 2009 Baghdad bombing
- 19 August 2009 Baghdad bombings
- 25 October 2009 Baghdad bombings
- 8 December 2009 Baghdad bombings

2010

- 25 January 2010 Baghdad bombings
- 1 February 2010 Baghdad bombing
- 4 April 2010 Baghdad bombings
- 6 April 2010 Baghdad bombings
- April 2010 Baghdad bombings
- 10 May 2010 Iraq attacks
- 20 June 2010 Baghdad bombings
- July 2010 Baghdad bombing
- 17 August 2010 Baghdad bombings
- 19 September 2010 Baghdad attacks
- 2010 Baghdad church massacre
- 2 November 2010 Baghdad bombings

2011

- 24 January 2011 Iraq bombings
- 27 January 2011 Baghdad bombing
- 28 August 2011 Baghdad bombing
- October 2011 Baghdad bombings
- 22 December 2011 Baghdad bombings

2012

- 5 January 2012 Iraq bombings
- 27 January 2012 Baghdad bombing
- 23 February 2012 Iraq attacks
- 13 June 2012 Iraq attacks
- 9 September 2012 Iraq attacks

2013

- 19 March 2013 Iraq attacks
- 18 April 2013 Baghdad bombing
- 27 May 2013 Baghdad bombings
- 21 September 2013 Iraq attacks
- 2013 Iraq Christmas Day bombings

2015

- February 2015 Baghdad bombings
- 2015 Baghdad market truck bombing

2016

- January 2016 Iraq attacks
- February 2016 Baghdad bombings
- April 2016 Baghdad bombing
- 11 May 2016 Baghdad bombings
- 17 May 2016 Baghdad bombings
- 2016 Karrada bombing
- 9 September 2016 Baghdad bombings
- October 2016 Baghdad attacks
- December 2016 Baghdad bombings

2017

- January 2017 Baghdad bombings
- Al-Faqma ice cream parlor bombing

2018

- January 2018 Baghdad bombings

2019

- Attack on the United States embassy in Baghdad

2020

- 2020 Camp Taji attacks

2021

- January 2021 Baghdad bombings
