= Timeline of Baghdad =

Coordinates: 33.325°N 44.422°E

The following is a timeline of the history of the city of Baghdad, Iraq.

1. 2000 BCE – Babylonian city of Baghdadu in existence (approximate date).
2. 762 CE
  - Round City construction begins per Abbasid Caliph al-Mansur.
  - Al-Khassakiyya mosque built.
3. 767 – Al-Mansur Mosque built.
4. 775 – Bab al-Taq (gate) built.
5. 786 – Harun al-Rashid in power.
6. 794 – Paper mill in operation.
7. 799 – Mashhad al-Kazimiyya built.
8. 812-813 Siege of Baghdad, Fourth Fitna (Islamic Civil War)
9. 814 – City captured by al-Ma'mun.
10. 827 – Tomb of Zobeide built.
11. 836 – Abbasid Caliphate of Al-Mu'tasim relocated from Baghdad to Samarra.
12. 850 – Book of Ingenious Devices published.
13. 855 – Funeral of Ahmad ibn Hanbal.
14. 861 – 11 December: Caliph Al-Mutawakkil assassinated.
15. 865 – City wall built.
16. 865-866 Caliphal Civil War, was an armed conflict during the "Anarchy at Samarra" between the rival caliphs al-Musta'in and al-Mu'tazz.
17. 892 – Abbasid Caliphate of Al-Mu'tamid relocated to Baghdad from Samarra.
18. 901 – Jami al-Qasr (mosque) built.
19. 908 – Al-Khulafa Mosque built.
20. 946 – Battle of Baghdad; Shia Buyids in power.
21. 993 – Dar al-'Ilm (educational institution) founded.
22. 1055 – Seljuq Nizam al-Mulk in power.
23. 1060 – Dar al-Kutub (library) founded.
24. 1066 – Abu Hanifa Mosque restored.
25. 1067 – Nizamiyya of Baghdad (college) established.
26. 1095 – City wall rebuilt.
27. 1157 - Siege of Baghdad, Abbasid–Seljuq Wars
28. 1180 – Caliph al-Nasir in power.
29. 1193 – Jami' Zumurrud Khatun (mosque) and Turbat Zumurrud Khatun (tomb) built.
30. 1202 – Minaret of Jami' al-Khaffafin built (approximate date).
31. 1215 – Tomb of Maruf el-Kerkhi built.
32. 1221 – Bab al-Talsim (Talisman gate) built.
33. 1226 - al-Baghdadi compiles Kitab al-Tabikh (1226) (cookbook).
34. 1228 – Jami' al-Qumriyya Mosque built.
35. 1230 – Al-Qasr al-Abbasi fi al-Qal'a built (approximate date).
36. 1232 – Al-Mustansiriya Madrasah established.
37. 1252 – Shrine of Abdul-Kadir built.
38. 1258 – January–February: City destroyed by forces of Mongol Hulagu Khan during the Siege of Baghdad; most of population killed.
39. 1272 – Marco Polo visits city (approximate date).
40. 1326 – Ibn Battuta visits city.
41. 1357 – Al-Madrasah al-Mirjaniyya built.
42. 1358 – Khan al-Mirjan built.
43. 1393 – City captured by Timur.
44. 1401 – City captured by Timur again.
45. 1405 – Sultan Ahmed Jalayir in power.
46. 1417 – City taken by Qara Yusuf.
47. 1430 - Citadel of Baghdad built
48. 1468 – Aq Qoyunlu in power.

== 16th–19th centuries ==
1. 1508 - City taken by Persian Ismail I.
2. 1534
  - Capture of Baghdad by Ottomans.
  - Mausoleum of Abdul-Qadir al-Gilani built.
3. 1535 – City becomes capital of the Baghdad Eyalet of the Ottoman Empire.
4. 1544 – City taken by forces of Suleiman I.
5. 1578 – Al-Muradiyya Mosque built.
6. 1601 – Coffeehouse built.
7. 1602 – City taken by forces of Abbas I of Persia.
8. 1623 – 23 January: Capture of Baghdad by Safavids.
9. 1625 - Siege of Baghdad, Unsuccessful siege of Baghdad by Ottomans
10. 1630 - Siege of Baghdad, Second Unsuccessful siege of Baghdad by Ottomans
11. 1638 – Capture of Baghdad by forces of Ottoman Murad IV.
12. 1682 – Khaseki mosque built.
13. 1683 – City besieged.
14. 1780 – Mamluk Sulayman Pasha the Great in power.
15. 1795 – Mosque-Madrasa of al-Ahmadiyya built.
16. 1799 – City besieged by Wahhabi-Saudi forces.
17. 1816 – Mamluk Dawud Pasha in power.
18. 1823 – Population: 80,000 (estimate).
19. 1826 – Haydar-Khana Mosque constructed in its current form.
20. 1830
  - British East Indian Company in residence (approximate date).
  - Plague.
21. 1831 – Flood, then famine.
22. 1841 – Lynch Brothers in business.
23. 1848 – Roman Catholic Archdiocese of Baghdad established.
24. 1849 – Remnants discovered of quay of Nebuchadrezzar, from Babylonian city of Baghdadu.
25. 1861 – Istanbul-Baghdad telegraph line installed.
26. 1865
  - Basrah-Baghdad telegraph line installed.
  - Alliance Israélite boys' school established.
27. 1869 – Midhat Pasha in power.
28. 1870
  - Municipal council established.
  - City walls demolished.
29. 1871 – Population: 65,000.
30. 1880 – Turkish camel post begins operating (approximate date).
31. 1895 – Population: 100,000 (estimate).
32. 1899 – Alliance Israélite girls' school established.

== 20th century ==
=== 1900s–1940s ===
1. 1908 – Population: 140,000 (estimate).
2. 1909 – Cinema built.
3. 1911 – Ottoman XIII Corps headquartered in Baghdad.
4. 1912 – Population: 200,000 (estimate).
5. 1914 – October: Samarra-Baghdad railway begins operating.
6. 1915
  - Istanbul-Baghdad railway begins operating.
  - Al-Rasheed Street laid out.
  - Cholera epidemic.
7. 1917
  - March: Fall of Baghdad (1917); British in power.
  - Cinema opens.
  - Rasheed Street becomes the first to be electrically illuminated in Iraq
1. 1919 – Guardians of Independence organized.
2. 1920
  - City becomes capital of the British Mandate of Iraq.
  - Iraqi revolt against the British.
  - Maktabat al-Salam (library) established.
3. 1926 – Baghdad Antiquities Museum founded.
4. 1927 – British Imperial Airways begins operating Cairo-Baghdad-Basra flights.
5. 1929 – Al-Maktabatil Aammah (public library) active.
6. 1931 – Strike.
7. 1932 – Third Eastern Women's Congress is held.
8. 1936 – Military coup.
9. 1940 – Iraqi Music Institute inaugurated.
10. 1941 - Iraqi coup d'état in Baghdad, World War II
11. 1941
  - May: Anglo-Iraqi War.
  - June: Farhud (pogrom against Jews).
12. 1944 – Baghdad Symphony Orchestra founded.
13. 1946 – Al-Sarafiya bridge built.
14. 1947 - Population: 352,137.
15. 1948
  - Uprising.
  - Popular Theatre Company and filmmaking Studio of Baghdad formed.

22. 1948 - Jewish exodus from Arab and Muslim countries

=== 1950s–1990s ===
1. 1952
  - Uprising.
  - Modern Theatre Company formed.
2. 1953 – Baghdad Central Station built.
3. 1956
  - Samarra Barrage constructed on the Tigris River near the city.
  - May: Government television begins broadcasting.
  - Uprising.
  - Iraqi Artists Society formed.
4. 1957
  - University of Baghdad established.
  - Demonstration.
5. 1958
  - 14 July: Iraqi coup d'état against king Faisal II at Royal Palace.
  - City becomes capital of the Republic of Iraq.
6. 1959
  - Revolution City built.
  - Al-Mabda' newspaper begins publication.
  - Unknown Soldier monument erected on Firdos Square.
7. 1960 – September: OPEC founded at Baghdad Conference (Iran, Iraq, Kuwait, Saudi Arabia, Venezuela).
8. 1961 – Iraq National Library and Archive established.
9. 1963
  - 8–10 February: Iraqi coup d'état.
  - Khulafa Central Mosque built.
  - Al-Mustansiriya University and Al-Rasheed Sport Club established.
10. 1964 – Al-Yarmouk Teaching Hospital established.
11. 1965 - Population: 1,490,759 city; 1,657,424 urban agglomeration.
12. 1966
  - Film festival held at Al-Rashid Cinema.
  - Al-Shaab Stadium and Martyrs' Mosque built.
13. 1967 – Firqat Ittahaad al-Fannaaneed theatre group formed.
14. 1968 – National Theatre Company established.
15. 1970 - Population: 1,984,142 (estimate).
16. 1971 – Baghdad Zoo opens.
17. 1975 – Central Post Office built.
18. 1978 – November: Arab League summit.
19. 1980
  - Iran–Iraq War begins.
  - Film school of the Institute of Fine Arts established.
20. 1981 – National Film Center and Saddam Hussein Gymnasium (now Baghdad Gymnasium) built.
21. 1982
  - Saddam International Airport, Al Rasheed Hotel, Palestine Meridien Hotel, and Baghdad Conference Palace built.
  - Ishtar Sheraton Hotel opens.
  - The Monument to the Unknown Soldier inaugurated.
22. 1983 – Al-Shaheed Monument built.
23. 1985
  - Baghdad Festival of Arab theatre begins.
  - Amanat Al Assima Housing complex and Central Bank of Iraq building constructed.
24. 1987 - Population: 3,841,268.
25. 1988 – Saddam University established.
26. 1989 – Victory Arch erected.
27. 1991
  - Gulf War.
  - 13 February: Amiriyah shelter bombing.
28. 1993 – 26 June: Missile strikes by United States.
29. 1994 – Baghdad Tower constructed.

== 21st century ==
=== 2000s ===
- 2002 – April: Statue of Saddam Hussein erected in Firdos Square.
- 2003
  - 3–12 April: Battle of Baghdad (2003); United States in power; Green Zone established.
  - 9 April: Firdos Square statue destruction.
  - 7 August: Jordanian embassy bombing.
  - 19 August: Canal Hotel bombing.
  - 27 October: Bombings.
- 2004
  - 2 March: Ashura bombings.
  - 29 May: Alaa al-Tamimi becomes mayor.
  - 25 August: Baghdad International Airport reverts to civilian control.
  - 12 September: Haifa Street helicopter incident.
  - 14 September: Bombing.
- 2005
  - 8 August: Municipal coup d'état.
  - 31 August: 2005 Baghdad bridge stampede.
  - Baghdad International Film Festival begins.
- 2006
  - 22 February: Battle of Baghdad (2006–2008)
  - 7 April: Buratha Mosque bombing.
  - 1 July: Sadr City bombing.
  - 9 July: Hay al Jihad massacre.
  - 23 November: Sadr City bombings.
- 2007
  - 16 January: Mustansiriya University bombings.
  - 22 January: Bombings.
  - 3 February: Market bombing.
  - 14 February: Baghdad Security Plan effected.
  - 18 February: Bombings.
  - 5 March: Mutanabbi Street bombed.
  - 29 March: Bombings.
  - April: Adhamiyah neighborhood Wall construction begins.
  - 26 July: Market bombing.
  - 1 August: Bombings.
- 2008
  - Baghdad Metro resumes operation.
  - 6 March: Bombing.
  - 17 June: Bombing.
- 2009
  - 1 January: Control of Green Zone transferred from US to Iraq.
  - Dismantling of war-time blast walls begins.
  - 19 August: Bombings.

=== 2010s ===
- 2010
  - 17 August: Bombings.
  - Baghdad FC Stadium opens.
- 2012
  - 5 January: Bombings.
  - 27 January: Bombing.
  - 23 February: 23 February 2012 Iraq attacks.
  - 4 June: Bombing of Shia office.
- 2015 - Air pollution in Baghdad reaches annual mean of 88 PM2.5 and 208 PM10, much higher than recommended.
- 2016 - 3 July: Bombing in Karrada.
- 2018 - 10 June: Election ballot warehouse catches fire.
- 2019
  - 1 October: Protests erupted in Baghdad in Liberation Square
  - 7 October: Dozens of protesters were killed and hundreds were injured in Sadr City.
  - 28 October: Safaa Al Sarai killed
  - 14 November: Four people were killed and 62 injured in Baghdad in clashes between security forces and protesters.

=== 2020s ===
- 2020
  - 3 January: Qasem Soleimani was assassinated by a U.S. drone strike near Baghdad International Airport.
- 2021
  - 21 January: Bombings.
  - 24 April: Hospital fire.
  - 25 May: anti-government protests.
  - 19 July: Bombing.

== See also ==
- History of Baghdad
- List of Abbasid Caliphs
- Neighbourhoods of Baghdad
- List of mosques in Baghdad
- Administrative districts in Baghdad (formed in 2003)
- List of hospitals in Baghdad Governorate
- Timelines of other cities in Iraq: Basra, Mosul, Zakho, Samarra

== Bibliography ==
=== Published in 17th–18th centuries ===
- Jean-Baptiste Tavernier (1676). "(Bagdat)". Les Six Voyages (in French). Paris.
- Allain Manesson Mallet (1683), "De la ville de Bagdet", Description de l'univers (in French), Paris: Denys Thierry
- Barthélemy d' Herbelot (1777), "Bagdad", Bibliotheque orientale (in French), The Hague: J. Neaulme & N. van Daalen

=== Published in 19th century ===
- J.B.L.J. Rousseau (1809). Description du pachalik de Bagdad (in French).
- Abraham Rees (1819), "Bagdad", The Cycloppædia, London: Longman, Hurst, Rees, Orme & Brown
- Robert Ker Porter (1821), "(Bagdad)", Travels in Georgia, Persia, Armenia, ancient Babylonia, &c. &c, London: Longman, Hurst, Rees, Orme, and Brown, OCLC 5524754
- Robert Mignan (1829), "(Bagdad)", Travels in Chaldæa, London: H. Colburn and R. Bentley
- David Brewster, ed. (1830). "Bagdad". Edinburgh Encyclopædia. Edinburgh: William Blackwood.
- Anthony Norris Groves (1832), Journal of a residence at Bagdad during the years 1830 and 1831, London: J. Nisbet, OCLC 5000777, OL 13493447M
- "Bagdad". American Magazine of Useful and Entertaining Knowledge. 1. Boston: Boston Bewick Co. 1834. hdl:2027/hvd.hny8ty.
- Josiah Conder (1834), "Bagdad", Dictionary of Geography, Ancient and Modern, London: T. Tegg
- James Raymond Wellsted (1840), "Bagdat", Travels to the City of the Caliphs, along the Shores of the Persian Gulf and the Mediterranean, London: H. Colburn, OCLC 5395027
- Thomas Bartlett (1841). "Bagdad". New Tablet of Memory; or, Chronicle of Remarkable Events. London: Thomas Kelly.
- Theodore Alois Buckley (1862), "Bagdad", Great Cities of the Middle Ages (2nd ed.), London: Routledge, Warne, & Routledge
- George Henry Townsend (1867), "Bagdad", A Manual of Dates (2nd ed.), London: Frederick Warne & Co.
- William Henry Overall, ed. (1870), "Baghdad", Dictionary of Chronology, London: William Tegg, OCLC 2613202
- Grattan Geary (1878), "City of the Caliphs", Through Asiatic Turkey, London: S. Low, Marston, Searle & Rivington, OCLC 4918876
- Ibn Serapion; Guy Le Strange (1895). "Description of Mesopotamia and Baghdad, written about the year 900 AD by Ibn Serapion". Journal of the Royal Asiatic Society. London. hdl:2027/mdp.39015020450659.
- Max Freiherr von Oppenheim (1899), "Baġdād", Vom Mittelmeer zum Persischen Golf (in German), Berlin: D. Reimer (E. Vohsen), OCLC 13166400
- Guy Le Strange (1900), Baghdad during the Abbasid Caliphate, Oxford: Clarendon Press (Bibliography + Index).

=== Published in 20th century ===
- "Bagdad", Chambers's Encyclopaedia, London: W. & R. Chambers, 1901
- Pedro Teixeira (1902), "Concerning the City of Bagdad", The Travels of Pedro Teixeira, translated by William F. Sinclair, London: Printed for the Hakluyt Society
- Al-Khatib al-Baghdadi (1904), L' introduction topographique â l'histoire de Bagdâdh d'Aboû Bakr Aḥmad ibn Thâbit al-Khatîb al-Bagdâdhî (in French), translated by George Salmon, Paris: É. Bouillon, OCLC 23419471, OL 6942714M
- "Bagdad", Jewish Encyclopedia, vol. 2, New York: KTAV Publishing House, 1907
- "Bagdad". Brockhaus' Konversations-Lexikon (in German) (14th ed.). Leipzig: Brockhaus. 1908.
- Benjamin Vincent (1910), "Bagdad", Haydn's Dictionary of Dates (25th ed.), London: Ward, Lock & Co.
- Rawlinson, Henry Creswicke; Peters, John Punnett (1910). "Bagdad (city)" . Encyclopædia Britannica. Vol. 3 (11th ed.). pp. 194–198.
- "Baghdad". Encyclopaedia of Islam. E.J. Brill. 1913. p. 563?+. ISBN 90-04-08265-4.
- Sven Hedin (1918), "Bagdad einst und jetzt", Bagdad, Babylon, Ninive (in German), Leipzig: Brockhaus
- Abu'l-Faraj ibn al-Jawzi (1923–1924). M. Bahjat al-Atharī (ed.). Manāqib Baghdād (in Arabic). Baghdād: Maṭbaʿat Dār al-Salām.
- Freya Stark (1932). Baghdad Sketches.
- Leon E. Seltzer, ed. (1952), "Baghdad", Columbia Lippincott Gazetteer of the World, New York: Columbia University Press, p. 140, OL 6112221M
- Ibn al-Banna; George Makdisi (1956–1957). "Autograph diary of an eleventh-century historian of Baghdad". Bulletin of the School of Oriental and African Studies. 18: 9–31. doi:10.1017/s0041977x00122189. S2CID 246637775.
- "Baghdad", Webster's Geographical Dictionary, Springfield, Massachusetts: G. & C. Merriam Co., 1960, p. 92, OL 5812502M
- J. Gulick (1967). "Baghdad: portrait of a city in physical and cultural change". Journal of the American Institute of Planners. 33 (4): 246–255. doi:10.1080/01944366708977925.
- Jacob Lassner. The Topography of Baghdad in the Early Middle Ages. Detroit: Wayne University Press, 1970.
- Gaston Wiet (1971), Baghdad: metropolis of the Abbasid caliphate, translated by Seymour Feiler, Norman: University of Oklahoma Press, ISBN 0-8061-0922-X
- "Iraq: Baghdad", Middle East, Australia: Lonely Planet, 1994, p. 302+, OL 16516298W
- Hanne, Eric J. "The Caliphate revisited: The Abbasids of eleventh and twelfth century Baghdad" (PhD dissertation, University of Michigan; ProQuest Dissertations Publishing, 1998. 9909898).
- John Block Friedman; Kristen Mossler Figg (2000). "Baghdad". Trade, Travel, and Exploration in the Middle Ages: an Encyclopedia. Routledge. p. 43+. ISBN 978-1-135-59094-9.
- Stefano Bianca (2000), "Baghdad: an Arab Metropolis between Conservation and Redevelopment", Urban form in the Arab world, Verlag der Fachvereine Hochschulverlag AG an der ETH Zurich, ISBN 3-7281-1972-5

=== Published in 21st century ===
- Hoshiar Nooradin (2004). "Globalization and the search for modern local architecture: learning from Baghdad". In Yasser Elsheshtawy (ed.). Planning Middle Eastern Cities: An Urban Kaleidoscope. Routledge. p. 59. ISBN 978-1-134-41010-1.
- Ibn Sayyar al-Warraq (2007). Annals of the Caliphs' Kitchens: Ibn Sayyar al-Warraq's Tenth-Century Baghdadi Cookbook. Translated by Nawal Nasrallah. Brill. ISBN 978-90-04-15867-2.
- Dina Rizk Khoury (2008). "Violence and spatial politics between the local and imperial: Baghdad 1778-1810". In Gyan Prakash; Kevin Michael Kruse (eds.). Spaces of the Modern City: Imaginaries, Politics, and Everyday Life. Princeton University Press. ISBN 978-0-691-13343-0.
- Luc-Normand Tellier (2009). "Baghdad Urbexplosion". Urban World History: An Economic and Geographical Perspective. Presses de l'Université du Québec. p. 195+. ISBN 978-2-7605-2209-1.
- Gabor Agoston; Bruce Alan Masters (2009). "Baghdad". Encyclopedia of the Ottoman Empire. Facts on File. ISBN 978-1-4381-1025-7.
- Mona Damluji (2010). "'Securing Democracy In Iraq': Sectarian Politics and Segregation in Baghdad, 2003-2007". Traditional Dwellings and Settlements Review. 21. International Association for the Study of Traditional Environments – via University of California, Berkeley.
