= Sadr City terrorist attacks =

In the aftermath of the 2003 invasion of Iraq and the subsequent sectarian violence a number of terrorist attacks have targeted the Sadr City district of Baghdad.

These include but are not limited to

- 1 July 2006 Sadr City bombing
- 23 November 2006 Sadr City bombings
- 24 June 2009 Baghdad bombing
- 2015 Baghdad market truck bomb
