= Damage to Baghdad during the Iraq War =

Overview article

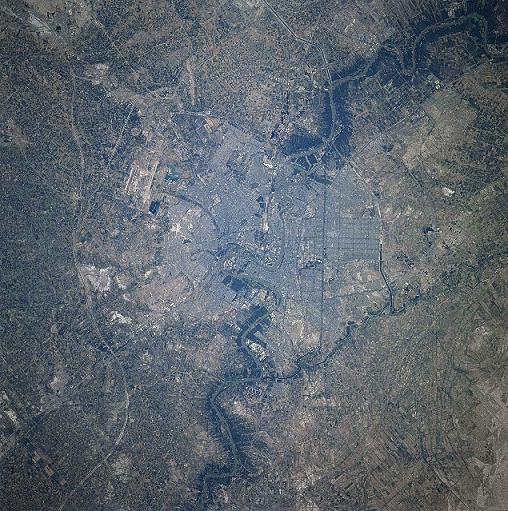
The population of Baghdad is around 7 million people.

The Iraq War started with a US-led invasion on 20 March 2003, causing much damage to the capital city, Baghdad. The war and collateral damage continued for years.

In October 2003, a joint United Nations/World Bank team conducted an assessment of funding needs for reconstruction in Iraq during the period 2004-2007. A study conducted by the Iraqi Central Bureau of Statistics in cooperation with the United Nations, based on surveys conducted in 2004, reported that a third of Iraqis were living in poverty, in spite of the rich natural resources of the country.

== Buildings damaged ==
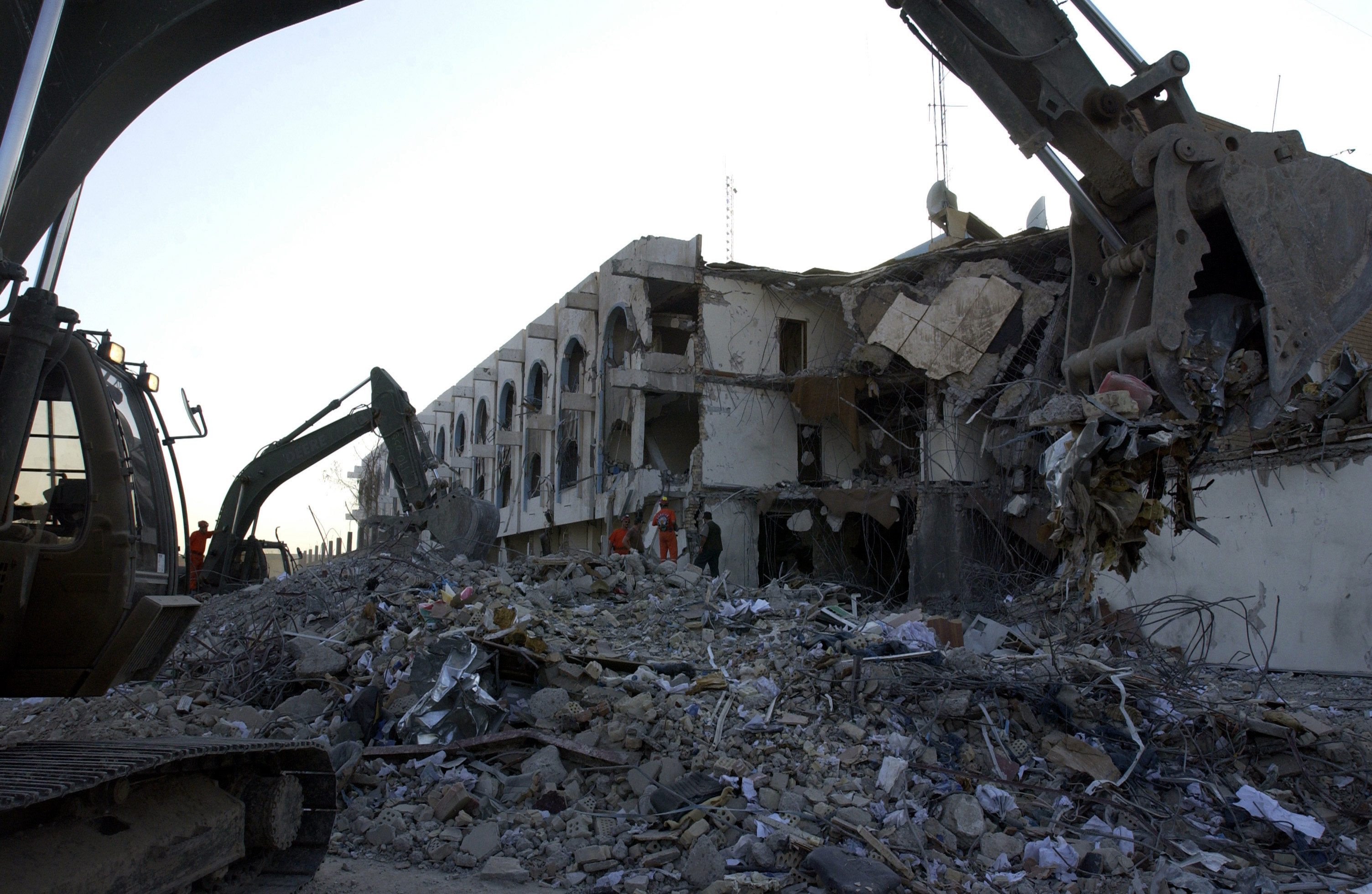
Canal Hotel bombing

- St. George's Anglican Church
- The 2003 Jordanian embassy bombing in Baghdad was the detonation of a truck bomb outside of the Jordanian embassy in Iraq on August 7, 2003.
- Destruction of the Canal Hotel, the location of the UN in Baghdad.
- According to GlobalSecurity.org, the Republican Palace and the Al Sijoud Palace were both reported damaged but unharmed.

=== Al-Askari mosque ===
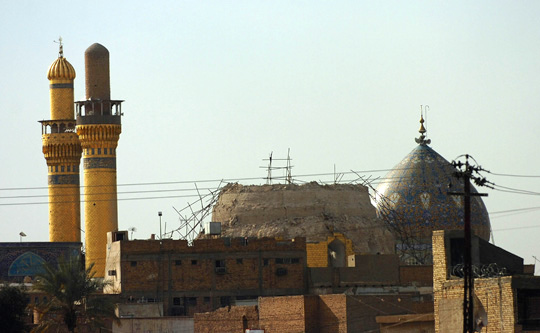
The Mosque in 2006 after the first bombing

The Al-Askari Mosque was bombed twice over two years.

On February 22, 2006, at 6:55 a.m. local time (0355 UTC) explosions occurred at the mosque, effectively destroying its golden dome and severely damaging the mosque. Several men belonging to Sunni insurgent groups affiliated with Al-Qaida, one wearing a military uniform, had earlier entered the mosque, tied up the guards there and set explosives, resulting in the blast. Two bombs were set off by five to seven men dressed as personnel of the Iraqi special forces who entered the shrine during the morning.

At around 8 a.m. on 13 June 2007, operatives belonging to al-Qaeda destroyed the two remaining 36 m (118 ft)-high golden minarets flanking the dome's ruins. No fatalities were reported. Iraqi police have reported hearing "two nearly simultaneous explosions coming from inside the mosque compound at around 8 a.m." A report from state run Iraqiya Television stated that "local officials said that two mortar rounds were fired at the two minarets."

As of April 2009, the golden dome and the minarets have been restored and the shrine reopened to visitors.

=== National Museum of Iraq ===
At the National Museum of Iraq, which had been a virtual repository of treasures from the ancient Mesopotamian cultures as well as early Islamic culture, many of the 170,000 irreplaceable artifacts were either stolen or broken (partially found safe and well later). On April 14, the Iraq National Library and National Archives were burned down, destroying thousands of manuscripts from civilizations dating back as far as 7,000 years.

== Electricity ==
During the Gulf War of 1991 aerial bombardment caused severe damage to the electric grid that operated the pumping stations and other facilities for potable water delivery and sewage treatment. The sanctions imposed by the UN at the conclusion of the Gulf War exacerbated these problems by banning the importation of spare parts for equipment and chemicals, such as chlorine, needed for disinfection.

The invasion of Iraq produced further degradation of Iraq's water supply, sewerage and electrical supply systems. Treatment plants, pumping stations and generating stations were stripped of their equipment, supplies and electrical wiring by looters. The once-capable cadre of engineers and operating technicians were scattered or left the country. Reconstruction efforts faced a nation with a severely degraded infrastructure.

In the hot summer of 2004, electricity was only available intermittently in most areas of the city. According to a member of Paul Bremer's staff, the problems with electricity were exacerbated by a surge in the use of air conditioners.

Baghdad continues to suffer regular rolling power outages.

== Baghdad Zoo ==
Within eight days following the 2003 invasion, only 35 of the 700 animals in the Baghdad Zoo survived. This was a result of theft of some animals for human food, and starvation of caged animals that had no food or water. Survivors included larger animals like lions, tigers, and bears. Not with standing the chaos brought by the invasion, South African Lawrence Anthony and some of the zoo keepers cared for the animals and fed the carnivores with donkeys they had bought locally.

== Transportation ==
Traffic problems in Baghdad have increased significantly since the 2003 invasion, credited to the formation of the Green Zone blocking roads, and new laws about automobile ownership. The Baghdad Metro completely stopped service until October 2008.

=== Bridges ===
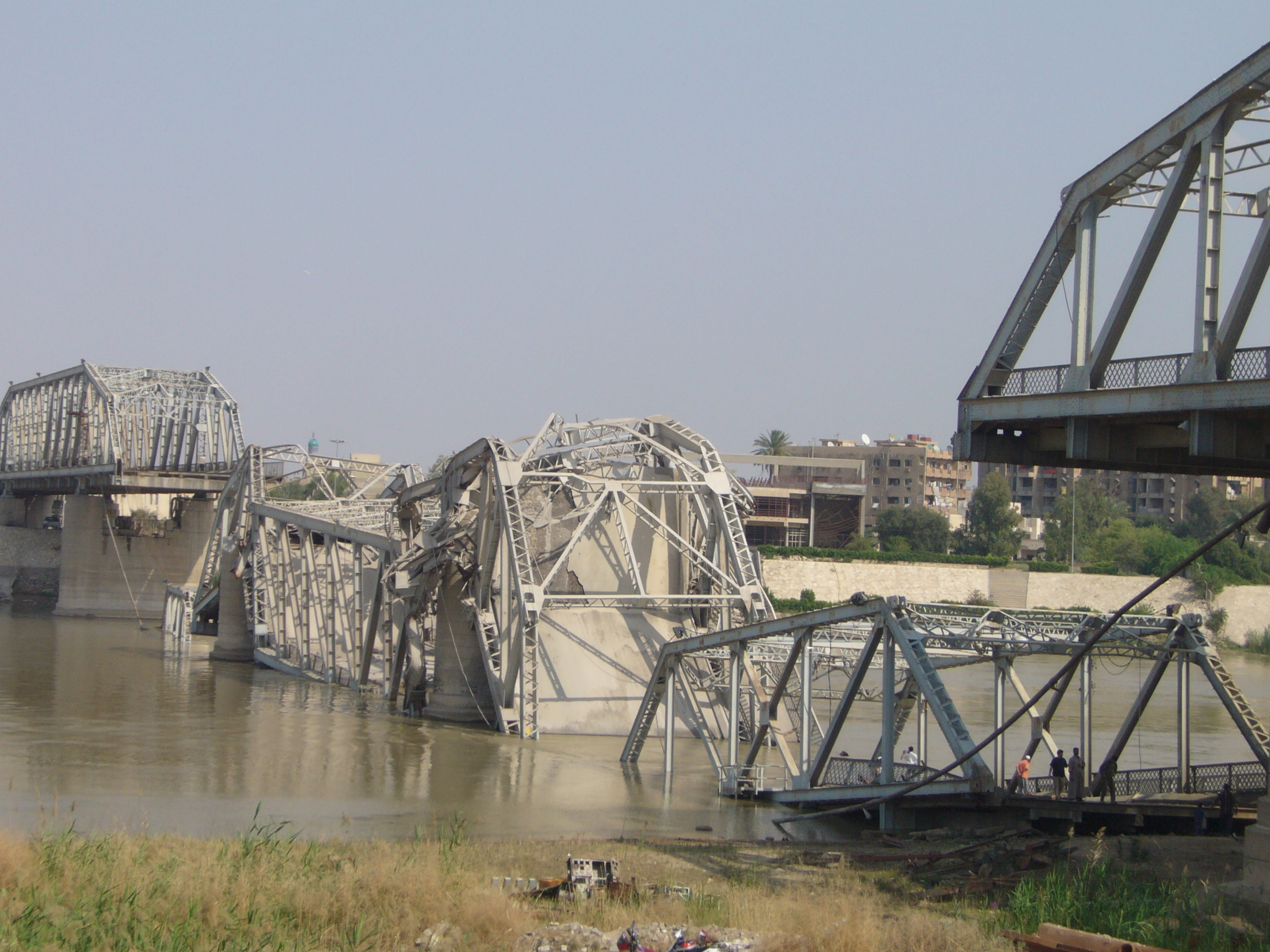
Al-Sarafiya bridge

Three of Baghdad's 13 bridges over the Tigris river have been targeted by large explosions. The Al-Sarafiya bridge was destroyed when an abandoned truck bomb exploded on April 12, 2007. At least 10 people were killed and 26 injured, though there were reports of 20 more trapped in cars that had gone off the bridge.

== Sanitation ==
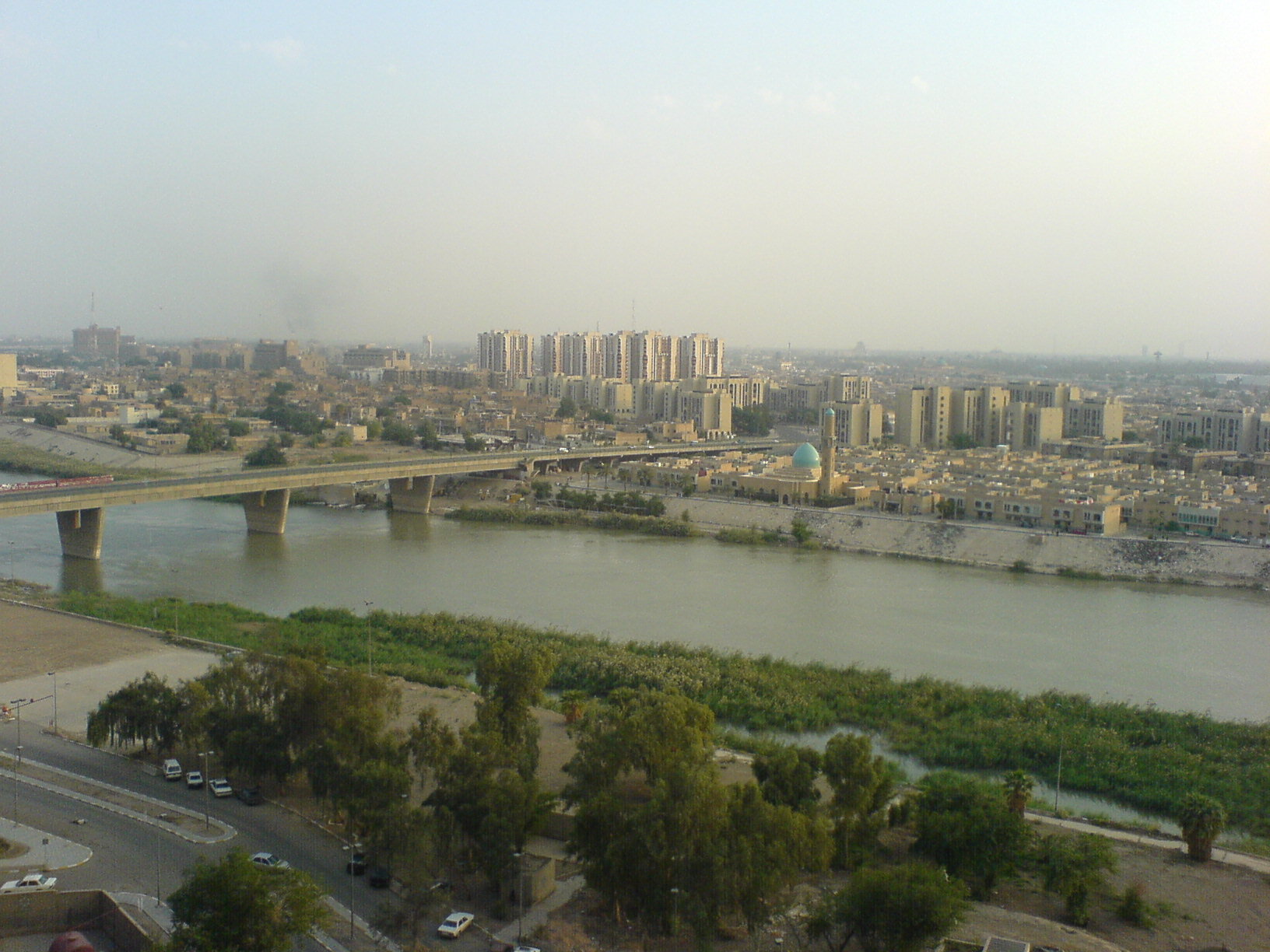
Haifa street, as seen from the Medical City Hospital across the Tigris River

Before the invasion there were 1200 working waste collection trucks. Most of the vehicles were destroyed or lost in the looting that seized the capital after the American invasion. The deputy mayor of Baghdad estimates the city needs 1,500 waste collection vehicles.

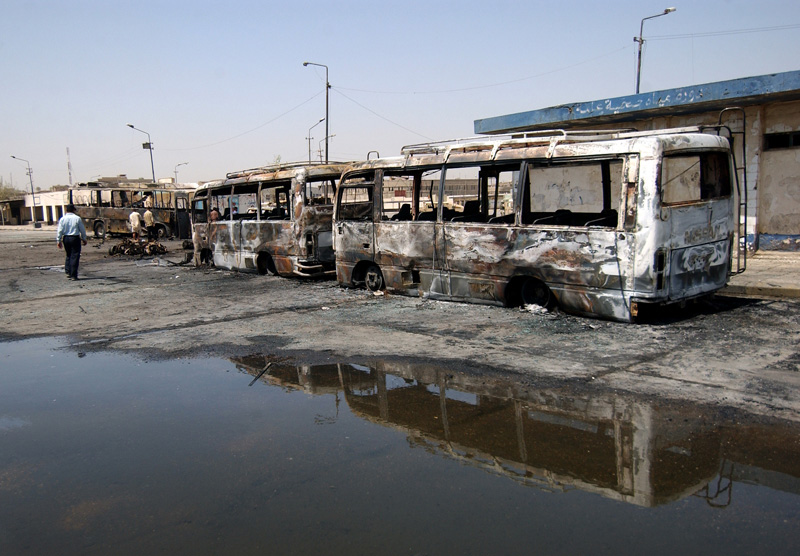
Buses bombed during the 17 August 2005 Baghdad bombings

== Looting ==
As the American forces secured control of the capital, Iraqi civilians immediately began looting the palaces, as well as government offices. At the important Yarmuk Hospital, not only all beds, but absolutely all its medical equipment, both large and small, was stolen. One other hospital managed to keep on functioning in a manner by organizing local civilians as armed guards.

Serious looting was described at National Museum of Iraq, the Iraqi Museum of Modern Art, the University of Baghdad, three five-star hotels: the Al Rasheed Hotel, the Al-Mansour and Babel Hotel, state-owned supermarkets, many embassies, and state-owned factories. Some 8,500 paintings and sculptures were looted. By 2010, only 1,500 of the most important works had been returned.

In addition to looting, a number of public monuments were also destroyed. Two important public sculptures were dismantled in the aftermath of the US invasion of 2003; one was the statue of Abu Jafar al-Mansur, the 8th-century Abbasid Caliph and founder of Baghdad and the other was the fountain known Nasb al-Maseera (or the March of the Ba'ath) formerly in Mathaf Square, both dismantled in October, 2005. The art historian, Nada Shabout, notes that the destruction of Iraqi art in the period after 2003, assumed both tangible and intangible forms. Not only were the artworks and art institutions looted or destroyed, but art production also suffered from the lack of availability of art materials and the loss of many intellectuals, including artists, who were forced into exile. The Ministry of Culture has estimated that more than 80 percent of all Iraqi artists are now living in exile. This contributed to an environment that failed to nurture artists, and saw young, upcoming artists operating in a void.

== Curfew ==
A nighttime curfew was imposed on the city immediately after the invasion. It was re-imposed for a whole weekend curfew during 2006, and for one night during the 2010 Iraq election.

== See also ==
- Invasion of Baghdad (2003)
- Infrastructure of Iraq
