= Terrorist incidents in Iraq in 2010 =

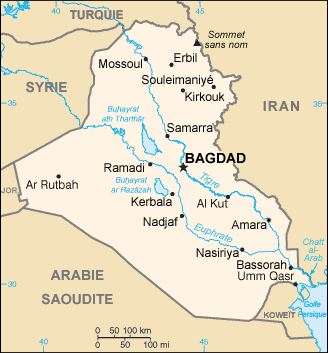
Map of Iraq

This is a list of terrorist incidents in Iraq during 2010. Major attacks include a 1 February attack killing 54 in Baghdad, and a 10 May attack killed 45 at a fabrics factory in Hillah.

== January ==
- January 7: A suicide bomber riding a bicycle targeted a local pro-government militia checkpoint in Balad, wounding eight.
- January 12: At least four suicide car bombers—and as many as 10—were apparently on their way to government buildings in the early morning when they were stopped by the police and arrested.
- January 13: A suicide truck bomber killed five policemen, a civilian and injured six in a suicide attack in Anbar Governorate in the town of Saqlawiyah.
- January 20: A suicide bomber blew up a sport utility vehicle in an Iraqi army headquarters in Mosul, wounding 45 people, including 18 soldiers and five policemen.
- January 22: A suicide bomber blew up a truck near an Iraqi army base, wounding an Iraqi army officer, in Baaj.
- January 25: 25 January 2010 Baghdad bombings. Triple suicide car bombings detonate near hotels popular with western business and media, killing 41 and injuring 110. The attacks coincide with the execution of Chemical Ali. Al-Qaeda claimed responsibility.
- January 26: A suicide car bomber kills 21 and injures 85 when he strikes at an Iraqi crime lab in the capital.
- January 27: A suicide bomber wearing a police uniform was shot as he tried to enter an Iraqi police station in the small town of Zummar, northwest of Mosul, the bombers suicide vest detonated after the shooting, wounding three Iraqi policeman and a U.S. soldier.

== February ==
- February 1: 1 February 2010 Baghdad bombing. A female suicide bomber detonated among a group of pilgrims making their journey to Karbala to mark Arbaeen as they walked through Baghdad, killing 54 and injuring 117.
- February 3: A suicide car bomber detonates in a crowd of pilgrims making their way to the Imam Hussein shrine in the city of Karbala, killing 10 and injuring 50.
- February 5: Two suicide car bombers leave 40 dead and 140 injured when they detonated on either side of a bridge across which pilgrims were making their way in and out of Karbala.
- February 16: A suicide car bomber leaves two policeman dead and injures 25 in Nabi Younus, in Mosul.
- February 18: A suicide car bomber kills 15 and injures 20 when he detonated at a checkpoint near government offices and courts.
- February 21: A suicide bomber trying to enter a mosque detonated an explosives-laden vest after being shot at by guards, killing one person and wounding six near Tikri.
- February 22: A suicide car bomber targeting a police headquarters killed three people, including a policeman, and wounded seven policemen in western Ramadi.

== March ==
- March 3: 2010 Baqubah bombings. Two suicide car bombers detonated near government buildings in the city of Baquba. Later a third suicide blast targeted the city's main hospital. The attacks killed 33 and injured 55.
- March 4: Two suicide bombers detonated in different areas of the capital killing 17 and injuring 35. It is known that polling stations were the target in both of these suicide attacks.
- March 15: A suicide car bomber detonated in Iraq's western province of Anbar in the city of Fallujah, killing 7 and injuring 13. The bombing came as counting still continues in Iraq's general election.
- March 25: A suicide bomber blew himself up in the house of Colonel Waleed Mohammed, who heads the Department of Fighting Terrorism in the town of Hit, killing three people and wounding three others. Mohammed was not there at the time of the attack.
- March 26: Two bomb explosions in the Iraqi town of Khalis, with at least one of the blasts being caused by a suicide bomber killed at least 40 people and injured more than 60 others.

== April ==
- April 3: A group of men stormed five houses in a village south of Baghdad, 25 victims were handcuffed, tortured, and shot in the head.
- April 4: Three suicide car bombers kill 41 when they hit in the centre of Iraq's capital city, Baghdad. One explosion reportedly occurred near to the Iranian embassy whereas the other two explosions were detonated in the west-central Mansour district within the city.
- April 12: A suicide car bomber targeted a police patrol in the northern Iraqi city of Mosul, killing a policeman and a civilian.
- April 23: April 2010 Baghdad bombings. In a wave of bombings across Baghdad at least one explosion was caused by a suicide bomber when 11 were killed near a Shiite mosque in al-Ameen district in southeastern Baghdad.
- April 28: Two suicide car bombers attacked police checkpoints in southern Baghdad, five people were killed and 10 wounded, including several police officers.

== May ==
- May 10: 10 May 2010 Iraq attacks. Two suicide car bombers drove into a fabrics factory as workers were ending their shift in the town of Hilla, as bystanders and emergency services rushed in to help the wounded, another suicide bomber detonated explosives causing a third explosion. The attacks left 45 dead and 140 wounded. Two suicide bombers, one wearing a vest laden with explosives and the other driving a car, killed at least 13 people and wounded 40 in a crowded Iraqi marketplace southeast of Baghdad. At least two Kurdish peshmerga fighters were killed and three wounded when a suicide bomber in a car drove into a checkpoint manned by U.S., Iraqi and Kurdish forces east of Mosul.
- May 11: A suicide car bomber exploded near a police checkpoint, wounding six people including two police officers, at the eastern entrance of Falluja.
- May 13: A suicide car bomber targeted a joint U.S.-Iraqi patrol on the main road from Baghdad to Mosul, injuring 2.
- May 14: A triple suicide bombing left at least 25 dead and as many as 108 wounded during a Tal Afar soccer game. At least one bomber drove a car to the stadium and detonated it near the entrance. The others blew up suicide vests.
- May 20: A suicide bomber attacked a police checkpoint, killing two policeman and a civilian and wounding another eight people including three policemen, in western Mosul.
- May 21: A pickup truck driven by a suicide bomber struck a commercial strip around sunset when the area was filled with shoppers in a predominantly Shiite town north of Baghdad, killing at least 21 people and wounding more than 50.

== June ==
- June 9: A suicide bomber on a motorcycle attacked a U.S military vehicle, killing 2 Iraqi civilians and injuring 5 others in the central Iraqi governorate of Diyala, which is located in central Iraq.
- June 11: A suicide car bomber struck a joint U.S.-Iraqi military patrol, killing 5 people including 2 U.S. soldiers and at least 3 Iraqis, as well as wounding 30 others within eastern Iraq.
- June 13: Unidentified gunmen, including five suicide bombers attacked the Iraqi central bank, killing 15 people and wounding another 50 others, in the centre of Baghdad.
- June 20: 20 June 2010 Baghdad bombings. Two suicide car bombers struck close to the Trade Bank of Iraq, killing at least 26 people and wounding more than 50 others in central Baghdad.
- June 21: A suicide bomber detonated his explosive-packed vest at a market, killing 8 people and wounding another 10 others within the northern Iraqi town of Shirqat.

== July ==
- July 4: A female suicide bomber struck the reception area of the heavily fortified governorate office, killing 4 people and wounding another 23 others in the city of Ramadi within Iraq's western Al Anbar Governorate.
- July 6–8: July 2010 Baghdad attacks. A suicide bomber struck a Shia pilgrimage killing 28 and wounding 62, in the Adhamiyah district of central Baghdad.
- July 9 A suicide car bomber drove his explosive-laden vehicle into an Iraqi army checkpoint, killing 6 people and wounding another 20 others in western Baghdad.
- July 18 A suicide bomber killed at least 43 people and injured more than 40 others after the attacker targeted government-backed Sunni militia members who were lining up to be paid within the neighbourhood of Radwaniya, in south-western Baghdad. Also, another attack by one of the "lions" of al-Qaida was at an Awakening Council headquarters in the western city of Qaim, a former insurgent stronghold near the Syrian border. The official death toll was three dead and six wounded. Iraqi officials said the bomber stormed the building and opened fire. The Sunni fighters returned fire and wounded the attacker, who blew himself up as the men gathered around him.
- July 20 A suicide car bomber struck a convoy of vehicles belonging to a private British construction company killing 4 people and wounding another 5 others within the Iraqi city of Mosul.
- July 21 A suicide car bomber detonated his booby-trapped car near to a casino in Iraq's eastern province of Diyala, killing 7 people and wounding 26 others.
- July 26 Two car bombs exploded near the holy Shi'ite city of Kerbala in southern Iraq on Monday, killing 19 mainly Shi'ite pilgrims and wounding 54, an Iraqi official said. In a separate incident in the capital Baghdad, a suicide bomber killed at least four people on Monday in an attack on the Saudi-owned Al Arabiya news channel, security officials said.

== August ==
- August 8: A suicide bomber killed at least 6 people and injured several others in Ramadi.
- August 17: 17 August 2010 Baghdad bombings
- August 25: 25 August 2010 Iraq bombings

== September ==
- September 5: As many as five suicide bombers, using a truck bomb and explosive belts attacked the Iraqi defence ministry complex, killing at least 12 people and injuring more than 36 others in the centre of Baghdad.
- September 19: 19 September 2010 Baghdad bombings

== October ==
- October 29: A suicide bomber has killed at least 25 people and injured dozens in a town north of Baghdad.
- October 31: 2010 Baghdad church massacre

== November ==
- November 2: At least 17 explosions occurred in the attacks, it is estimated that more than 113 people have been killed in the 2 November 2010 Baghdad bombings

== December ==
- December 12: A suicide car-bomber killed at least 13 people and injured more than 50 others, after the bomber attacked a checkpoint leading to government administrative buildings in Ramadi.
- December 13: A suicide bomber killed at least 4 people and injured 17 others in Baqubah.
- December 27: Two suicide bombers killed at least 17 people and injured more than 47 others, after the suicide attackers set off an explosive-laden vehicle, as well as a suicide bombers vest in an attack near a government compound in Ramadi.
- December 29: Two suicide bombers attacked a police compound in the northern Iraqi city of Mosul. The twin suicide attacks killed at least 4 police officers, after the two bombers breached the complex and detonated their explosives in the room of Lieutenant Colonel Shamil Ahmed Oglaq, who was among the dead and had apparently headed the battalion. The police building was known to have collapsed, as a result of these attacks and it is known that several police officers were unaccounted for, after the bombings. Security and rescue crews later scoured through the wreckage of the collapsed building looking for survivors of these suicide attacks.

== See also ==
- List of terrorist incidents in 2010
- List of bombings during the Iraq War
  - Terrorist incidents in Iraq in 2003
  - Terrorist incidents in Iraq in 2004
  - Terrorist incidents in Iraq in 2005
  - Terrorist incidents in Iraq in 2006
  - List of terrorist incidents in Iraq in 2007
  - Terrorist incidents in Iraq in 2008
  - Terrorist incidents in Iraq in 2009
