= 2015 Baghdad bombings =

2015 Baghdad bombings may mean

- February 2015 Baghdad bombings
- 2015 Baghdad market truck bombing
- October 2015 or November 2015 events listed at Terrorist incidents in Iraq in 2015
