= 27 May 2013 Baghdad bombings =

Terrorist incident in Iraq

- Part of Iraqi insurgency (post-U.S. withdrawal)
- Baghdad (Iraq)
- Date: 27 May 2013 (UTC+03:00)
- Target: Shia civilians
- Attack type: Car bombings, roadside bombings
- Weapons: Car bombs; IEDs
- Deaths: 71
- Injuries: 224

On 27 May 2013, a series of coordinated attacks occurred in Baghdad, the capital of Iraq, killing 71 people and injuring more than 200 others.

== Background ==
From a peak of 3,000 deaths per month in 2006–07, violence in Iraq decreased steadily for several years before beginning to rise again in 2012. In December 2012, Sunnis began to protest perceived mistreatment by the Shia-led government. The protests had been largely peaceful, but insurgents, emboldened by the war in neighboring Syria, stepped up attacks in the initial months of 2013. The number of attacks rose sharply after the Iraqi army raided a protest camp in Hawija on 23 April 2013. Overall, 712 people were killed in April according to UN figures, making it the nation's deadliest month in five years.

Post-Hawija targets have included both Sunni and Shia mosques, as well as security forces and tribal leaders. According to Mahmoud al-Sumaidaie, the deputy head of Iraq's Sunni Endowment, at least 29 Sunni mosques were attacked between mid-April and mid-May, resulting in the deaths of at least 65 worshippers. In contrast, only two Shiite places of worship were attacked during the same period, with a single person being killed. During the whole of 2012, a total of 10 Sunni mosques were attacked, signifying a recent increase in the sectarian nature of the insurgency.

The Baghdad bombings occurred in the aftermath of Iraq's deadliest week in almost 5 years, as a series of deadly bombings and shootings across the country killed at least 449 people and left 732 others injured between 15 May and 21 May.

== Attacks ==
Almost all of the bombings in the capital took place at marketplaces or in crowded shopping areas of Shi'ite districts. These included a car bomb in Sadr City's Habibiya neighborhood that started with a driver faking a car accident and then running away from the scene. As onlookers gathered, the explosives were detonated, killing 13 people and injuring 35 others. Blasts in Sabi al-Boor and Umm al-Maalif left 14 dead and 60 injured, while 6 were killed and 14 wounded in a blast on Sa'adoon Street. Bombings took place at two markets in Shaab and Jesr Diyala as well, where 10 were killed and 43 others injured. Similar attacks occurred in Bayaa, Hurriya, Kadhimiya, Jadida, Baladiyat and Sadriya - a total of 21 civilians lost their lives, while 72 others were wounded. Among the locations bombed was a Shia mosque in the Jadida district. Seven other fatalities were reported from Baghdad in various shootings and smaller attacks.

=== Outside Baghdad ===
Although the majority of insurgent activity was focused on Baghdad, several attacks took place in the central and northern parts of the country as well. A car bombing killed 3 and injured 9 others in Madain, just south of the capital, while shootings in Mosul killed a policeman and injured two others and a civilian. Three blasts on a farm in Shirqat killed two Sahwa militiamen and wounded three others. A police captain was critically injured after being shot outside his home in Iskandariya. Roadside blasts in Fallujah injured two soldiers, two civilians, as well as a police officer. Unidentified gunmen killed a teacher in Khalis, a Sahwa official in Kirkuk, and a government employee carrying his co-workers' salaries in Hit. A roadside bomb killed a police colonel in Qayara, while two other blasts in Abu Saida and Zab injured two civilians and a Sahwa member.

== Reactions ==
=== Domestic ===
Kareem Alewi, a member of the Iraqi Parliament representing the National Iraqi Alliance attributed the security deterioration to "foreign agendas aimed at dividing Iraq" and accused them of supporting al-Qaeda in Iraq and remnants of the former Baath Party. Former Parliament Speaker Mahmoud al-Mashhadani warned of a return to all-out sectarian violence, saying that politicians must "neglect the foreign plots and promote the national interests". "The current stage is the most difficult in the history of establishing the Iraqi State", he added. Mahdi Haji, a member of the Kurdistan Alliance, blamed the recent increase in attacks on "some regional and neighboring countries".

=== International ===
- United Nations – A statement by Martin Kobler, the UN Special Representative for Iraq, condemned the violence and urged Iraqi leaders to do "everything possible" to protect civilians. "It is the politicians' responsibility to act immediately and to engage in dialogue to resolve the political impasse and not let terrorists benefit from their political differences. We will continue to remind the leaders of Iraq that the country will slide into a dangerous unknown if they do not take immediate action.", the statement read.
- United States – The U.S. Embassy in Baghdad released a statement, "severely" denouncing the attacks and offering support to the victims and their families.

== See also ==
- List of terrorist incidents, January–June 2013
- 2012–2013 Iraqi protests
