= Camp Marlboro =

Former American military camp in Iraq

Camp Marlboro
- Sadr City, Baghdad Governorate in Iraq

Site information
- Owner: Ministry of Defence
- Operator: United States Army; United States Marine Corps

Location
- Shown within Iraq
- Coordinates: 33°18′54″N 43°52′59″E

Site history
- Built: 2003
- In use: 2003-2009
- Battles/wars: Operation Iraqi Freedom

Camp Marlboro was a U.S. Military Camp in Sadr City, Baghdad. It was built to facilitate military and peacekeeping operations in the densely populated Shia ghetto.

Camp Marlboro was named as such because it was located on the premises of a cigarette factory, run by one of Saddam Hussein's cousins until the US forces occupied the compound. Marlboro is an American cigarette brand.
