= Jisr Diyala =

Coordinates: 33.22°N 44.54°E

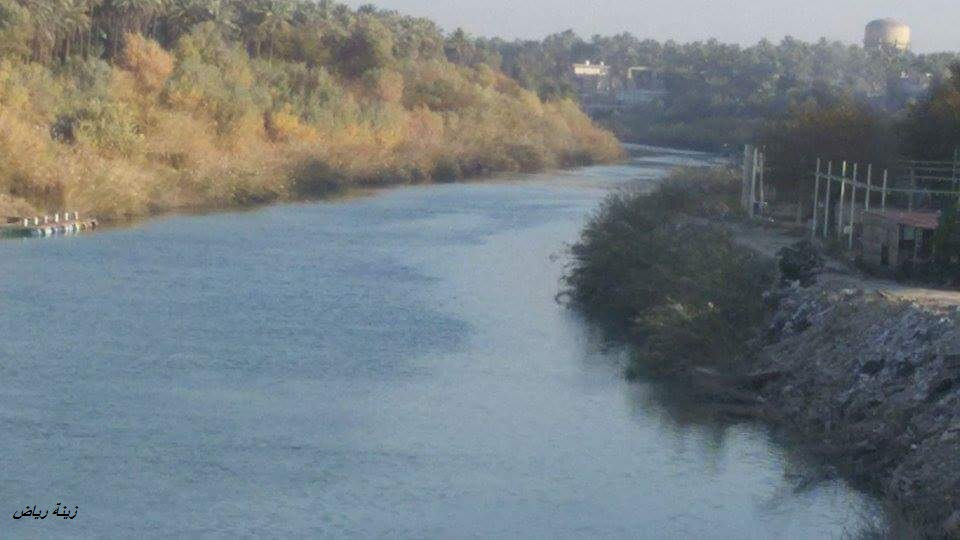

Jisr Diyala (Arabic: جسر ديالى)is a southeastern neighborhood of Karrada District, Baghdad, Iraq.
