= 21 September 2013 Iraq attacks =

Terrorist incident in Iraq

21 September 2013 Baghdad attack
- Part of Iraqi insurgency (post-U.S. withdrawal)
- Location: central and northern Iraq (centered on Baghdad)
- Date: 21 September 2013
- Target: Shia civilians, Iraqi security forces (Iraqi Army and Iraqi Police), Sahwa militias
- Attack type: Car bombings, suicide bombings, roadside bombings, shootings
- Weapons: Car bombs; IEDs; Automatic weapons
- Deaths: 115
- Injuries: 255

On 21 September 2013, a series of car and suicide bombings struck the central and northern regions of Iraq, with the largest attack targeting a funeral in Sadr City, a predominantly Shi'ite neighborhood of Baghdad. The attacks left at least 115 dead and more than 200 others injured.

== Background ==
From a peak of 3,000 deaths per month in 2006–07, violence in Iraq decreased steadily for several years before beginning to rise again in 2012. In December 2012, Sunnis began to protest perceived mistreatment by the Shia-led government. The protests had been largely peaceful, but insurgents, emboldened by the war in neighboring Syria, stepped up attacks in the initial months of 2013. The number of attacks rose sharply after the Iraqi army raided a protest camp in Hawija on 23 April 2013. Overall, 712 people were killed in April according to UN figures, making it the nation's deadliest month in five years. Conditions continued to deteriorate in May when UNAMI reported at least 1,045 Iraqis were killed and another 2,397 wounded in acts of terrorism and acts of violence, making it the deadliest month in the country since April 2008. Similar death tolls were recorded in July and August, as 2013 was on track to be the deadliest year for the country since 2008.

== Attacks ==
The attack in Sadr City took place shortly before sunset, just as dinner was being served at one of the tents set up for the funeral of a member of the al-Fartousi tribe. At least two suicide bombers took part in the assault - one driving almost into the tent before detonating his payload, while the other approached on foot moments later and detonated his vest nearby. Initial reports spoke of at least 60 dead, though the numbers rose to 78 killed and 202 injured by 22 September. Locals estimated around 500 people were attending the event, many of whom had to be taken to hospitals in civilian vehicles in the aftermath of the bombings. Firefighters had to reportedly leave the scene to refill their trucks with water, as they struggled to contain the immense blaze set off by the explosions. Less than two hours later, an additional bombing struck Baghdad's Ur neighborhood, adjacent to Sadr City, killing 9 civilians and injuring 14 others. Four people were also shot and killed at a liquor store in Adhamiyah.

Several other attacks were reported from around Iraq, most notably an assault on an elite police unit near Baiji, where at least 6 suicide bombers dressed in SWAT uniforms stormed the compound, killing 7 police officers and injuring 21 others. Insurgents attacked the homes of two prison guards in Mosul, killing both of them and injuring a woman. Two soldiers were killed and four others injured in a roadside bombing, while another was gunned down at a checkpoint. An improvised explosive device killed a civilian and injured 6 others near Abu Ghraib, while a similar attack killed a soldier and injured another near Fallujah. Unidentified gunmen killed a Sahwa member and injured four others in a shootout in Shirqat, while suspected smugglers shot dead an Iraqi Army captain and injured two soldiers near the Syrian border.

== See also ==
- List of terrorist incidents, January–June 2013
- 2012–2013 Iraqi protests
