= January 2017 Sadr City bombings =

Series of suicide car bombings

January 2017 Baghdad bombings
- Part of the War in Iraq (2013–2017)
- Baghdad (Iraq)
- Location: Baghdad, Iraq
- Date: 2 January 2017
- Target: Shiite civilians
- Attack type: car bombings, IEDs
- Weapon: Car bombs
- Deaths: At least 56
- Injuries: At least 120-122
- Perpetrator: Islamic State

On January 2, 2017, at least three suicide car bombings took place in a Shia Muslim eastern district of Sadr City, as well as behind the Kindi and Imam Ali hospitals, killing 56 people and injuring more than 120 others. Haider al-Abadi, Iraq's prime minister, had informed in a news conference that the suicide bombing, in Sadr City's busy market, was perpetrated by the suicide bomber detonating a vehicle with explosives. The bomber had pretended to hire day labourers in the market; once labourers gathered near the vehicle, the vehicle was detonated by him. The French President François Hollande was in the city during the attacks.

== Responsibility ==
The jihadist group Islamic State claimed the responsibility of attacks, with a targeted attack on a "gathering of Shia".
