= April 2010 Baghdad bombings =

2010 series of bomb attacks in Baghdad

- Part of Iraqi insurgency (2003–2011)
- Location: Baghdad, Iraq
- Date: 23–24 April 2010 (UTC+3)
- Target: Mostly Shias
- Attack type: coordinated bomb detonations
- Deaths: 85+
- Injuries: 145+
- Perpetrator: Islamic State of Iraq

The April 2010 Baghdad bombings were a series of bomb attacks in Baghdad, Iraq that killed at least 85 people over two days. Hundreds more were seriously wounded.

== The bombings ==
=== 23 April attacks ===
On 23 April, over a two-hour time span, a wave of coordinated bombings hit Shia Muslims leaving Friday prayers, Shiite neighbourhoods, and a market. The attacks consisted of five car bombs, which accounted for 58 deaths, and approximately 13 bombs in total. A car bomb outside the Abdel Hadi al-Chalabi mosque in Al-Hurriya killed five and wounded 14. Three bombs, including two car bombs, in the Sadr City district of Baghdad occurred near the headquarters of Shiite cleric Muqtada al-Sadr, where followers gather for morning prayers every Friday. The bombings killed at least 39 and wounded 56 others in Sadr City. A car bomb and a suicide bomber in the Al-Ameen district in east Baghdad killed 11 worshipers leaving a Shiite mosque after prayers and wounded 23 additional people. "Why do they always target us? We are peaceful people. We come to pray and then go on our way," remarked one angry survivor.

Five homemade bombs were also detonated in the predominantly Sunni Al Anbar Governorate killing seven and injuring 11. A police officer responding to the bombings was killed by a roadside bomb. A cluster of houses was damaged in the attack. According to NPR correspondent Quill Lawrence, the bombs were targeted at a police detective and a judge living in the area, both of whom survived. Late on 24 April, the official death toll from the Friday attacks stood at 72. Around 120 people were wounded.

=== Continued violence ===
On 24 April, 13 additional people were killed when three bombs were detonated in Western Baghdad. The three bombs, which were hidden in plastic bags, injured 25 additional people. The three bombs exploded simultaneously in a billiard hall located in a mixed Sunni-Shiite neighbourhood.

== Perpetrators and aftermath ==
Iraqi Prime minister Nouri al-Maliki and other Iraqi officials alleged that the Islamic State of Iraq organization carried out the bombing attacks. The attacks were widely seen as retribution for the killings of two top Islamic State of Iraq officials Abu Omar al-Baghdadi and Abu Hamza al-Muhajir the previous Sunday. Security spokesperson Qassim al-Moussawi stated that "targeting prayers in areas with a [Shiite] majority is a revenge for the losses suffered by the Islamic State of Iraq." Iraqi political analyst Hameed Fadhel agreed, saying, "These are acts of revenge that are intended to send a message to the Iraqi government and the world that the Islamic State of Iraq's existence will not be affected by the killing of specific leaders." No one has officially claimed responsibility. The government expects "such terrorist acts to continue."

After the attacks, Muqtada al-Sadr offered to "Iraqi security forces to fight insurgents", sparking fear that he might be considering a revival of his Mahdi Army militia. Al-Sadr's aides claimed that he had no such plans. He urged his followers to remain calm and not provoke the United States, but added that he was prepared to have "hundreds of believers" join the Iraqi army and police forces. "The government might ask the help of individual citizens, not from armed groups," presidential aid Ali al-Adeeb responded.

On Friday and Saturday, citizens of the Sadr City enclave of Baghdad took to the streets for at least six separate funeral processions. Many of the victims were carried to the holy city of Najaf, 100 miles (160 kilometers) to the south. Some of the mourners supported the idea of reviving the Mahdi Army. "They can provide security. The government cannot," remarked one citizen.

== See also ==
- List of terrorist incidents, 2010
- Terrorist incidents in Iraq in 2010
