= Timeline of Zakho =

The following is a timeline of the history of the city of Zakho, Iraq.

== Prior to 20th century ==
- 641 – Zakho Great Mosque built after Islamic army had occupied Zakho
- 1041 – Hasseniya Khabur was destroyed by Turkman forces called Ghuzz Forces
- 1507 – Safavid captured Zakho
- 1515 – The Ottoman Empire captured Zakho .
- 1544 – Zakho became Sanjak
- 1844 – English traveler William Francis Ainsworth visits Zakho
- 1864 – Zakho was becoming District followed Mosul Eyalet
- 1892 – In Zakho a pogrom started and 7 Jews were murdered

== 20th century ==
- 1918
  - November 30: Ottoman forces withdraw from Zakho and the British assume control over the city.
- 1919 – The British Governor of Zakho, Captain Persson assassinated By Hasso Dino .
- 1922 – The first elementary school was opening.
- 1923
  - The King of Iraq Faisal visited Zakho city.
  - The first Iron bridge built
- Sindhi tribe agha (chief) ambushed and killed six policemen, near Sharanish in April 1925.
- 1934 – Al Saadun Bridge opened
- 1946 – Khabur hotel became first hotel was opening in Zakho
- 1970 – The first Television brought to the city
- 1987
  - Qumri Ismael Haji was executed
  - Zakho FC (football club) formed.
- 1991
  - March 13: People in the Zakho attacked the Iraqi military bases and stormed government buildings and took control of the town and inflicted heavy damage on government forces
  - April 1: The Iraqi forces had recapture the city
  - April 21: The Coalition forces had dismissed The Iraqi forces from Zakho The Peshmerga entered Zakho.
- 1995 – A car bomb exploded in Zakho on February 27

== 21st century ==
- 2011 – Many stores selling alcohol and massage parlours crashed by many angry Kurds
- 2013 – The University of Zakho opened
- 2015 – The Zakho International Stadium opened on June 3
- 2018 – Zakho tunnel opened on September 25
- 2021 -The City becoming independent administration belong Duhok Governorate
- 2024 – Museum of Zakho founded
