= 2010 Al-Kazimiyya Mosque bombings =

2010 terrorist incident in Baghdad, Iraq

Al-Kazimiyya Mosque bombings
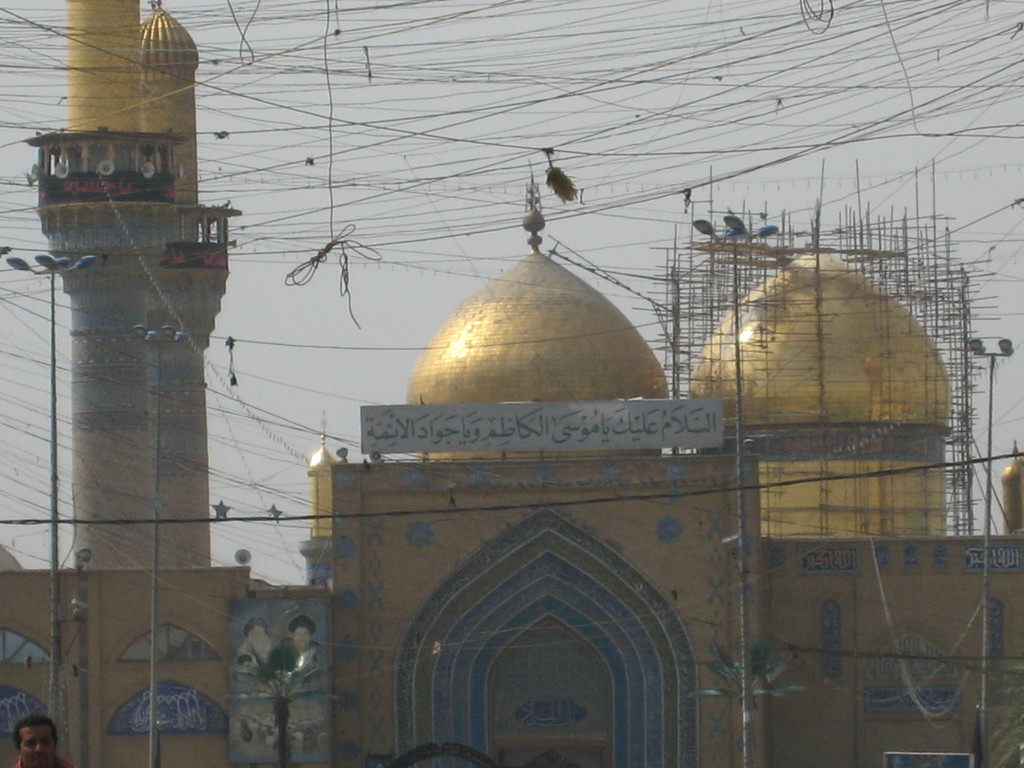
- Mausoleum of Musa Kadhim
- Location: Kadhimiya, Baghdad, Iraq
- Date: 6-8 July 2010; 19:45 – 20:00 (UTC+3)
- Target: Shia pilgrims
- Attack type: Suicide bomb, bombing
- Deaths: 70+
- Injuries: 400+
- Perpetrator: Unknown

In early July 2010, a series of bombing attacks in Baghdad, Iraq killed at least 70 people while injuring 400 during a Shia pilgrimage to Al-Kazimiyya Mosque, the mausoleum of Musa al-Kadhim. The bombings targeted those on the annual pilgrimage and took place from 6 to 8 July. The pilgrimage has been attacked previously by Sunni extremists, and in 2005 was the site of a stampede that killed up to 1,000 people.

== Background ==
The pilgrimage to Al-Kazimiyya Mosque is of significance to Shia Muslims, as he was the seventh of 12 revered imams in Shia Islam. The pilgrimage was due to reach its climax on the night of the bombing and into the early hours of the next day.

In 2005, 1,000 people were killed in a crowd crush on the way to this mausoleum during the same pilgrimage. In 2009, Shia pilgrims were killed on the way to the shrine (including many Iranians) in a suicide attack.

The attacks also followed US Vice President Joe Biden's visit to meet senior Iraqi officials to urge them to form a government.

== Attacks ==
During the Shia pilgrimage festivities to the mosque that lasted three days from 6 – 8 July various attacks in the city took place. The most deadly attack occurred in the hours before tens of thousands of Shia's came into Baghdad amid heavy security for the pilgrimage. Hundreds of tents were erected to feed people as they came into town. Another bomb struck in the central Bab al-Muazam neighbourhood while a third exploded in the southeastern Mashtal district.

The deadliest attack occurred in Adhamiyah district on 7 July, killing 28 people and leaving a further 136 wounded. Eleven more people in the area were killed in bomb attacks on the same day. Further attacks were carried out whilst the pilgrimage ended on 8 July that killed 11 and injured more than 77 more. Some of the attacks were made with mortars and others with roadside bombs.

Heavy security had been put in place prior to the attacks as bombings that target Shia pilgrims are common in Iraq. Military checkpoints were in place and all vehicular traffic had been banned on several of Baghdad's main bridges. Major General Qassim Atta of the Baghdad police said special safety measures, including road closures, were employed to protect the pilgrims. "We continue to organise transport for pilgrims and air surveillance for their benefit. The movement of motorcycles, bicycles and carts is banned throughout the city until further notice." However, a lone suicide bomber struck the crowd en route to the shrine.

== Responsibility ==
Though no one claimed responsibility, a correspondent for the Christian Science Monitor said that in the past "these very large Shia pilgrimages have been targeted by Sunni militants interested in increasing sectarian tension[s]." The attacks were seen as a "clear indication of the determination of anti-government fighters to exploit Iraq's political vacuum and destabilise the country as US troops prepare to leave."

== Reaction ==
(Lebanon) Opposition party Hezbollah condemned the attacks for its targeting of pilgrims visiting the Holy Shrine and considered its perpetrators "heartless and inhumane criminals who seek to sabotage Iraq, targeting its security and stability." A statement it released, emphasized that "such acts are in service of the US occupation and its devilish schemes as Iraq had turned into a scene of genocides since the US soldiers set foot in the country, targeting those believers, the holy shrines and the mosques." It also expressed "sincere feelings of sympathy and support to the families of the victims, calling upon the sons of Iraq to uncover the murderers and sanctioning them."

== See also ==
- Terrorist incidents in Iraq in 2010
- 2016 Al-Kazimiyya Mosque bombing
