= 1 February 2008 Baghdad bombings =

Suicide bombings in Baghdad, Iraq

Coordinates: 33.3333°N 44.3833°E

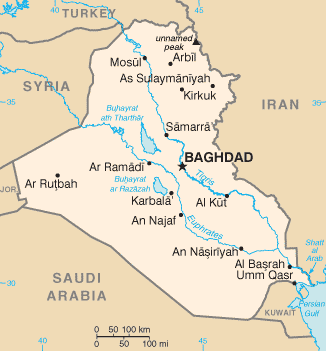
- Location of Baghdad in Iraq
- Location: Baghdad, Iraq
- Date: 1 February 2008 (UTC+3)
- Attack type: Suicide bombs
- Deaths: 98
- Injuries: 208
- Perpetrator: Unknown: legal proceedings have not yet taken place.

The 1 February 2008 Baghdad bombings occurred on 1 February 2008, when two suicide bombings occurred in Baghdad, the capital of Iraq. The blasts killed 98 people and injured over 200 others.

== Details ==
The two blasts were shortly before the call to Friday prayers when many Iraqis were shopping or meeting with friends.

Initial reports were that both women had Down syndrome, based on the analysis of their intact heads. But later reports were less clear on the issue, saying that the women had depression and schizophrenia and it was unknown whether they had a condition that made them unable to understand what they were doing.

The acting director of the al-Rashad psychiatric hospital, Dr. Sahi Aboub, was arrested in connection with the attack on 10 February. It has been reported that Dr Aboub is a Shia Muslim and that the al Rashad hospital is run by the Shia Mehdi Army. However, the attacks occurred in primarily Shia areas of Baghdad.

== Reactions ==
- Iraq: Prime Minister Nouri Maliki said the use of disabled people underlined the "terrorists' moral degradation".
