= November 2010 Baghdad bombings =

Terrorist incident in Iraq

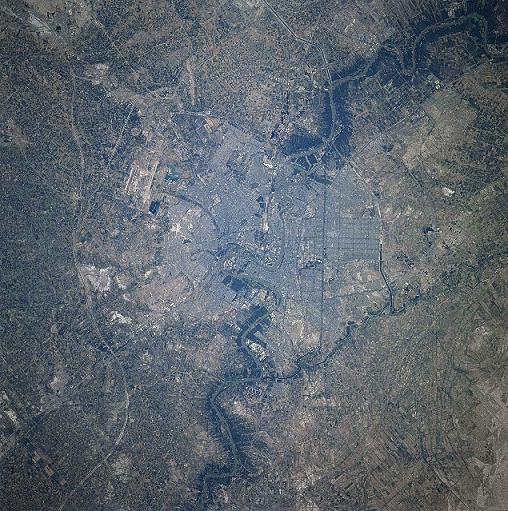
- A satellite image of Baghdad, Iraq, where the attacks occurred
- Location: Baghdad, Iraq
- Date: 2 November 2010 (UTC+3)
- Weapons: Car bombs roadside bombs
- Deaths: 113+
- Injuries: 300+

The November 2010 Baghdad bombings were a series of attacks in Baghdad, Iraq that killed more than 110 people.

At least 17 explosions occurred in the attacks, 48 hours after the 2010 Baghdad church massacre where 58 people were killed by a suicide bomber in a Baghdad church. While the Islamic State of Iraq did not officially claim responsibility for the attack, a U.S. military spokesperson alleged that ISI-affiliated fighters might have carried out the attacks. The majority of the explosions occurred in populated areas, including near restaurants. At least 15 were killed in one attack, in Sadr City.
