= 1 July 2006 Sadr City bombing =

Suicide bombing in Sadr City, Baghdad, Iraq

- Part of the Iraqi civil War
- Location: Sadr City, Baghdad, Iraq
- Date: 1 July 2006
- Target: Market
- Attack type: Suicide car bombing
- Deaths: 77
- Injuries: 96
- Perpetrator: Sunni people
- Motive: Anti-Shi'ism

On 1 July 2006, at around 10:00 A.M, a suicide car bombing at a crowded market in Sadr City, a Shi'ite district of Baghdad, killed at least 77 people and wounded 96.

The car was a truck loaded with fruit, under which a "mix of explosives and artillery shells, with ball bearings nearly the size of marbles and scrap metal added for shrapnel [was hidden]" the Washington Post reports "The truck, with a suicide driver at the wheel, blew up on a street crowded on both sides with shops and market stalls, leaving a crater the size of a wading pool in the pavement." The bomb was powerful enough to propel some bodies onto the roofs of houses. The bomb destroyed 22 stalls and sent up a grey plume of smoke. Fire shot out of the windows of some cars (14 cars were destroyed).

A group calling themselves The Supporters of the Sunni People claimed responsibility for the attack. The group accused Shi'ite's of "killing Sunnis and throwing their bodies in the streets after badly torturing them. It added that Sunni women under detention were being raped by Shiites." CBS news reports.

The attack was the deadliest to come to Iraq since the death of Abu Musab al-Zarqawi. After the attack, and while firefighters were putting out the fire, an angry mob gathered around the wreckage and shouted allegiance to radical Shiite cleric Moktada al-Sadr, while denouncing the Sunni people and the new prime minister Nuri al-Maliki and his government.

== See also ==
- Sadr City terrorist attacks
- Siege of Sadr City
