= 28 September 2008 Baghdad bombings =

Terrorist incident in Iraq

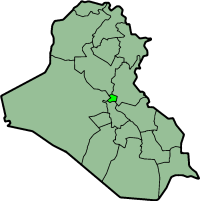
- Location: Baghdad, Iraq
- Date: 28 September 2008 (UTC+3)
- Target: Civilian population
- Attack type: Bombing; Car bombing
- Deaths: 32
- Injuries: 100
- Perpetrator: unknown

The 28 September 2008 Baghdad bombings were a series of bombings that occurred on 28 September 2008, killing a total of 32 and injuring 100. The first car bomb of the day was planted in a minibus and was detonated late in the afternoon in the Shurta neighbourhood of south Baghdad, killing 12. Shortly after, a car bomb detonated in a parking lot of a market in the nearby Hay al-Amil district killing one. Later in the evening, a third car bomb and a roadside bomb was detonated in the Karrada district killing 19 people dead and injuring 70.

== See also ==
- List of terrorist incidents in 2008
