= 19 September 2010 Baghdad bombings =

2010 series of bomb attacks in Baghdad

19 September Baghdad bombings
- Part of Iraqi insurgency (2003–2011)
- Location: Baghdad, Iraq
- Date: 19 September 2010 (UTC+3)
- Attack type: coordinated bomb detonations, car bombs
- Deaths: 31+
- Injuries: 100+
- Perpetrator: Islamic State of Iraq

The 19 September 2010 Baghdad bombings were a series of bomb attacks in Baghdad, Iraq that killed at least 31 people, in two neighbourhoods of the capital. Over a hundred more were wounded. On 24 September the Islamic State of Iraq claimed responsibility for the attack.

== Background ==
Iraqis blamed the political deadlock in their country for the attacks as Iraqi authorities are struggling to form a unity government since March 2010 elections which rendered no single bloc to form a majority win and hence, depending upon each other, for forming a coalition government.

Further the attacks in recent days also coincided with the USA's decision to downsize its troops in Iraq and handing over the security to Iraqi forces.

== Attacks ==
On 19 September 2010 two car bombs exploded in the Iraqi capital almost simultaneously at around 10:10 am. The first (and most powerful) car bomb exploded in the residential Mansour district killing 10 people. The attack was in front of the local sales office of Asiacell (an Iraqi mobile phone company), although it is not clear if this was the specific target.

Minutes later, a second attack occurred, in the predominantly Shia neighborhood of Al Kadhimiyah. Apparently aimed at an office of the Iraqi Federal Police and the National Security Ministry in Adan Square, it killed approximately 21 people and injured 71. A witness described the attack; "It was a minibus – the driver stopped and told people nearby that he was going to go see a doctor, a few minutes later, it exploded."

== Perpetrators and aftermath ==
On 24 September, the Islamic State of Iraq organization claimed responsibility for the attack.

== See also ==
- List of terrorist incidents, 2010
- Terrorist incidents in Iraq in 2010
