= December 2016 Baghdad market bombings =

Civilian attack in Baghdad

December 2016 Baghdad bombings
- Part of War in Iraq (2013–2017)
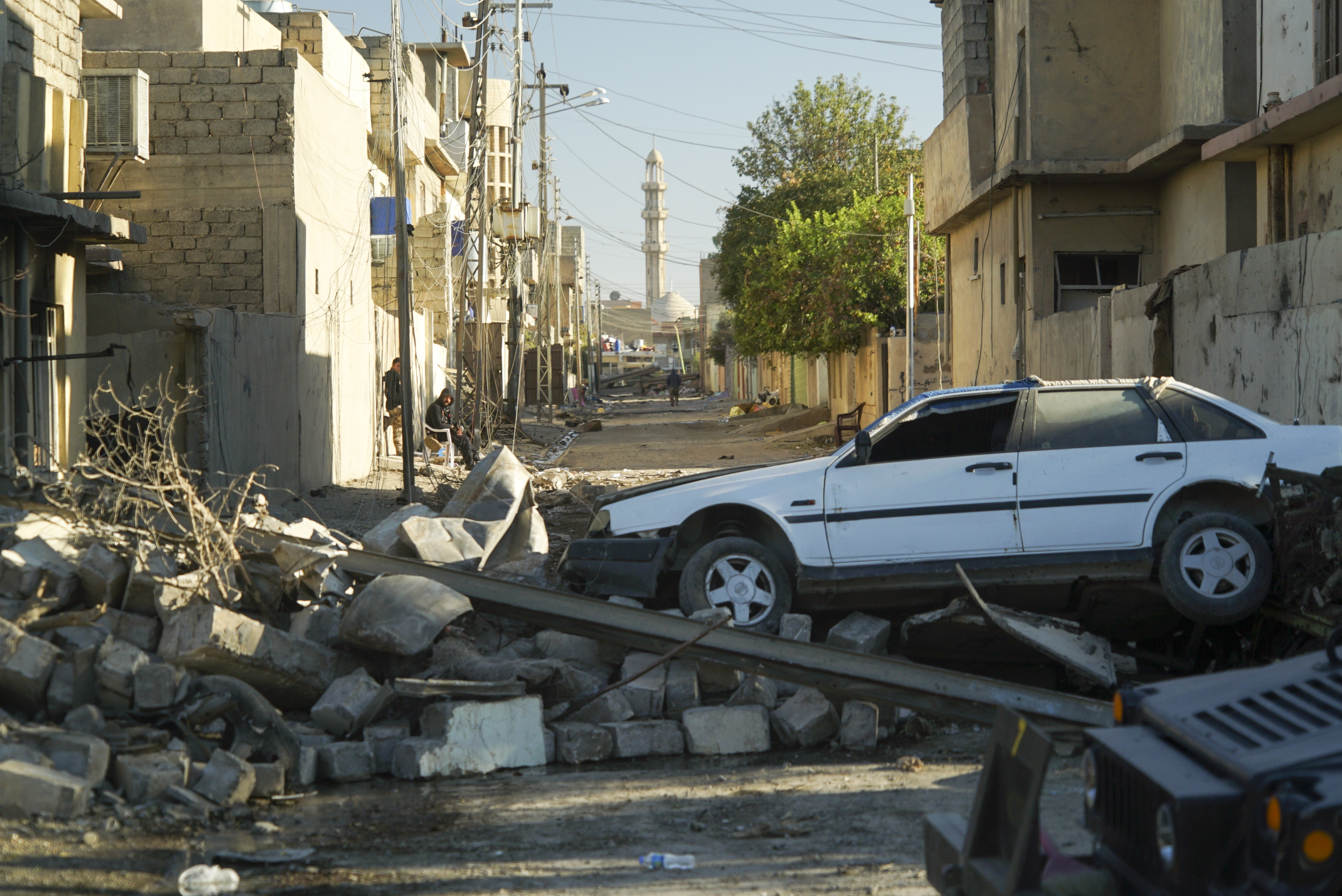
- Location: al-Sinak market, Baghdad, Iraq
- Date: 31 December 2016
- Weapon: Bomb
- Deaths: 28
- Injuries: 50
- Perpetrator: Islamic State
- No. of participants: 2 attackers

The December 2016 Baghdad bombings was a pair of bomb blasts targeting a market during a rush hour in central Baghdad. The attack kills at least 28 people and another 50 were injured.
