= 1 February 2010 Baghdad bombing =

Suicide bombing in Baghdad, Iraq

- Part of Iraqi insurgency (2003–2011)
- Location: Baghdad, Iraq
- Date: 1 February 2010; 11:45 am – 12:00 pm (UTC+3)
- Target: Multiple
- Attack type: Suicide Bomber
- Deaths: approx 54
- Injuries: 117
- Perpetrator: Unknown
- Motive: Anti-Shi'ism

The 1 February 2010 Baghdad Bombings was a suicide bombing in Baghdad, Iraq, which killed at least 54 people, and wounded another 100. The attack was aimed at a group of Shia pilgrims walking to a religious festival.

== Attack ==
The female suicide bomber blew herself up at a rest stop along the route the pilgrims were taking to a Shia religious festival held in Karbala. The rest stop had a security search area, which is where the bomber detonated her explosives belt. There was a similar attack on the same pilgrims last year, which killed 40.

== See also ==
- List of terrorist incidents, 2010
- Terrorist incidents in Iraq in 2010
