= 25 January 2010 Baghdad bombings =

Terrorist attack in Baghdad, Iraq

- Part of Iraqi insurgency (2003–2011)
- Location: Baghdad, Iraq
- Date: 25 January 2010 (UTC+3)
- Attack type: Suicide car bombs
- Deaths: 41
- Perpetrator: Unknown

On 25 January 2010, three suicide car bombs exploded in quick succession in central Baghdad, Iraq. At least 41 people were killed. On 27 January 2010 the Islamic State of Iraq claimed responsibility for the attack.

== Attack ==
The first explosion occurred around at 3:30 pm (1230 GMT). The second blast came just minutes later in the centre of the capital near the Green Zone, with the third close by soon after.

== Perpetrators ==
While the attack had not been claimed yet, an Iraqi government advisor immediately alleged that the Islamic State of Iraq organization carried out the attacks.

== See also ==
- Terrorist incidents in Iraq in 2010
