= April 2013 Baghdad café bombing =

2013 suicide bombing of a cafe in Baghdad, Iraq during the post-U.S. insurgency

18 April 2013 Baghdad bombing
- Part of Iraqi insurgency (post-U.S. withdrawal)
- Location: Baghdad, Iraq
- Date: 18 April 2013
- Attack type: Suicide bombing
- Deaths: 27
- Injuries: 65

On 18 April 2013, a suicide bombing in a Baghdad cafe killed 27 people and injured another 65. A suicide bomber set off his explosive belt inside the cafe on the evening of 18 April 2013. The establishment was packed with young people enjoying water pipes and playing pool.

== Background ==
Violence in Iraq has decreased since its peak in 2006–07, but attacks remain common. Deaths rose in 2012 for the first time in three years.

In the months leading up to the 20 April provincial elections, the first since the withdrawal of US forces in 2011, tensions were high in Iraq as Sunni groups claimed they were being marginalized by Prime Minister Nouri al-Maliki's Shiite dominated government. A number of large scale attacks linked to the Sunni umbrella group Islamic State of Iraq were carried out in early 2013 in an attempt to destabilize the country ahead of the elections. At least fourteen election candidates have been murdered, while Anbar and Nineveh provinces have postponed elections because of security concerns. Four other provinces are not scheduled to hold elections on 20 April.

== See also ==
- List of terrorist incidents, January–June 2013
