= 18 February 2007 Baghdad bombings =

2007 series of bomb attacks in Baghdad

- Part of Iraqi civil war
- Location: Baghdad, Iraq
- Date: 18 February 2007 (UTC+3)
- Attack type: Car bombings
- Deaths: 63
- Injuries: 131
- Perpetrator: Unknown
- Motive: Anti-Shi'ism

On 18 February 2007, three car bombs exploded in predominantly Shia areas of Baghdad, killing at least 63 people and injuring 131. The bombings occurred despite a huge military offense, led by US and Iraqi troops, starting days before.

Two blasts occurred at a market on the Mohammad Al Qasim Highway in the New Baghdad area, which killed 60 people. Two more were killed in another attack in Sadr City, where another car bomb rammed a police checkpoint.

One of the killed, Ehab Karim, was a midfield footballer for Al Sinaa.
