= February 2007 Shorja market bombings =

2007 terrorist attack via car bombings in Shorja market, Baghdad, Iraq

Shorja market bombings
- Part of the Iraq War, Iraqi insurgency, and the Iraqi civil war
- Location: Baghdad, Iraq
- Date: 12 February 2007 (UTC+3)
- Attack type: Car bombing, fire
- Deaths: 76+
- Injuries: 155-180
- Perpetrator: Unknown

Two car bombs exploded in Baghdad, Iraq at 12:20 on 12 February 2007 in the Shorja market district, killing 76 people, and injuring 155–180.

The explosions set market stalls, shops, and an adjoining 7-storey building on fire, causing further casualties, and local fire-crews struggled for hours to extinguish the flames. The collapse of a building was also reported. The injured were taken to the nearby Al-Kindi hospital, which struggled to cope with the influx, and more casualties are expected from injuries.

== Al-Askari anniversary ==
The bombings happened during 15 minutes of state endorsed silence, to mark the anniversary of the Al-Askari Mosque bombing in Samarra, which prompted heavy bloodshed. The Iraqi Prime Minister Nouri al-Maliki was participating in a televised ceremony remembering the victims of the attack, and was speaking when the blasts occurred, only two miles away. Al-Maliki had been calling for calm, unity and reconciliation, and had said that the Iraqi Security Forces were regaining control of Iraq's security situation.
