= 10 May 2010 Iraq attacks =

2010 terrorist incident in Iraq

Coordinates: 33.3157°N 44.3922°E

- Part of Iraqi insurgency (2003–2011)
- Location: Baghdad, Mosul, Basra, Fallujah, Iskandariyah, Al Tarmia, Suwayrah, Samarra. Iraq
- Date: 10 May 2010 (UTC+3)
- Target: various
- Attack type: coordinated bomb detonations, suicide car bombings, targeted killings, shootings
- Deaths: 114+
- Injuries: 350+
- Perpetrator: Islamic State of Iraq

The 10 May 2010 Iraq attacks were a series of bomb and shooting attacks that occurred in Iraq on 10 May 2010, killing over 114 people and injuring 350, the highest death toll for a single day in Iraq in 2010.

== Background ==
Following the inconclusive 2010 Iraqi elections, these attacks were believed to be an attempt to further destabilise Iraq. Major General Qassim al-Moussawi, an Iraqi Army spokesman, gave a statement on 10 May in which he said "Al-Qaeda is trying to ... use some gaps created by some political problems".

According to official statistics, violent deaths in Iraq decreased slightly in April 2010 compared with April 2009.

== Attacks ==
There were at least twenty attacks, of which the worst, by death toll, was a series of three or four suicide car bombs at the 'State Company for Textile Industries' in Al Hillah in central Iraq, approximately 100 km (62 mi) from the capital, Baghdad. The first two bombs were in quick succession at about 1:30 pm (10:30 UTC), followed minutes later by a third. A fourth car bomb targeted the crowd and emergency services at the scene, according to police Captain Ali al-Shimmari. The bombs killed a total of 45 people, leaving 140 wounded.

Fallujah, which had previously seen intense battles between insurgents and American troops was targeted with at least two deaths resulting from bomb blasts. There were also attacks in Iskandariya, Mosul, Samarra and Al Tarmia (Tarmiyah).

There were multiple shootings across the country, particularly at checkpoints in Baghdad. According to officials, as Baghdad's nightly curfew lifted at 05:00 local time, gunmen disguised as municipal street cleaners attacked 10 police and army checkpoints across the city, killing as many as 9 soldiers and officers, and wounding 24.

== Responsibility ==
While no organization claimed responsibility, Iraqi officials alleged that Islamic State of Iraq (ISI) group carried out the attacks in retaliation against the killing of ISI's two high-ranking leaders of U.S. and Iraqi forces.

== See also ==
- Terrorist incidents in Iraq in 2010
