= 14 September 2005 Baghdad bombings =

Terrorist attacks in Baghdad, Iraq

14 September 2005 Baghdad bombing
- Location: Baghdad, Iraq
- Date: 14 September 2005
- Target: Labourers who gathered in Oruba Square
- Attack type: Suicide bombings
- Deaths: 182
- Injuries: 679
- Perpetrator: Unknown

The 14 September 2005 Baghdad bombings were a series of more than a dozen terrorist attacks in the Iraqi capital of Baghdad.

The most deadly bombing occurred when a suicide car bomber detonated his vehicle in a crowd of construction workers who had gathered in Baghdad's Oruba Square looking for jobs. The attack, which occurred in the mainly Shia district of Kadhimiya, killed 112 people, and injured 160.
