= 6 April 2010 Baghdad bombings =

4 April 2010 Baghdad bombing
- Location: Baghdad, Iraq
- Date: 4 April 2010 (UTC+3)
- Target: Government Buildings
- Attack type: Homemade bombs
- Deaths: 41
- Injuries: 200+

The 4 April 2010 Baghdad bombings where a series of bomb explosions in Baghdad, Iraq.The attack killed 41 people and at least 200 were injured.
