= 6 March 2008 Baghdad bombing =

Suicide bombing in Iraq

- Location: Baghdad, Iraq
- Date: 6 March 2008 (UTC+3)
- Target: Karrada
- Attack type: Suicide bombing
- Deaths: 68
- Injuries: 120
- Perpetrator: Unknown

The 6 March 2008 Baghdad bombing was a suicide bombing attack on a shopping district in Baghdad, the capital city of Iraq, on 6 March 2008, killing 68 people and wounding 120.

The attack happened in the neighbourhood of Karrada. The attack consisted of a double bombing. A roadside bomb exploded at first and then, when the first responders and other civilians were rushing to help the wounded, a suicide bomber blew himself up.
