= 22 January 2007 Baghdad bombings =

2007 terrorist attack in Baghdad, Iraq

- Part of the Iraq War, Iraqi insurgency, and the Iraqi civil war
- Location: Bab Al-Sharqi market of Baghdad, Iraq
- Date: 22 January 2007; 12:00 – 17:00 (UTC+3)
- Target: Shiite marketplace
- Attack type: Car bombs
- Deaths: 88
- Injuries: 160
- Perpetrator: Unknown: legal proceedings have not yet taken place.
- Motive: Anti-Shi'ism

The 22 January 2007 Baghdad bombings was a terrorist attack that occurred when two powerful car bombs ripped through the Bab Al-Sharqi market in central Baghdad, killing at least 88 people and wounding 160 others in one of the bloodiest days since the US invasion of Iraq. The attack occurred two days after the start of the 10-day Shiite mourning period leading up to Ashura. It also coincided with the arrival of 3,200 additional troops into Baghdad as part of the Iraq War troop surge of 2007.

== Overview ==
The attack took place on a Monday, after a weekend in which 27 American soldiers were killed in Iraq. The blasts at the Baghdad market were aimed at a Shiite area and seemed timed to inflict maximum damage, occurring at noon local time, which is one of the busiest times of the day

Police officials said the blasts were so large that each of the cars carried more than 200 pounds of explosives. The explosions could be heard from the eastern banks of the nearby Tigris River. Fires from the explosion engulfed at least a dozen cars, creating clouds of smoke large enough that they drifted over the Green Zone, about half a mile away.

The New York Times reported that:

The blasts left so many bodies that they had to be loaded on wooden carts stacked one upon the other, according to witnesses. Others were simply blown to pieces.

— Marc Santora, New York Times

Similar attacks by Sunni Arab insurgents targeting Shia civilians often provoked reprisals. According to the Iraq Body Count project, this period of intense sectarian violence resulted in over 150,000 documented civilian deaths.

== Gun battles ==
The bombing was followed by prolonged gun battles. The fighting could be heard across the city, although officials did not release any casualty figures from the ensuing skirmishes. At the site of the car bombings, Iraqi Army troops spotted a man on a nearby rooftop shortly after the attack, filming the carnage. According to an Iraqi Army official, the man was killed by gunfire while attempting to escape over the rooftops. The official said the man was an Egyptian and was filming the attack to use as propaganda for the Sunni insurgents.

== Condemnation ==
Prime Minister Nuri Kamal al-Maliki, whose government has proven incapable of ending the bloodshed, condemned the attack. He blamed the car bombs on followers of Saddam Hussein. At least 70 people were killed in a double bombing outside a Baghdad University during the previous week, an attack Maliki also blamed on Saddam's supporters. A UN envoy said Iraq was sliding "into the abyss of sectarianism" and urged Iraqi political and religious leaders to halt the violence.

== Other attacks ==
In addition to the market attacks, at least 15 people were killed and another 39 wounded in coordinated bomb and mortar attacks in the Shiite town of Khalis. Later that same day, a Sunni mosque in the Dura section of Baghdad was blown up; there were no reports of casualties and residents said the attack was likely retribution for the bombing of a Shiite mosque in the same neighborhood during the previous week. Police confirmed that they had found 29 unidentified bodies with gunshot wounds; altogether, more than 130 people were killed in and around the capital.
