= 17 June 2008 Baghdad bombing =

Terrorist incident in Baghdad, Iraq

- Location: Baghdad, Iraq
- Date: 17 June 2008 (UTC+3)
- Target: Bus stop
- Attack type: Suicide car bomb
- Deaths: 51
- Injuries: 75
- Perpetrator: Unknown
- Motive: Anti-Shi'a sentiment

The 17 June 2008 Baghdad bombing was a suicide car bomb attack on a bus stop in northern Baghdad, the capital city of Iraq, on 17 June 2008, killing 51 people and wounding 75.

The attack happened in the Shia neighbourhood of Hurriya. The explosion struck during the early evening rush hour, when the bus stop was crowded with waiting passengers.
