= 1 August 2007 Baghdad bombings =

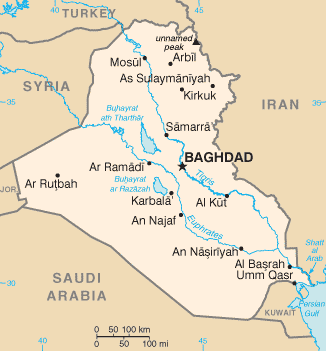
- Location of Baghdad in Iraq
- Location: Baghdad, Iraq
- Date: 1 August 2007 (UTC+3)
- Attack type: Suicide bomb and car bombs
- Deaths: 74
- Injuries: 60+
- Perpetrator: Unknown: legal proceedings have not yet taken place.

The 1 August 2007 Baghdad bombings occurred on 1 August 2007, when several suicide bombings and car bombings occurred in Baghdad, the capital of Iraq. In one of the attacks, a fuel tanker packed with explosives exploded near a petrol station in the suburb of Mansour. The bombing set fire to ten vehicles at the petrol station killing 50 and wounding 60 in and around the petrol station.
