= February 2015 Baghdad bombings =

Terrorist incident in Iraq

- Part of Iraqi Civil War (2014–2017)
- Location: Baghdad, Iraq
- Date: 7 & 9 February 2015
- Attack type: Triple bombings
- Deaths: 58+
- Injuries: 70+
- Perpetrator: Islamic State

On 7 February 2015 three separate bombings in Baghdad, the capital city of Iraq, killed at least 36 people. At least 70 people were also injured. The bombings occurred shortly before a curfew that had been in place for a decade was lifted, but Saad Maan, a spokesman for the Iraqi Interior Ministry, said that he did not think the bombings were linked to the curfew. On 9 February two more bombings occurred in Baghdad, one in Kadhimiya and the other in a northern Baghdad suburb. These bombings killed a total of at least 15 people.

The first attack was perpetrated by a suicide bomber in a restaurant in New Baghdad. The second attack occurred in the Shorja market district, and involved two bombs placed about 25 meters apart from each other. The third attack occurred at the Abu Cheer market. The bombings on 7 February killed at least 22, 10, and two people, respectively. In addition to those dead, the attack in New Baghdad also wounded 45 people, the attack in Shorja wounded 26 people, and the attack in Abu Cheer wounded 15 people.

== Perpetrators ==
Maan has accused the Islamic State of perpetrating the attacks to reassert their presence in Baghdad. IS later claimed responsibility for the 7 February attack in New Baghdad, and said this bomber was targeting Shiites. No group or individual has yet claimed responsibility for the 9 February attacks.
