= 17 August 2005 Baghdad bombings =

Terrorist attack in Baghdad, Iraq

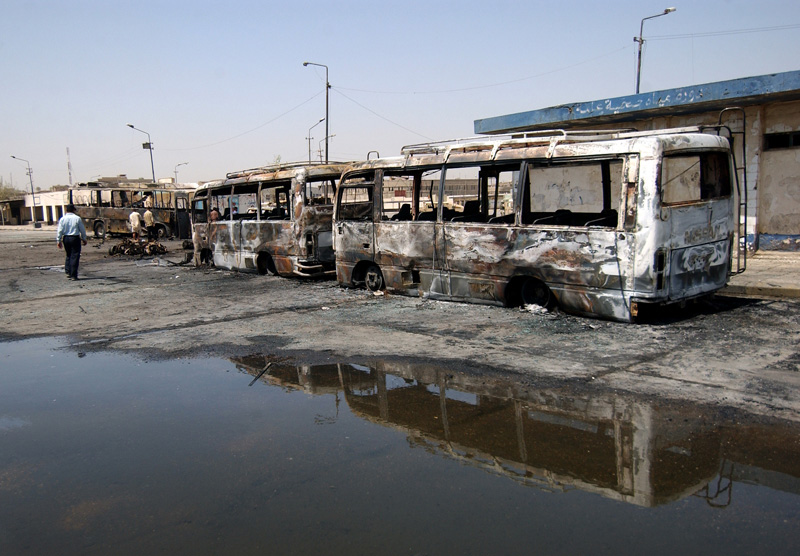
- Bombed buses at the Nahda bus station
- Location: Baghdad, Iraq
- Date: 17 August 2005
- Target: bus station, road to hospital
- Attack type: car bombs
- Deaths: 43
- Injuries: 76
- Perpetrator: no one claimed responsibility

The 17 August 2005 Baghdad bombings was a terrorist attack that occurred when three powerful car bombs ripped through civilian targets in central Baghdad, killing 43 people and injuring 76.
