= April 2009 Baghdad–Miqdadiyah suicide attacks =

2009 Suicide attacks in Iraq

Coordinates: 33.978611°N 44.936944°E

Baghdad–Miqdadiyah suicide attacks
- Location: Baghdad and Miqdadiyah, Iraq
- Date: 23 April 2009
- Attack type: 2 suicide attacks
- Weapon: Explosives
- Deaths: 76
- Injuries: At least 103
- Perpetrator: unidentified
- Motive: Anti-Shi'a sentiment

On 23 April 2009, two separate suicide attacks occurred in Baghdad and Miqdadiyah. At least eighty people are known to have died in the attacks, including several Iranian pilgrims. The Los Angeles Times puts the death toll at seventy-nine. Most of the forty-eight people killed in Muqdadiyah, near Baqubah, Diyala Province, are believed to have been Iranian nationals. According to the BBC, if the death tolls are confirmed, these attacks were the most lethal of 2009.

== Attacks ==
=== Baghdad ===
At least eighty people were killed in Baghdad when an explosive belt was detonated by a female attacker. Police were said to be helping in administering aid to homeless people in the Basil square in the Alwehda district at the time. Over fifty people were wounded in the attack. At least six National Police officers were killed, with one police officer describing how he carried off the bodies of three of his colleagues whose uniforms were "drenched in blood". Five children and two Red Crescent volunteers were also among the dead. Thirty-five-year-old Issam Salim, a survivor injured by shrapnel as he waited for a bus, said: "I turned around as I fell to the ground and saw a big fire break out with black smoke. Women and children are crying from pain beside me in the hospital. Some of them suffered burns." The scene in the aftermath of the attack was said to have been marked by chaos.

=== Muqdadiyah ===
At least forty-eight people, all but two of whom were Iranian pilgrims, were killed and approximately sixty-three others were injured when the New Khanaqin restaurant in Muqdadiyah was targeted at 12:45 pm The Iranians had paused for lunch as they embarked on a pilgrimage to a Shi'a Muslim religious site in Baghdad. Sixty-four-year-old pilgrim, Kadhumi Sadiq, said: "While the waiter was serving us food a powerful explosion took place and the restaurant turned black. I suffered burns on my head, chest and hands". The restaurant was left demolished in the aftermath of the attack.

Abdulnasir al-Muntasirbillah, the recently sworn-in mayor of the region, visited the local hospital, describing the scene as "catastrophic" and the attack as dirty and cowardly.

== Perpetrators ==
Baghdad's security spokesman, Maj-Gen Qassim Moussawi, said: "It is a suicide bomber. Obviously that has the fingerprints of al-Qaeda”. Also other Iraqi officials, and the Los Angeles Times suggested, without citing sources, alleged that the Islamic State of Iraq organization was involved in the bombings.

== Reaction ==
The Washington Post called 23 April "the bloodiest day in Iraq this year". Reuters said it "appeared to be Iraq's bloodiest day in over a year" and surpassed an 11 December 2008 attack in Kirkuk which killed fifty.

These attacks were followed a day later by two more suicide attacks which killed sixty people at the al-Kādhimiya Mosque in Baghdad.
