= 2010 Trade Bank of Iraq bombings =

Iraq suicide bombing

20 June 2010 Baghdad bombings were carried out by two suicide bombers outside Trade Bank of Iraq. At least 26 people were killed and 50 people were injured when two suicide bombers drove their cars and exploded them simultaneously in front of the bank's headquarters in central Baghdad. The two cars, each carrying 80 kilograms (180 lb) of ammonium nitrate exploded after striking the blast walls protecting the bank.
