= 26 July 2007 Baghdad market bombing =

2007 bomb and rocket attack in Baghdad

- Location: Baghdad, Iraq
- Date: 26 July 2007 (UTC+3)
- Target: Karrada
- Attack type: Car bomb, rockets
- Deaths: 92
- Injuries: 127
- Perpetrator: Unknown: legal proceedings have not yet taken place.

The 26 July 2007 Baghdad market bombing were a truck bomb and rocket attack on a market in the Karada district of Baghdad, the capital city of Iraq, on 26 July 2007, killing almost 100 people.

It was first reported that 25 people were only killed and 100 wounded. However, less than a week later the names of 92 dead and 127 wounded were posted on a list taped to a shuttered storefront; it was compiled by the rescue workers. Many Iraqis saw the discrepancy as an attempt by the Iraqi government to cover up the number of Iraqis being killed in the capital.
