= Jordanian embassy bombing in Baghdad =

2003 unclaimed attack in Iraq

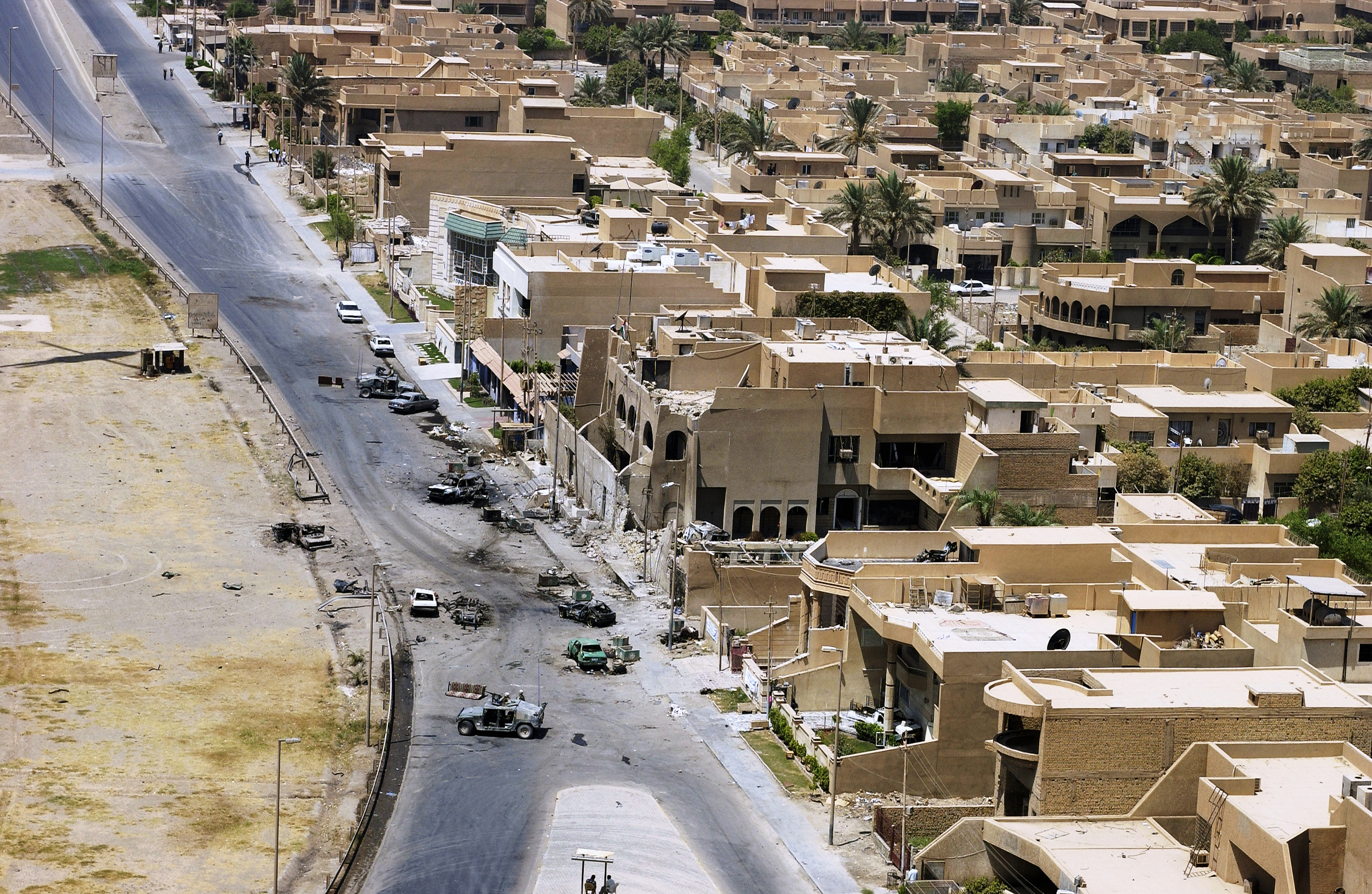
- Jordanian embassy after the bombings
- Location: Baghdad, Iraq
- Date: August 7, 2003
- Target: Embassy of Jordan
- Attack type: Bus bombing
- Weapon: Improvised explosive device
- Deaths: 17
- Injuries: 40
- Perpetrator: Unknown (Jama'at al-Tawhid wal-Jihad suspected)

On 7 August 2003, a bomb exploded outside the Jordanian embassy in Baghdad, Iraq, killing 17 people and injuring dozens more. The bomb, concealed in a minibus, exploded outside the walls of the embassy compound at around 11:00am local time. The force of the explosion sent a car onto a nearby rooftop and killed several people nearby including women and children. Six police officers guarding the embassy were among the dead. Immediately after the blast, the embassy compound was swarmed by a mob of Iraqis who ransacked the building, chanting anti-Jordanian slogans and burning portraits of King Abdullah II. According to Lieutenant-General Ricardo Sanchez, the commander of US forces in Iraq, the attack was the worst in Iraq since the capture of Baghdad that previous March.

== Perpetrators ==
No group claimed the attack. A team of agents from the Federal Bureau of Investigation was dispatched to Iraq shortly after to investigate the bombing. Abu Musab al-Zarqawi, a Jordanian insurgent leader, was the prime suspect in the investigation. The attack came a week after Jordan granted asylum to the daughters of Saddam Hussein, a move which angered numerous Iraqis.
