= 17 August 2010 Baghdad bombings =

Two attacks in Baghdad, Iraq

- Part of Iraqi insurgency (2003–2011)
- Location: Baghdad, Iraq
- Date: 17 August 2010; 07:30 and 21:30 – (UTC+3)
- Target: Army recruits & Shias
- Attack type: Suicide bombing and Truck bombing
- Deaths: 69+
- Injuries: 169
- Perpetrator: Islamic State of Iraq

The 17 August 2010 Baghdad bombings were two attacks in Baghdad, Iraq. The first attack in the morning was when a suicide bomber detonated his explosives outside the Iraqi Army division headquarters on potential recruits to the army, some of whom had queued for hours prior to the bombings, that killed over 60 and wounded more than 100. The second attack took place in the evening when a fuel truck exploded in a Shia neighbourhood, killing 8 and wounding 44.

Islamic State of Iraq claimed the first of the two attacks.

== Background ==
The bombing came amid uncertainty over the future government in Iraq following the 2010 Iraqi parliamentary election. One day before the attack former Iraqi Interim Prime Minister Iyad Allawi pulled out of coalition talks with Prime Minister Nuri al-Maliki following claims that al-Maliki was pushing for a sectarian division of government.

Security forces have been targets of attack in the months prior to this bombing. The United States began to reduce its troop strength in Iraq, from just under 60,000 at the time of this bombing, to about 50,000 by 31 August, which was scheduled to be the formal end of combat operations.

The bombing was the first major attack of the year's Ramadan, the most venerated month in the Islamic calendar.

== Bombings ==
=== First bombing ===
Unemployed people had queued for hours outside an Army recruiting centre when a suicide bomber approached and detonated his explosives. The recruiting location is near the Bab al-Muadhan (Great Gate) by the Tigris River and the former Iraqi Ministry of Defense building in downtown Baghdad.

An interior ministry official said the majority of the victims were army recruits but there were also some soldiers who were protecting the recruitment centre among the casualties. The casualties among these soldiers were at least three dead and eight wounded, with the overall total killed at over 60.

=== Second bombing ===
On the same day another attack occurred at 21:30 in the majority Shia neighbourhood of Hay Ur. A bomb attached to a fuel truck loaded with kerosene exploded, killing eight people and wounding 44 more.

== Perpetrators ==
Iraqi spokesman Gen. Al-Moussawi immediately blamed al-Qaeda in Iraq for the bombings.

Islamic State of Iraq, which includes al-Qaida in Iraq, within three days claimed the first of the two attacks, saying it targeted "a group of Shias and apostates who sold their faith for money and to be a tool in the war on Iraqi Sunnis", and boasting that its operative easily passed through checkpoints before detonating his explosives belt in a crowd of officers and recruits outside army headquarters.

== Reaction ==
- A White House spokesman said "There obviously are still people who want to derail the advances that the Iraqi people have made toward democracy. But they are firmly on track. And we're confident that we're moving toward the end of our combat mission. The fact that there is a lot of competition for who is going to be running that country is a good thing."

== See also ==
- List of terrorist incidents, 2010
