= 23 November 2006 Sadr City bombings =

Series of car bombs and mortar attacks in Iraq

Sadr City bombing
- Part of the Iraqi civil war
- Location: Sadr City neighborhood of Baghdad, Iraq
- Date: 23 November 2006; 15:10 – 15:55 (UTC+3)
- Target: Shia Sadr City Slum
- Attack type: Car bombs and mortar rounds.
- Deaths: At least 215
- Injuries: 140
- Perpetrator: Unknown

The 2006 Sadr City bombings were a series of car bombs and mortar attacks in Iraq that occurred on 23 November at 15:10 Baghdad time (12:10 Greenwich Mean Time) and ended at 15:55 (12:55 UTC). Six car bombs and two mortar rounds were used in the attack on the Shia slum in Sadr City.

== Casualties ==
The attacks killed at least 215 people and injured 100 others, making it one of the deadliest sectarian attacks since the beginning of the Iraq War in 2003. Following the attacks, the Iraqi government placed Baghdad under 24-hour curfew beginning at 20:00 Baghdad time (17:00 UTC), shut down Baghdad International Airport to commercial traffic, and closed the docks and airport in Basra, Iraq. The curfew was lifted on 27 November.

== Timing of the attacks ==
The attacks occurred while residents of Sadr City were commemorating the life of Mohammad Mohammad Sadeq al-Sadr. Al-Sadr was killed by the former Iraqi regime of Saddam Hussein in February 1999.

On 16 November 2006, an arrest warrant for Harith al-Dari, a prominent Sunni cleric, was issued in Baghdad. Moqtada al-Sadr, the son of Mohammad Mohammad Sadeq al-Sadr and a controversial figure in his own right, called out on Friday for al-Dari to issue fatwas prohibiting the killing of Shiites, membership in "al Qaeda or any other organization that has made (Shiites) their enemies," and expressing support for the restoration of the Imam Ali Shrine. When al-Dari has done this, Sadr says he will oppose the arrest warrant against him.

== Perpetrators ==
No organization has claimed responsibility for the attacks. Sadrist politician Ali al-Shemari alleged that the attack was orchestrated by insurgents affiliated with the Iraqi Ba'ath party.
