= Sadr City =

Sadr City مدينة الصدر (Madīnat aṣ-Ṣadr)
- District of Baghdad
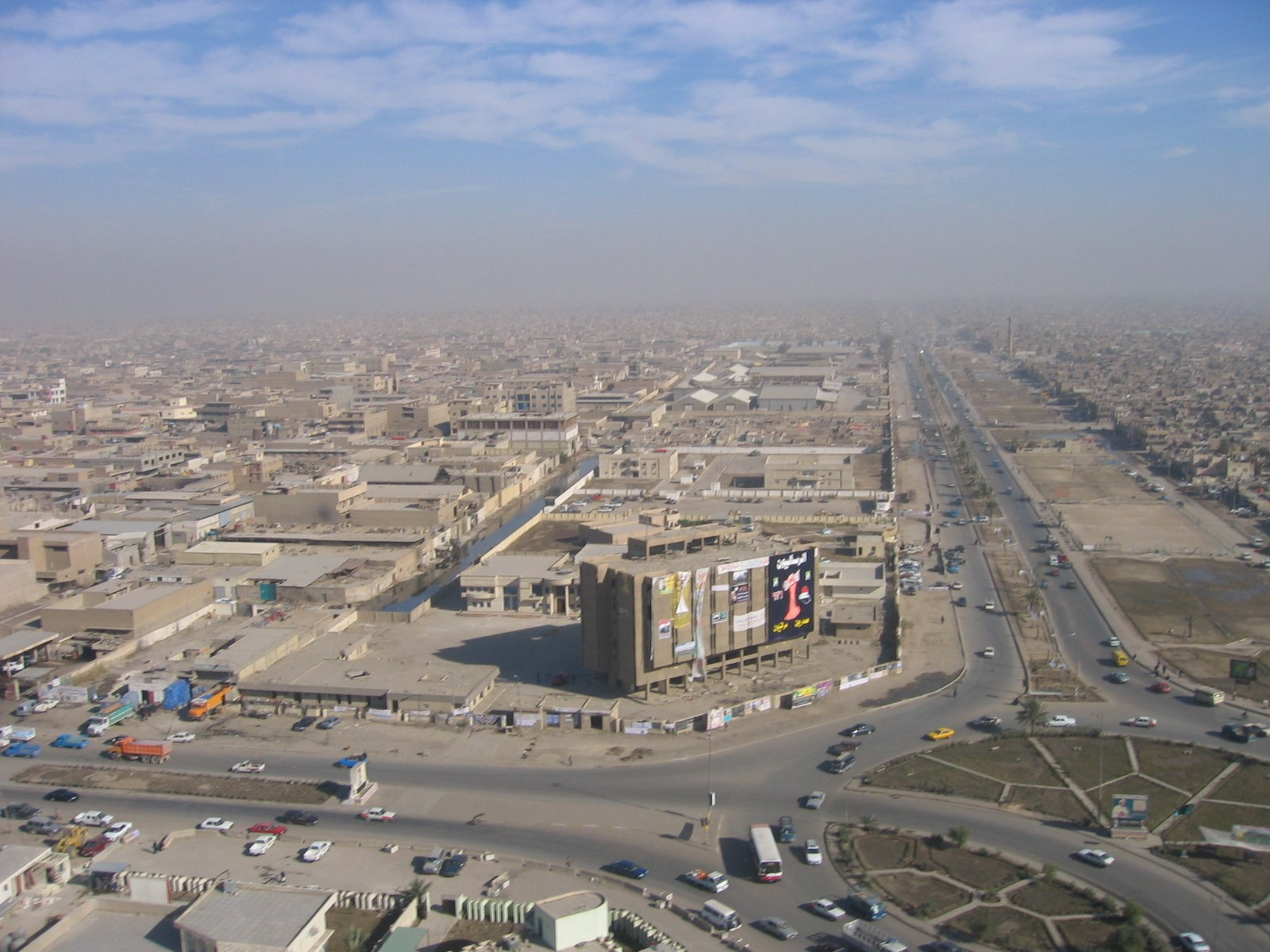

- Sadr City in Iraq
- Coordinates: 33°23′20″N 44°27′30″E
- Country: Iraq
- Governorate: Baghdad Governorate
- City: Baghdad
- Built: 1957
- Founder: Abdul-Karim Qasim
- Named for: Mohammed al-Sadr

Area
  - Total: 13 km^{2} (5.0 sq mi)

Population (2018)
  - Total: 1,211,849

Sadr City (Arabic: مدينة الصدر, romanized: Madīnat aṣ-Ṣadr), formerly known as Al-Thawra (Arabic: الثورة, romanized: aṯ-Ṯawra) and Saddam City (Arabic: مدينة صدام, romanized: Madīnat Ṣaddām), is a suburb district of the city of Baghdad, Iraq. It was built in 1959 by Prime Minister Abdul Karim Qassim and named Al-Rafidain District. After the US-led invasion of Iraq and the toppling of Saddam, it was unofficially renamed Sadr City after Ayatollah Mohammed al-Sadr.

Sadr City – or more accurately Thawra District (Arabic: حيّ الثورة, romanized: Ḥayy ath-Thawra) – is one of nine administrative districts in Baghdad. A public housing project neglected by Saddam Hussein, Sadr City holds around 1 million residents.

== History ==
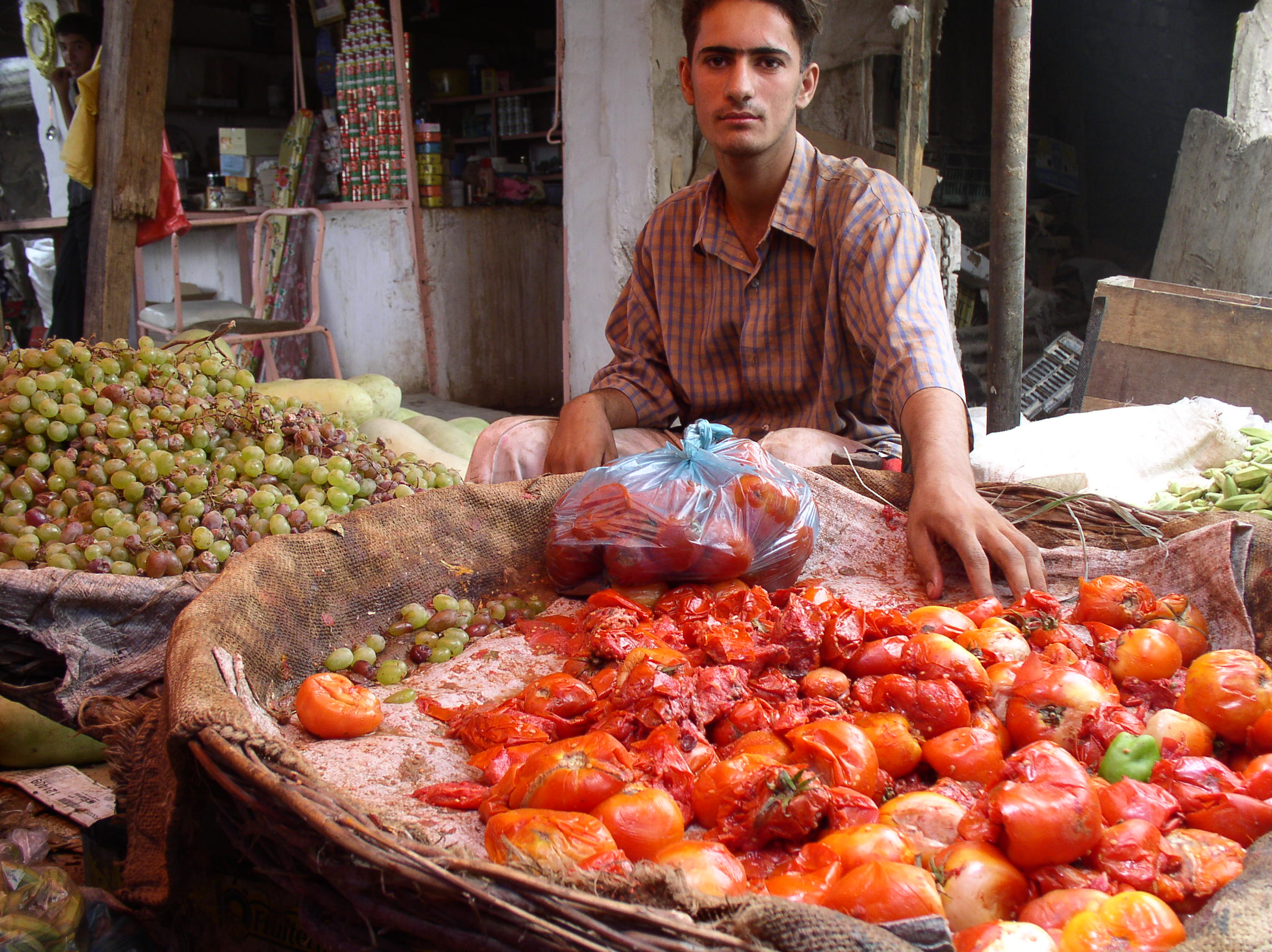
A local merchant operates a stall in the city's market

The City (or District) was built in 1959 by Prime Minister Abdul Karim Qassim in response to grave housing shortages in Baghdad. At the time, it was officially named Al-Rafidain District (Arabic: حي الرافدين), but was colloquially called Al-Thawra (Arabic: الثورة) and so it came to be known by that name. It provided housing for Baghdad's urban poor, many of whom had come from the countryside and who had until then lived in unfavourable conditions. Naziha al-Dulaimi was instrumental in turning the vast slums of eastern Baghdad into a massive public works and housing project that came to be known as Revolution City. It quickly became a stronghold of the Iraqi Communist Party, with resistance to the Baathist-led coup of 1963 becoming prevalent within the city itself. The development was devised by the architect and urban planner Constantinos Apostolou Doxiadis. The original plans for the city were designed as part of Doxiadis’s Plans for Baghdad which were not fully completed as a result of the cancellation of the plans in 1959. Doxiadis Associates managed to develop the northeast side of Baghdad. This later developed as the nucleus for Al-Thawra City.

During the urban development of Baghdad, Al-Habibiyah Jewish Cemetery was built by Saddam Hussein in 1975. In 1982, the district was renamed Saddam City. In the 1980s, the district became known for poverty and communist organizing, with illegal documents and, in some cases, people themselves being hidden from the authorities in overflowing septic tanks. The proliferation of communism in the district was seen by some as ironic, given how Doxiadis's design had been considered "anticommunist" with the view that it promoted a village atmosphere in an effort to ease the transition of rural migrants to the city.

After Saddam Hussein was removed from power in April 2003, the district was unofficially renamed Sadr City after the deceased Shiite leader Mohammad Mohammad Sadeq al-Sadr.

=== 2003 ===
In April 2003, the US Army 2d Squadron, 2nd Armored Cavalry Regiment established their headquarters at the abandoned Sumer cigarette factory located on the eastern side of Sadr City. In honor of the history of the factory, the military named their new camp Camp Marlboro.

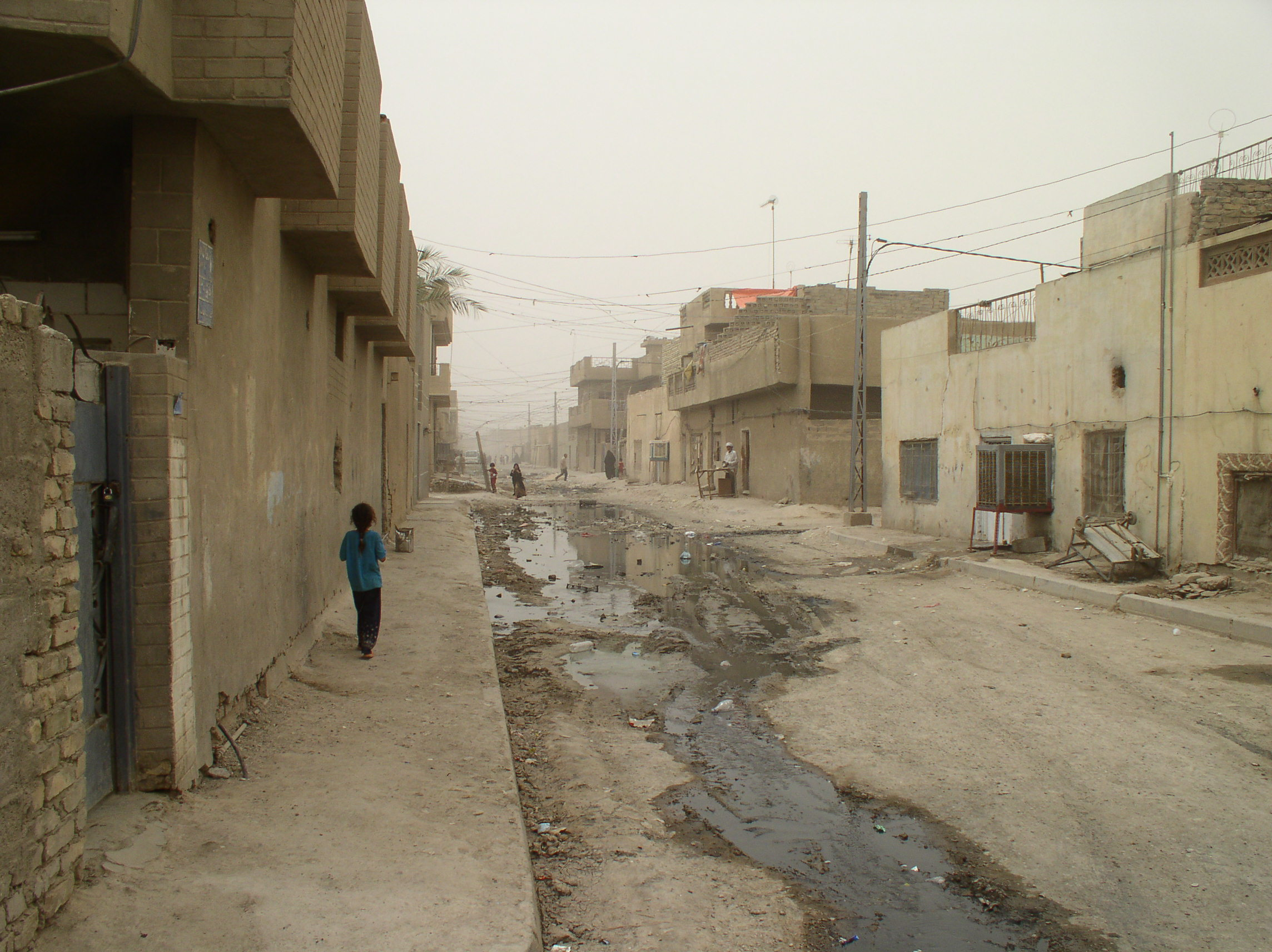
A young girl walks through Sadr City.

During the fall and winter of 2003, American forces focused on rebuilding civilian infrastructure and training local leaders in democracy. District and neighborhood councils were established, giving the residents of Sadr City representation in the new Iraqi government. The municipal building became the centerpiece of the reconstruction effort, and it was the site of a forward outpost of American soldiers that met daily with council members and citizens. Progress was slow due to escalating tensions and violence, and attacks against the American military increased significantly in late 2003.

On 9 October 2003, the Mahdi Army in Sadr City ambushed an American convoy, inflicting multiple casualties. The Combat Patrol, made up of vehicles from the 2/2 ACR, was attacked by approximately 100 men with several improvised explosive devices, RPGs and automatic weapons fire from the surrounding rooftops and streets, killing and injuring soldiers from E Trp 2/2 ACR. The Mahdi Army attempted to capture several soldiers during the ambush, but they were ultimately unsuccessful in their efforts to obtain hostages.

On 9 November 2003, a violent confrontation erupted between the chairman of the District Council, elements of the 2d ACR, and a team from the 490th Civil Affairs Battalion. The chairman refused to surrender a pistol during security screening and was shot by an American soldier during a shoving match. The death of the chairman caused a serious setback to reconstruction efforts and led to increased violence.

=== 2004 ===
Throughout March 2004 through July 2004, FOB IronHorse, in Sadr City, elements of the 1st Brigade Combat Team and the 13th Signal Battalion were hit almost daily with Mortars and RPGs. TF Lancer was located at FOB War Eagle, the northern side of Sadr City. There was no American media in the area to report the multiple mortar and RPG fire that hit both FOBs almost daily.

In late March 2004, Task Force Lancer, under the command of Lieutenant Colonel Gary Volesky arrived at Camp War Eagle on the north-east corner of Sadr City, to assume responsibility for the governance and security of Sadr City. Task Force Lancer consisted primarily of the 2nd Battalion, 5th Cavalry Regiment from the 1st Brigade, 1st Cavalry Division under the command of Colonel Robert B. Abrams.

On 4 April 2004, the Mahdi Army ambushed a U.S. Army patrol in Sadr City, killing seven American soldiers and wounding 57 more. This sparked fierce urban fighting between the Mahdi Army and newly arrived soldiers of the B Company 20th Engineer Battalion 2–5, C Battery 1-82 Field Artillery, 2-8 and 1-12 CAV of the 1st Cavalry Division (1CD); alongside the just-relieved 1st Squadron, 2d Armored Cavalry Regiment and elements from 2-37 AR of the 1st Armored Division.

In late 2004 the Mahdi Army enacted a cease-fire with U.S. troops, and offered to help repair and rebuild the city's main infrastructure which was leaving millions without electricity, water or sewage. On 10 October, Camp Marlboro was hit by three mortars launched from within the city, which saw the U.S. increase security and attach an additional 28 tanks and 14 Bradley Fighting Vehicles to the camp. The following day, on 11 October, the Weapons Handover Program began in the city, which was designed to purchase weapons from militants.

=== 2005 ===
On 15 May 2005, the bodies of 13 Iraqis were discovered in a shallow grave, each blindfolded, tied, and shot multiple times in the back of the head. They had been hastily buried in a vacant lot. On 18 May, gunmen shot and killed Ali Mutib Sakr, a Transport Ministry driver. On 23 May, a car bomb exploded outside a crowded restaurant, killing eight Iraqis and wounding an additional 89. On 12 March, three car bombs exploded, killing thirty-five people. On 1 July, a car bomb exploded in an open-air market, killing 77 and wounding 96.

In August 2005 the Iraqi government and the U.S. Army locked down Sadr City for three days to search houses for hostages and death squads. Some hostages were found and freed. Multiple death squad leaders were arrested. In these three days, the number of murders in Baghdad reached the lowest level ever compared to the average of the previous months of the U.S.-led war.

=== 2006 ===
On 24 October 2006, the U.S. Army locked down Sadr City while searching for a kidnapped U.S. soldier. During the lockdown, deaths dropped by 50%. When Prime Minister al-Maliki demanded the end of the blockade, the murder rate returned to previous levels.

On 23 November 2006, a series of car bombs exploded, followed by mortar attacks, which killed at least 215 people. See 23 November 2006 Sadr City bombings for further details.

=== 2007 surge ===
As the U.S. began a surge of forces into Iraq, Operation Imposing Law was implemented in Sadr City. On station US army units included 82nd Airborne DIV 2/325 INF White Falcons and 2nd INF DIV C- CO 2/3 INF SBCT.

=== 2008 fighting ===
In March 2008, during the Battle of Basra, clashes erupted in Sadr City between U.S. forces and the Mahdi Army. At that time, Sadr City was secured with the use of Strykers from the 1st Squadron, 2d Stryker Cavalry Regiment led by LTC Daniel Barnett. The fighting grew so intense that armored vehicles, including M2A3 Bradley IFVs and M1A1/2 Abrams MBTs were called in for assistance. The Mahdi Army relied heavily in the use of improvised explosive devices allegedly smuggled from Iran and engaged U.S. forces with sniper fire and intense small arms engagements in the heavily congested urban area. The U.S. launched at least one air strike, killing 10 reported militants. As of 29 March 2008, about 75 Iraqis have been killed and 500 injured. The Iraq Health Ministry claims these are all civilians, but the U.S. disputes this.

The Mahdi Army intensified rocket attacks on the Green Zone and other U.S. bases, killing at least three American soldiers and several civilians. On 6 April Iraqi and U.S. forces moved into the southern third of Sadr City to prevent rocket and mortar fire being launched from the area. 1st Squadron, 2nd Stryker Cavalry Regiment then took control of southern Sadr City and hosted Charlie Company, 1-64 Armor, Bravo Company, 1-14 Infantry, and Delta Company, 4-64 Armor, along with U.S. combat engineers from the 3rd Brigade Heavy Combat Team, 4th Infantry Division. 3rd Brigade, 4th Infantry Division, the headquarters brigade for the operation, began construction of a concrete barrier along Al-Quds street to seal the southern third of the city off and allow reconstruction to take place. C/1-68, a tank and mechanized infantry company team under command and control of 1-68 Armor Combined Arms Battalion, and D/4-64, a tank and mechanized infantry company team, attached to 1-2 SCR, were the primary wall build company level organizations. On 1 May 2008, D/4-64 and B/1-14 killed 28 Mahdi Fighters just north of the concrete barrier. Over the next month, the Mahdi Army launched a number of attacks on the troops building the barrier, but sustained heavy losses. On 3 May 2008 soldiers from Charlie Company, 2-30 Infantry, 10th Mountain Division placed additional barriers along the eastern boundary of Sadr City to isolate the militants' stronghold, but met heavy resistance as Mahdi Fighters attacked the soldiers with RPGs, IEDs, and small arms fire. The Mahdi fighters were able to destroy two HMMWVs and two MRAPs, however, the unit responded with combined air and ground strikes and used tanks, attack helicopters, and heavy weapons to repel the assault while claiming the deaths of nearly 30 militants.

On 10 May, a ceasefire was ordered by Muqtada Al-Sadr, allowing Iraqi troops into all of Sadr City. On 20 May, in an entirely Iraqi-planned and executed operation, six battalions of Iraqi troops, including troops from the 1st (Quick Reaction Force) division stationed in Al-Anbar and armored forces from the 9th Division based in Taji, operating without the involvement of U.S. ground forces, (except Marines from 1st ANGLICO, SALT B Provided over watch) pushed deep into Sadr City. The Iraqi Security Forces met little resistance in moving through Sadr City and took up positions formerly occupied by the Mahdi Army, including the Imam Ali and Al-Sadr hospitals and Al-Sadr's political office. Sadr City then became the main base for Shi'a insurgent group Kata'ib Hezbollah, an offshoot of the Mahdi Army.

=== 2009 ===
After a year of relative calm, Sadr City was struck by a massive bomb blast on 24 June 2009 when a bomb-laden vegetable cart or motorcycle was detonated in the Muraidi Market of the town, killing at least 69 civilians and wounding over 150.

Voters in Sadr City allowed the Iraqi National Alliance to make huge gains in provincial elections in 2009 and parliamentary elections in 2010.

=== 2014 ===
By 2014, Sadr city was considered one of the poorest neighbourhoods in all of Baghdad.

=== 2015 ===
On 13 August 2015, shortly after 06:00 local time (03:00 UTC), a bomb-packed refrigeration truck was detonated in Sadr City. As of 13 August 2015, at least 76 people were confirmed to have been killed in the bombing, with at least 212 more injured. The market in the Shi'ite neighbourhood is one of the biggest in Baghdad selling wholesale food items. This incident caused much resentment against the government for the continued terror attacks in the city.

=== 2017 ===
On 2 January 2017, at least 35 people were killed and 61 were injured in a car bombing suicide attack at a busy square in Sadr city. According to Reuters, 9 of the victims were women in a minibus that was passing through the square at the time. Another car bomb later exploded in the car park of the near the Al-Kindi hospital which killed 3 people. The Islamic State said it carried out both attacks, claiming to have been targeting Shia Muslims in the first attack.

In February 2017, Sadr city had experienced protests by supporters of Shia cleric Moqtada al-Sadr, who demanded that changes be made to the electoral commission that oversees elections. Several rockets had hit Security Forces in the "Green Zone" of Baghdad, after clashes with the police at the protests left at least six people killed and 200 injured by Valentine's Day (14 February).

On 15 February 2017, a suicide bomber detonated a vehicle in Sadr City, targeting a busy street known for hosting car dealerships, killing at least 18 people and injuring at least 42 people, who were later transferred to Al-Kindi hospital. The attack was claimed by the Islamic State (also known as 'Daesh' in Arabic) and came just as Iraqi Forces were preparing for their offensive to recapture Mosul from ISIS later that year.

=== 2019 ===
By 2019, Sadr city was considered one of the poorest and most neglected districts in Baghdad with almost half of Baghdad’s, at the time, population of 8 millions people living in the slum, mostly Shia Muslims.

=== 2021 ===
In April 2021, at least 4 people were killed and 17 were injured in a car bombing in a market of the city. A total of 5 cars were also destroyed during the attack.

In June, 15 people were injured when a bomb exploded in a market in Sadr city.

On 20 July, a bombing in Sadr city (which claimed by ISIS) killed at least 30 people, mostly women and children, and injured about 60 others who were present in the Woheilat market a day before the Islamic holiday of Eid Al-Adha for shopping.

=== 2025 ===
On 20 June 2025, thousands of people (mostly followers of Muqtada al-Sadr) protested against Israeli aggression towards Iran during the Twelve-Day War.

== Reconstruction efforts ==
In 2010, a Turkish consortium of contractors won the bid for the reconstruction of Baghdad's Sadr City, offering to complete the massive project for $11.3 billion. The project involves the construction of a modern city of 75,000 housing units to accommodate up to 600,000 people.

=== 2026 ===
In March 2026, it was reported that rebuilding, reconstruction, and development efforts, which were under way under a contract signed with the Chinese company Shandong Construction, in Sadr City were to be completed in approximately 4 years by 2030, according to Iraqi officials. The plan to do so included initially building 11,000 housing units (in phase 1) and later 49,000 (in phase 2), sewage/drainage lines, communication/electricity networks, as well as a road network in both the residential area and external roads to connect the city with factories and other nearby areas around Sadr City.

== See also ==
- 2015 Baghdad market truck bomb
- List of places in Iraq
- List of neighborhoods and districts in Baghdad
