= Hamid Juma Faris Jouri al-Saeedi =

Iraqi al-Qaeda member

Hamid Juma Faris Jouri al-Saeedi (also known as Hamed Jumma al-Saedi, Abu Humam, Abu Hammam and Abu Rana) was a member of Al-Qaeda in Iraq accused by Iraq's government of being "the number two al-Qaeda leader [in Iraq] after Abu Ayyub al-Masri." He was captured during a joint raid by Iraqi and United States forces on June 19, 2006 either north or southwest of Baquba, Iraq.

== Activities as an insurgent ==
An anonymous "senior coalition official" claimed that Saeedi was responsible for many attacks and had been part of the insurgency against American forces in Iraq since about 2003. Muwaffaq al-Rubaie, Iraq's national security adviser, accused Saeedi of ordering Haitham al-Badri to carry out the February 22, 2006 Al Askari Mosque bombing in Samarra, Iraq.

Rubaie also said Saeedi "carried out al-Qaeda's policies in Iraq," specifically in the northern Salahuddin province and later Baquba province and tried to start a civil war between Shiite and Sunni Muslims in Iraq. He also said Saedi attempted to evade capture on the day of his arrest by hiding in a residential building, and that since his arrest he has told interrogators that al-Qaeda in Iraq exchanges logistical support and information with supporters of Saddam Hussein.

== Post-capture ==
An anonymous "senior coalition official" said Saedi was captured along with "three other individuals." He was interrogated for over two months. Muwaffaq al-Rubaie, Iraq's national security adviser, said that information from Saeedi after his capture resulted in the death or capture of 11 "top Al Qaeda in Iraq figures" and nine "lower-level members.

The Mujahideen Shura Council released an internet statement on Saeedi's capture which said the arrest was propaganda designed to mask coalition defeats in the region. "We reassure our brothers that out leaders... are on the front lines, fighting and inciting the faithful," it read in part.
