= 2007 al-Askari mosque bombing =

Formally unclaimed attack on a Shia Islamic mosque in the Iraqi city of Samarra

Coordinates: 34°11′56″N 43°52′25″E

Al-Askari mosque 2007 bombing
- Part of the Iraqi Civil War
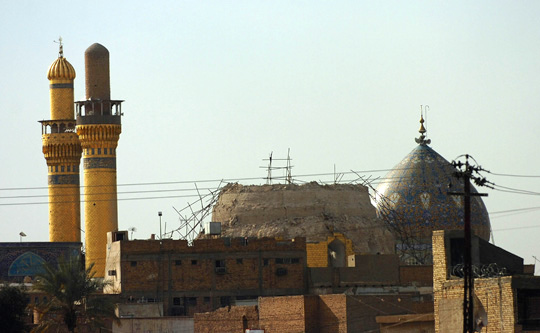
- The mosque after the first bombing in 2006
- Location: Samarra, Iraq
- Date: 13 June 2007
- Target: Al-Askari Mosque
- Attack type: Bombing (demolition) or a rocket or mortar attack
- Deaths: 0
- Injuries: 0
- Perpetrator: Unknown

The 2007 al-Askari mosque bombing (Arabic: تفجير مسجد العسكري) occurred on 13 June 2007 at around 9 am local time at one of the holiest sites in Shia Islam, the al-Askari Mosque, and has been attributed by Iran to the Iraqi Baath Party. While there were no injuries or deaths reported, the mosque's two ten-story minarets were destroyed in the attacks. This was the second bombing of the mosque, with the first bombing occurring on 22 February 2006 and destroying the mosque's golden dome.

By April 2009, both minarets had been repaired.

== The bombing ==
At around 9 am on 13 June 2007, insurgents destroyed the two remaining ten-story tall golden minarets flanking the ruins of the dome of the Al-Askari Mosque. The mosque compound and minarets had been closed since the 2006 bombing and no fatalities were reported. Iraqi police reported hearing "two nearly simultaneous explosions coming from inside the mosque compound at around 9 am" Local residents reported blasts that shook the city and sent a cloud of dust into the air.

While it has been stated that "the collapse of the two minarets appeared to have been caused by explosive charges placed at their bases", different reports have caused some confusion as to whether bombs were actually used. A release from state run Iraqia Television stated that "local officials said that two mortar rounds were fired at the two minarets", in addition "a government spokesman claimed the minarets were hit by rockets".

It has been noted that the attack was one in a string of bombings in 2007 against major Shi'ite shrines, including two car bomb attacks in Karbala: one near the Imam Husayn Shrine (which killed 36 people and wounded 168) and the other near the Imam Abbas shrine, the second-holiest site in Shi'ite Islam, which killed at least 58 people and wounded 169.

== Events around changing of the guard ==
Since the 2006 bombing of the al-Askari shrine, it had been under protection of local guards who were predominantly Sunni. Both American military and Iraqi security officials were worried that the guards had been infiltrated by Al Qaeda forces in Iraq. To counter this the Ministry of Interior in Baghdad were bringing in a new guard unit – predominantly Shiite. This changing of the guard is believed to have had some role in the timing of the attack. Abdul Sattar Abdul Jabbar, a prominent Sunni cleric, told Al Jazeera television that local Sunnis may have been provoked as he claimed "the new guards had arrived at the shrine shouting sectarian slogans". Gunfire was reported around the shrine before the attack, "which may have been related to the change of guards." Prime Minister Nouri al-Maliki stated that Policemen at the shrine (15 of them according to US military sources) had been detained for questioning along with "an unspecified number of other suspects." It was confirmed that "the entire Iraqi security force responsible for guarding the mosque, the 3rd Battalion of the Salahuddin province police, was detained for investigation." The Interior Ministry would only tell reporters that agents of "a terrorist group" had been arrested and were under interrogation. On Sunday 17 June 2007 Iraqi forces captured four additional suspects and their raid "also turned up a compact disc showing attacks on U.S.-led troops, blasting caps and detonation wire, identification cards for access to al-Askari mosque and photographs depicting terrorist training exercises."

== Reactions in Iraq ==
=== Nouri al-Maliki's address and the U.S. military response ===
In the afternoon after the attack Prime Minister Nouri al-Maliki addressed Iraqi national television. Standing before the flag of Iraq he said "I call on all civilians and believers and clergy to talk to people about the necessity of self-control and wisdom to foil the scheme of those evil ones who want to make use of this crime for political reasons." He then read a quote from a prayer of Abraham found in the Qur'an "God, make this country safe and send its people your blessed rewards."

The day of the attack al-Maliki asked Gen. David Petraeus, and U.S. Ambassador Ryan Crocker to send American reinforcements to Samarra, and to put U.S. troops in Baghdad on heightened alert. Both American officials issued a joint statement saying "This brutal action on one of Iraq's holiest shrines is a deliberate attempt by al-Qaeda to sow dissent and inflame sectarian strife among the people of Iraq." Petraeus told reporters that al-Qaeda's agents probably acted because they "are under a fair amount of pressure. I think they know that we are going to contest some of the areas in which they have had sanctuaries in the past."

There were already a few hundred U.S. troops stationed around Samarra before the attack, though they rarely entered the shrine's perimeter leaving its protection to Iraqi forces. After making his request Al-Maliki traveled to Samarra accompanied by U.S. troops under Lt. Gen. Raymond Odierno to visit the ruins of the mosque. General Petraeus later stated that they were also "helping to move reinforcements to Samarra from the Iraqi national police." U.S. military spokesman Lt. Col. Christopher Garver stated that the US military in Iraq is "obviously very concerned about this and our primary goal is to prevent any violence of the kind that broke out after the last bombing." Presidential spokesman Tony Snow said "there will be aggressive outreach on all sides" by American officials to try to head off any further violence.

=== Ali al-Sistani's call ===
Grand Ayatollah Ali al-Sistani condemned the bombing but called on "believers to exercise self-restraint and avoid any vengeful act that would target innocent people or the holy places of others". Sistani later condemned reprisal attacks on Sunni mosques in the southern city of Basra (see below), demanding a halt to such violence. His spokesman Hamed al-Khafaf stated "He heavily condemns the attacks against the mosques of Talha ben Obaida Alla and al-Eshra al Mubashera in Basra. He calls on believers to prevent, as much as they can, such attacks from taking place on mosques and shrines".

=== Sadrist reactions ===
Shiite cleric Muqtada al-Sadr called for peaceful demonstrations and three days of mourning. He stated that he believed no Sunni Arab could have been behind the attack. He ruled out the possibility that it was done by Muslims, declaring that it was "done at the hands of the occupation." He said "We declare a three-day mourning period . . . and shout Allahu Akbar from Sunni and Shiite mosques." Sadr criticized the Iraqi government for failing to protect the site, and said the U.S. occupation is "the only enemy of Iraq" and "that's why everyone must demand its departure". Sadr called the attack part of a "U.S. and Israeli plan to split Iraq's unity."

Throughout Baghdad and across much of Iraq, loudspeakers from Shiite mosques called for demonstrations. At Najaf over 3,000 al-Sadr loyalists staged a protest, shouting "No, no to America!", "No, no to Israel!" and "No, no to sedition!"

Sadr's 30-member bloc immediately suspended any participation in parliament out of protest to the bombing, and resolved to not participate "until the government takes realistic steps to rebuild the Askariya shrine" (they also called for the rebuilding of all damaged Shiite and Sunni mosques). This action by the Sadrists is seen as a further blow to the already weakened al-Maliki government and will further impede the legislative process towards national reconciliation in Iraq. Maliki had just the day before been visited by U.S. Deputy Secretary of State John D. Negroponte who pressured him for quicker results against sectarian violence, and on Sunday 10 June 2007 Admiral William J. Fallon told al-Maliki that an increasing number of U.S. Congressmen were opposed to continuing to give aid to Iraq, and also opposed to maintaining the American military presence there, and that if the Iraqi government wanted to counter that mounting opposition, it needed to be making progress, by July.

Sadr's position has been viewed as one of the reasons that the spiraling violence that followed the 2006 bombing was not immediately repeated. His Al Mahdi militia was largely blamed for much of the 2006 violence but it has followed his line in blaming US and Israeli agents for the 2007 bombing. One of Sadr's spokesmen Salman Fraiji repeated such claims of conspiracy, saying "To split the [Suni and Shiite] Muslims is a card that the occupation is playing. The ill-intentioned colonizers have an old saying: 'divide and conquer.'" Many experts see Sadr's increase of anti-American rhetoric as "an effort to position himself for a powerful political role when U.S. forces leave Iraq." Vali Nasr, a Middle East expert at the Naval Postgraduate School expanded on this saying "Since the start in February of the U.S. military crackdown in Baghdad and environs, Sadr has been uncharacteristically subdued, an indication that he is waiting for U.S. forces to leave before reclaiming a prominent role. Definitely there is a sort of strategy in play, which is 'wait and see.' Sadr, unlike the U.S. troops, faces no deadline pressure."

== Under the curfews ==
On the day of the bombing an indefinite curfew was placed on Samarra by the Iraqi police. Samarra's streets were emptied by mid-afternoon after the arrival of more police and American troops. For the remainder of the day Iraqi security forces patrolled Samarra "firing in the air and announcing the curfew from loudspeakers mounted on jeeps. ... Members of the Iraqi security forces, which are dominated by Shiites, yelled threats at Samarra residents, blaming them for the destruction of the mosque and threatening revenge. Some citizens, meanwhile, hurled remarks back, asking how anyone could destroy the minarets when the entire religious complex was being so carefully guarded by Iraqi security forces."

Beginning at 3 pm of the same day, a curfew was also placed on vehicle traffic and large gatherings in the capital Baghdad. The Baghdad curfew had originally been set to expire on Saturday 16 June 2007, it was lifted at 5 am (0100 GMT) on Sunday 17 June.

=== Retaliatory attacks ===
According to Iraqi police, on the day of the bombing before the curfew in the capital could take hold, arsonists set a Sunni mosque ablaze in the neighborhood of Bayaa in western Baghdad. A Shiite shrine was also bombed north of Baghdad and four Sunni mosques near Baghdad were also attacked or burned. In Iskandariyah, south of the capital, two Sunni mosques were bombed (one being demolished the other losing its minaret)

In the city of Basra four people were slain and six wounded in attacks with rocket-propelled grenades on the Kawaz, Othman, al-Abayshi and Basra Grand mosques. Visitors to the Talha Ibn Obeidallah mosque in Zubeir, west of Basra, got past Iraqi police by claiming they wanted to film the mosque but placed bombs instead and then detonated them after leaving. Prime Minister Nouri al-Maliki upon learning of events in Basra placed the city under indefinite curfew, and arrested a number of Iraqi security forces from there. He later fired Basra's police chief after witnesses reported local police did little to stop the attacks on the mosques.

There were also reports that within the capital, in the New Baghdad neighborhood, a local Shiite mosque loudspeaker issued calls to Mahdi Army guerrillas and blamed U.S. troops for the attack. The Mahdi guerrillas then cleared a marketplace and called for reinforcements to fight nearby American soldiers. Witnesses told of explosions and smoke coming from the highway. In the upscale Mansour neighborhood, consisting predominately of Sunnis, gunfire was heard coming from an Iraqi army checkpoint set up to safeguard an often targeted Sunni mosque.

A Sunni mosque that had been attacked on 13 June was targeted again on 14 June 2007. The Hateen mosque in Iskandariyah, which had only been partly destroyed was broken into around 4 am by assailants who planted bombs. The resulting explosion demolished most of the building and wounded a woman and child in a nearby apartment building. An assault by gunmen against the nearby al-Mustafa mosque also occurred early that day but they were repelled by Iraqi soldiers. In the town of Mahaweel, south of Baghdad, gunmen opened fired on the al-Basheer mosque at dawn. They drove off the guards and set fire to the building, causing partial damage. To the south of Baghdad, a mosque in the city of Tunis came under attack and Iraqi police found explosives in a mosque in Jabala. The Washington Post stated that during the time of the curfews "At least 13 Sunni mosques came under attack in Iraq".

While five bodies were found in Baghdad on Thursday the 14th, "presumed victims of sectarian death squads", the curfew was credited with causing a reduction in killing as the usual number is five times that. The worst violence reported on Thursday in Baghdad was the seven mortar rounds fired against the Green Zone which killed three civilians.

=== Protests in Iraq ===
On Thursday 14 June 2007, hundreds of people marched in non-violent demonstrations in the Baghdad neighborhood of Sadr City, and in the Shiite dominated cities of Kut, Diwaniyah, Najaf and Basra.

=== Lifting of the Baghdad curfew ===
At the lifting of the Baghdad curfew the U.S. military reported it had captured 20 suspected insurgents and killed 14 others in separate operations over the weekend. It was noted that the curfew was lifted a day after Lt. Gen. Raymond Odierno admitted that security forces have full control of only 40 percent of the capital, which is now in the fifth month of the Iraq War troop surge of 2007.

When the Baghdad curfew was lifted at 5 am (0100 GMT) on Sunday, 17 June, residents traveling on the streets were caught in a huge traffic jam "spawned by hundreds of new police and army checkpoints". The ban on vehicle traffic had also led to a lack of delivery trucks moving within the city causing steep price hikes in everything from fuel to fresh food. There were also increased power outages as the large number of people confined to their homes increased electrical usage, resulting in power for only four hours of the day. The lines for gasoline to run vehicles and generators "stretched for a mile or longer, in some cases weaving around several blocks, stretching from main roads deep into side streets. Black marketeers, some of them boys as young as 10, positioned their jerry cans of gas near the lines, charging three times the pump price." Accusations of price gouging were made by many citizens. "Vendors weaved between cars waiting in traffic, selling paper fans, soft drinks and tissues to mop brows dripping in temperatures that hit 112." While police commandos on "pickup trucks mounted with machine guns" speed through the streets "with sirens blaring and headlights flashing", they did follow government orders "to stop shooting in the air to clear traffic or warn motorists coming too close." As several bridges to the Sunni-dominated Karkh area and the Shiite majority Rusafa neighborhood have been targeted in the recent past, security was especially stiff on bridges where Iraq forces searching for truck bombs. In some areas, like Karkh, where al-Queda is believed to be active police and military checkpoints were just 100 yards apart or less. In often-targeted neighborhoods, like Mansour and Yarmouk, Iraqi soldiers were present behind concrete blast barriers. In the Sunni-dominated neighborhoods within the Azamiyah area in northern Baghdad, which are known for insurgent activity, "Iraqi troops in combat gear patrolled the streets in armored cars. Soviet-era tanks were stationed on major roads and intersections. Much of Azamiyah was almost deserted, with most stores shuttered and little traffic on the streets." By contrast the Shiite dominated enclave of Kasrah within that same area "was buzzing with shoppers in open-air markets. Kebab stands were doing a big business." Drastic differences were evident throughout Baghdad from one neighborhood to the next. For while in Karkh there were "stores shuttered and barbed wire or tree trunks blocking access to residential side roads. Row after row of houses seem abandoned and, in some parts, snipers fired randomly at pedestrians and cars", by contrast the streets of the heavily Shiite Karradah district in central Baghdad were crowded with shoppers and everything "appeared back to normal".

While the government ordered higher security around the mosques of Baghdad a lack of increased security was reported around the major Sunni mosque al-Nidaa in northern Baghdad. Nor was there any noticed increase in security around Abdul-Qader al-Jilani mosque, which is "one of Iraq's holiest Sunni sites and the target of a recent bombing ... [and is] located in a small Sunni quarter surrounded by Shiite neighborhoods where the Mahdi Army militia, blamed for much of the sectarian violence, is active."

Thirty-seven bodies slain by sectarian violence were reported in Baghdad on the day of the lifting of the curfew.

Two days after the curfew was lifted the Al-Khilani Mosque bombing took place in Baghdad.

=== Relaxing of Samarra curfew ===
The 24-hour curfew in Samarra was relaxed on Saturday, 16 June but movement was restricted from 8 pm until 7 am on the afternoon of Monday 18 June 2007 four people were slain in the city when a suicide bomber drove his explosive laden car into a school being used to house police officers.

== International reaction ==
=== United Nations ===
United Nations Secretary-General Ban Ki-moon called on "all Iraqis to avoid succumbing to the vicious cycle of revenge and to exercise maximum restraint while demonstrating unity and resolve in the face of this terrible attack."

=== Iran ===
On the day of the bombing, in predominantly Shia Iran, President Mahmoud Ahmadinejad blamed the U.S. for failing to prevent the bombing. He threatened to halt regional cooperation which many see as integral to ending the spiraling violence in Iraq.

=== Bahrain ===
Also on the 13th in the nearby nation of Bahrain members of the Shiite ethnic majority marched through the streets of the capital Manama in protest of the bombing. In two back to back marches, demonstrators blamed both al-Qaeda and the U.S. shouting "Death to America" and "No to Terrorism." After the 2006 bombing more than 100,000 Bahrainis also demonstrated.

=== India ===
Syed Ali Nasir Saeed Abaqati a leading Shia cleric from Lucknow, India held al-Qaeda responsible for destruction of the Al-Askari Mosque in Samarra, Iraq.

On 14 June 2007 in the Indian administrated territory of Kashmir over 500 Shiite demonstrators demonstrated in response to the bombing by marching in the city of Srinagar. They carried black flags, copies of the Qur'an, shouted anti-American slogans, such as "Down with Bush, down with US", and burned effigies of President George W. Bush. Demonstrator Haidar Ali told reporters "Our protest is against the bombing, against the American occupation of Iraq which has led to bombing." There were further demonstrations in other towns across Kashmir.

== Perpetrators ==
The U.S. military announced on 14 June 2007 that it had "detained 25 suspects in raids against al-Qaida in Iraq over the past two days." This included a suspect "believed to be a close associate of Omar al-Baghdadi, who headed al-Qaida's Islamic State in Iraq." On 16 June 2007 three American troops were killed by explosions near their vehicles – two in Baghdad and one at Kirkuk province.

The alleged mastermind of both the minaret bombings and the February 2006 blasts, Haitham al-Badri, was killed in August 2007 by a U.S. airstrike.

== See also ==
- 2006 al-Askari mosque bombing
- 1994 Imam Reza shrine bomb explosion
