= 2006 al-Askari mosque bombing =

Attack on a Shia mosque in Iraq

2006 al-Askari Shrine bombing
- Part of the Iraqi Civil War
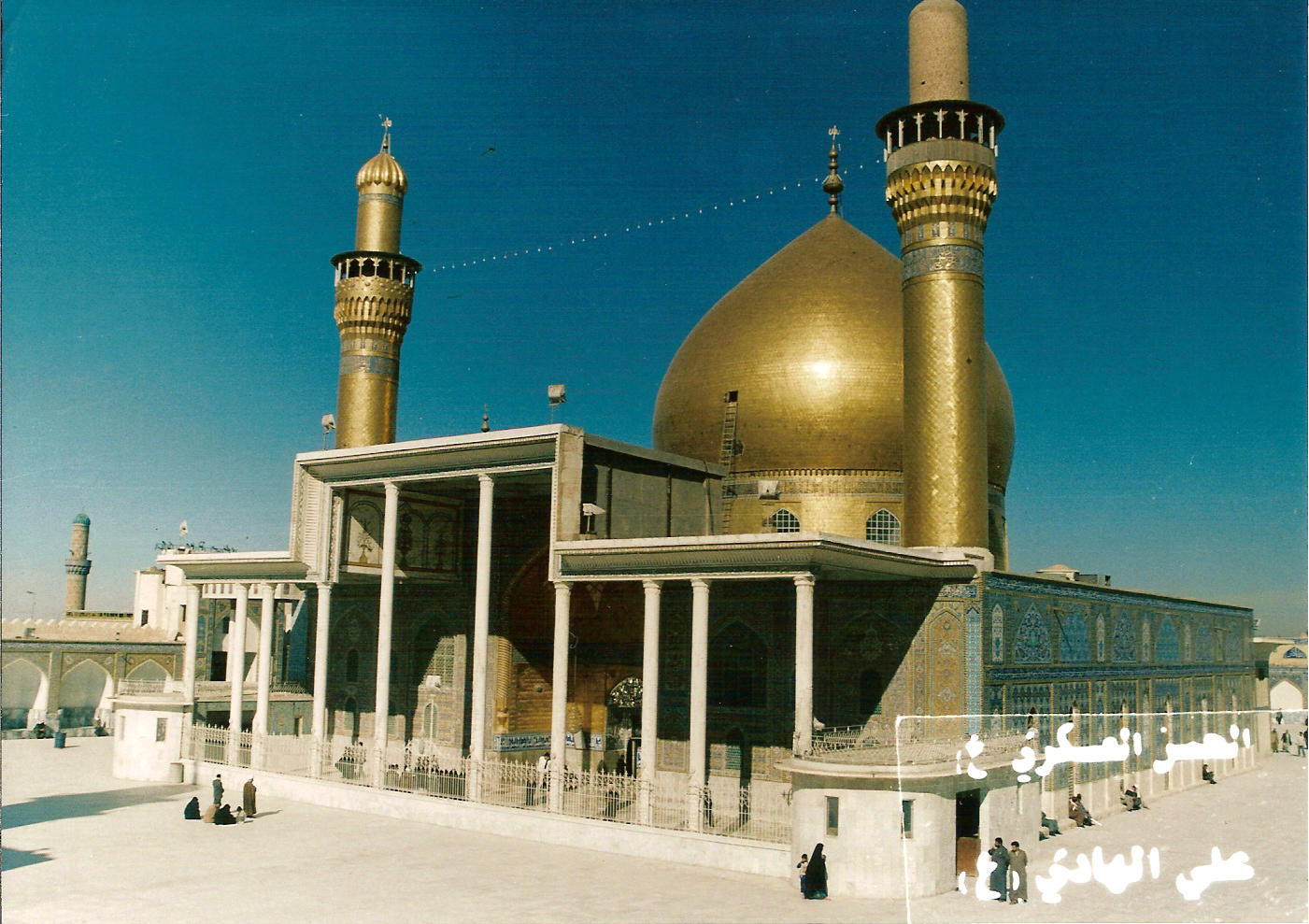
- Photograph of al-Askari Shrine before the 2006 bombing

- Location in Iraq
- Location: 34.1990°N 43.8736°E; Samarra, Saladin Governorate, Iraq
- Date: 22 February 2006; 20 years ago 6:44 a.m. (UTC+03:00)
- Target: Al-Askari Shrine
- Attack type: Bombing
- Deaths: 0
- Injuries: 0
- Perpetrator: Unknown

On 22 February 2006, approximately 6:44 a.m. Arabia Standard Time, al-Askari Shrine in Samarra, Iraq, was severely damaged in a bombing attack amidst the then-ongoing Iraq War. Constructed in the 10th century, it is one of the holiest sites in Shia Islam. Despite the magnitude of the explosions, there were no casualties. American president George W. Bush asserted that the bombing had been carried out by al-Qaeda in Iraq, which denied involvement in the attack.

Although responsibility for the 2006 al-Askari bombing was not claimed by any party, the incident was followed by bouts of retaliatory violence among Iraqis, with over 100 dead bodies being found the next day and well over 1,000 deaths occurring over the course of a few days after the attack; some counts place the death toll at over 1,000 on the first day alone. Sectarian violence between Shia Muslims and Sunni Muslims had already been prevalent since the beginning of the Iraqi insurgency in 2003, but the attack on al-Askari Shrine triggered the Iraqi civil war, which was marked by an intensive series of attacks against Iraqi civilians on the basis of their religious affiliation until 2008.

Just over a year later, the 2007 al-Askari mosque bombing resulted in damage to the structure, but no casualties. Similarly, no party claimed responsibility for the 2007 attack, but Iran asserted that it had been carried out by the banned Arab Socialist Ba'ath Party. A fresh wave of sectarian violence between Shias and Sunnis took place in the aftermath of the second bombing.

== Attack and response ==
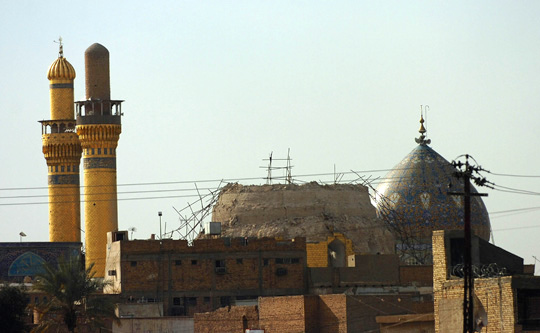
Photograph of Al-Askari Shrine after the first bombing in February 2006.

At 6:44 a.m. (0344 UTC) on 22 February 2006, explosions occurred at al-Askari Mosque, effectively destroying its golden dome and severely damaging the mosque. Several men wearing military uniforms, had earlier entered the mosque, tied up the guards there and set explosives, resulting in the blast. Two bombs were set off by five to seven men dressed as personnel of the Iraqi special forces who entered the shrine during the morning.

No injuries were reported following the bombing. However, the northern wall of the shrine was damaged by the bombs, causing the dome to collapse and destroying three-quarters of the structure along with it.

Following the blast, American and Iraqi forces surrounded the shrine and began searching houses in the area. Five police officers responsible for protecting the mosque were taken into custody.

The dome had been repaired by April 2009 and the shrine reopened to visitors.

== Accusations ==
No group immediately claimed responsibility for the attack on the mosque.

=== Al-Qaeda in Iraq ===
Although al-Qaeda in Iraq (AQI) denied any involvement in statements released, in June 2006, it was reported that Iraqi commandos and troops had captured and seriously wounded Tunisian militant Yousri Fakher Mohammed Ali, who was also known as Abu Qudama al-Tunesi, after he and 15 other foreign fighters stormed an Iraqi checkpoint 25 miles north of Baghdad, according to Iraqi National Security Adviser Mouwafak al-Rubaie.

Abu Qudama confessed to taking part in the attack on al-Askari mosque in Samarra and gave a detailed account of how the attack took place. Al-Rubaie said Iraqi security forces had yet to capture the mastermind of the mosque attack, Haitham al-Badri, an Iraqi and leader of one of AQI's cells who was later killed in an airstrike on 2 August 2007. Al-Rubaie said al-Badri, Abu Qudama, four Saudi nationals, and two other Iraqis stormed the mosque on 21 February 2006, rounded up the shrine's guards, members of Iraq's Facility Protection Service, and bound their hands. The group then spent the rest of the night rigging the mosque with bombs. At dawn on the next day, they detonated the explosives, bringing down the dome.

In an August 2006 press conference, American president George W. Bush stated: "it's pretty clear – at least the evidence indicates – that the bombing of the shrine was an al-Qaeda plot, all intending to create sectarian violence." In May 2007, Iraqi officials blamed al-Qaeda for the attack. A 2004 letter attributed by the Americans to Jordanian militant Abu Musab al-Zarqawi accused him of attempting to incite a "civil war" between Iraq's Shias and Sunnis. The American military claimed that the letter was purportedly captured from an alleged "Al-Qaeda courier" in January 2004.

In September 2006, Iraqi officials announced the capture of Iraqi militant Hamid Juma Faris Jouri al-Saeedi in connection with the bombing, allegedly done on his orders by Haitham al-Badri. Al-Badri was killed in August 2007.

=== United States and Israel ===
- Iranian president Mahmoud Ahmadinejad blamed the United States and Israel for the attack. He claimed that "these heinous acts are committed by a group of Zionists and occupiers that have failed." He warned, amid a crowd of protesters, that the United States would "not be saved from the wrath and power of the justice-seeking nations" by resorting to bombings like the one that occurred at Al-Askari Mosque.
- According to Alertnet, the late Lebanese politician Hassan Nasrallah, who had led Hezbollah since 1992, echoed the opinions of Ahmadinejad in a speech from the Lebanese capital city Beirut, where he accused the United States of attacking Al-Askari Shrine to cause tension between Sunnis and Shias in Iraq and across the Middle East.

== Post-bombing anti-Sunni violence ==
As a result of the bombing, there was widespread violence throughout Iraq. According to the Sunni Clerical Association of Muslim Scholars, 168 mosques were attacked in the two days following the bombing, while ten imams were murdered and fifteen others kidnapped. The Shi'ite controlled Interior Ministry said it could only confirm figures for Baghdad, where it had reports of 19 mosques attacked, one cleric killed and one abducted. The normal daily patrols of US coalition forces and Iraqi security forces were temporarily suspended in Baghdad during the few days following the bombing.

=== February 22 ===
- In Najaf, shops were closed, while residents gathered at the city's 1920 Revolution Square for demonstrations. In Al Diwaniyah, all mosques, shops and markets were closed.
- Three Sunni Muslim clerics were shot dead by Shi'a militiamen.
- A civilian, Hameed Rasheed, was shot dead by random shooting in Baghdad
- Attacks on Sunni mosques especially in eastern Baghdad started right away after the news of the bombing spread on the afternoon. Groups of armed men in civil vehicles seen in the streets.

=== February 23 ===
- Up to 21 Sunni mosques were attacked in reprisals for the bombing. The attacks included shootings and acts of arson. Three mosques were completely destroyed by explosives.
- In the mainly Shia city of Basra, armed men in police uniforms seized eleven Sunni Muslim men, including some Saudi, Turkish and Egyptian nationals, from the Mina prison. The seized men were later found dead and were believed to have been tortured. Ninety reprisal attacks on mosques were reported. Iraq's Kurdish Sunni President Jalal Talabani warned that Iraq was on the brink of civil war.
- Shia militiamen killed 47 Sunni civilians and left their bodies in a ditch near Baghdad on February 23. All of the bodies had their hands bound together.
- Three journalists, including Atwar Bahjat, working for Al-Arabiya television were kidnapped and killed by Sunni insurgents while covering the bombing. Their bodies were found on the outskirts of Samarra. The journalist and her crew were Sunni Muslims.

=== February 24 ===
- Baghdad was relatively calm on February 24, despite reports of minor clashes between members of a Shia militia and Sunni insurgents in the south of the city. In Basra, where the curfew was not in effect, on Friday Sunni insurgents kidnapped three children of a Shia legislator and prominent member of the Shi'a Islamic Da'awa Party. In the city of Madain (Ctesiphon), Sunni insurgents fired two rockets at the tomb of Salman the Persian, causing damage but no casualties.

=== February 25 ===
- Fierce sectarian violence erupted on February 25 despite an extraordinary daytime curfew, killing more than 24 people in a series of incidents around the country, including a brazen attack by Sunni insurgents on the funeral procession of an Iraqi television journalist Atwar Bahjat. The violence took place even though a daytime curfew emptied the streets of Baghdad and three neighboring governorates for a second day. The government extended the daylight security clampdown with a ban on cars on February 27.
- According to KarbalaNews.net and Juan Cole, Sunni insurgents blew up a Shiite shrine in Bashir, south of Tuz Khurmato. 20 insurgents attacked the shrine of Salman the Persian. They killed the guards and placed explosives at the tomb, then blew it up, damaging the shrine.

=== February 26 ===
- Five days of violence left more than 200 people dead and many Sunni mosques smashed, despite daytime curfews on Baghdad and surrounding provinces. There were further ominous signs of the "ethnic cleansing" of once mixed neighbourhoods in and around Baghdad. Scores of Shi'a families were reported to have fled homes in the restive western Sunni suburb of Abu Ghraib. Shi'a community leaders said they were being housed temporarily in schools and other buildings in Shia areas. In the latest round of attacks, a bomb destroyed a minibus as it was leaving a bus station in the Shi'a town of Hilla, 60 miles south of Baghdad, killing five people and wounding three.

== Reactions ==
=== Political ===
==== Iraq ====
Prime Minister Ibrahim al-Jaafari has urged Iraqis to stay unified and peaceful, saying the attack was an effort to incite violence. He has also called for three days of national mourning. However, talks between him and a prominent Sunni Muslim group are put on hold as the Sunni Iraqi Accord Front quits discussions on forming a new government due to the recent violence. At the same time, a government organization called the Sunni Endowments that maintains Sunni mosques and shrines condemned the attack. On February 25, al-Jaafari blamed terrorists for the crisis: "The Iraqi people have one enemy; it is terrorism and only terrorism. ... There are no Sunnis against Shiites or Shiites against Sunnis."

Despite the Sunni boycott, President Jalal Talabani pressed ahead with a meeting that he had called to avert a descent toward a civil war. After discussions with Shiites, Kurds and leaders of a smaller Sunni group, he warned about the danger of all-out war.

The government is extending a curfew it imposed in parts of the country on Friday to calm tensions sparked by an attack on a Shia shrine.

Iraqi defence minister Saadoun al-Dulaimi warned about the danger of a long civil war. Also, he said that Iraq would not hesitate to dispatch tanks to the streets to end violence and impose security. The minister also denied any involvement by what he called Interior Ministry commandos in the attack that targeted Harith Sulayman al-Dari, leader of the Association of Muslim Scholars.

Sunni and Shiite clerics in Iraq have agreed to prohibit killings and to ban attacks on each other's mosques in an effort to ease sectarian violence.

==== United States ====
U.S. President George W. Bush warned about the threat of civil war and expressed support for the Iraqi government. On February 25, Bush called seven Iraqi political leaders in an extraordinary round of telephone diplomacy aimed at getting talks restarted about forming a permanent government. On February 28, Bush decried the latest surge in sectarian violence and said that for Iraqis "the choice is chaos or unity". In congressional testimony, National Intelligence Director John Negroponte said a civil war in Iraq could lead to a broader conflict in the Middle East, pitting the region's Sunni and Shiite powers against one another.

Zalmay Khalilzad, Washington's ambassador to Iraq, and the top US commander in the country, Gen. George Casey, issued a joint statement saying the US would contribute to the shrine's reconstruction.

==== United Kingdom ====
UK Foreign Secretary Jack Straw called the bombing a "criminal and sacrilegious act", urging Iraqis to show restraint and avoid retaliation.

=== Religious ===
==== Iraq ====
Grand Ayatollah Ali al-Sistani sent instructions to his followers forbidding attacks on Sunni mosques, especially the major ones in Baghdad, and calling for seven days of mourning. He hinted that religious militias could be given a bigger security role if the government was incapable of protecting holy shrines. On February 25 Sistani called for Iraq's powerful tribes to be deployed to protect the country's holy places after three attacks on Shia shrines in four days: "Ayatollah Sistani, who received a tribal delegation from Kufa, asked that the Iraqi tribes reclaim their role of protecting the shrines," said an official in Sistani's office in the Shia clerical center of Najaf. ... After the crimes against the places of worship, including the blowing up of the mausoleum in Samarra and the attacks against the tombs of Salman the Persian and Imam Ali bin Mussa al-Rida, the tribes must take a stand and claim a role in the protection of these sites."

Shiite cleric Muqtada al-Sadr condemned the attack and called for calm. Having called to stop mutual attacks, Sadr ordered members of his militia to protect Sunni mosques in majority Shia areas in southern Iraq. Sadr called for Iraqi unity and warned against "a plan by the occupation to spark a sectarian war". He called on Sunni groups such as the Association of Muslim Scholars to form a joint panel and ordered his militia to defend Shiite holy sites across Iraq.

On February 25 Sunni and Shiite clerics agreed to prohibit killing members of the two sects and banning attacks on each other's mosques in an effort to ease tension between Iraq's Muslim communities following sectarian violence after the bombing of a Shi'ite shrine. The agreement was made during a meeting between representatives of Sadr and Shiite cleric Jawad al-Khalisi and members of the influential Sunni Association of Muslim Scholars at the Abu Hanifa Mosque, a Sunni place of worship.

According to Juan Cole, three Iraqi clerics all employed their influence and authority among the Shiite rank and file to make the Samarra bombing work for them politically. Sistani expanded his militia and stayed at the forefront of the movement by encouraging peaceful rallies. Abdul Aziz al-Hakim used the explosion in Samarra to bolster his own authority. He remonstrated with the American ambassador, saying it was not reasonable to expect the religious Shiites, who won the largest bloc of seats in parliament, to give up their claim on the ministry of interior, and that, indeed, Khalilzad had helped provoke the troubles with his assertions to that effect earlier. Muqtada al-Sadr used the incident to push for a U.S. withdrawal from Iraq, something he has wanted since the fall of Saddam.

==== Iran ====
Grand Ayatollah and Supreme Leader of Iran Ali Khamenei, urged Shi'ites not to take revenge on Sunni Muslims for the attack on the Samarra shrine and deflected blame to the United States and Israel.

==== India ====
Syed Ali Nasir Saeed Abaqati, a leading Shia cleric from Lucknow, India, held al-Qaeda responsible for the destruction of the Al-Askari Mosque in Samarra, Iraq.

== Analysis ==
=== Academia ===
"I think this is probably the most dangerous event that has occurred since the fall of Saddam Hussein," former CIA Middle East specialist Reuel Marc Gerecht told CNN. "It risks our entire enterprise in Iraq."

"We may be on the verge of taking communal violence to the next level," warned Juan Cole, professor of Middle-Eastern history at the University of Michigan, who called Wednesday "an apocalyptic day in Iraq".

"It's very clear that the Shiites are interpreting this chain of events as evidence that the Americans are weak and can't protect Shiite interests," said Cole. "And now Americans are having to come back to the Shiites and ask them to be magnanimous and give away a lot of what they've won in elections."

"It was always going to be a very hard sell, but now it's an impossible argument; Shiites aren't going to give away any power at all at this point," he said, adding that "it's possible that there could be a hung parliament, the government would collapse, and you'd have to go to new elections. And that would be a disaster in the present circumstances."

William F. Buckley, Jr. considered the bombing as an indication of a general failure of the US policy in Iraq.

=== 2010 Iraq War documents leak ===
The October 2010 Iraq War documents leak shed new light on the events of February–March 2006. In particular, the logs reveal that U.S. soldiers immediately reported an "explosion of retaliatory killings, kidnappings, tortures, mosque attacks, and open street fighting", even as U.S. commanders including Defense Secretary Donald Rumsfeld were downplaying media reports of a surge in killings. The previous "official" death toll for post-bombing sectarian fighting, of 3–400, was based on information from the Shiite-led government and the Sadr-run Health Ministry, which was directly involved in atrocities according to the logs. According to The Washington Post reporter Ellen Knickmeyer, her contemporary report of 1,300+ casualties, dismissed at the time as an outlier, was in fact an undercount; the actual deaths, she says, exceeded 3,000.
