= Al-Askari Shrine =

10th-century Shia mosque and mausoleum in Iraq

Al-'Askarī Shrine
- العتبة العسكرية
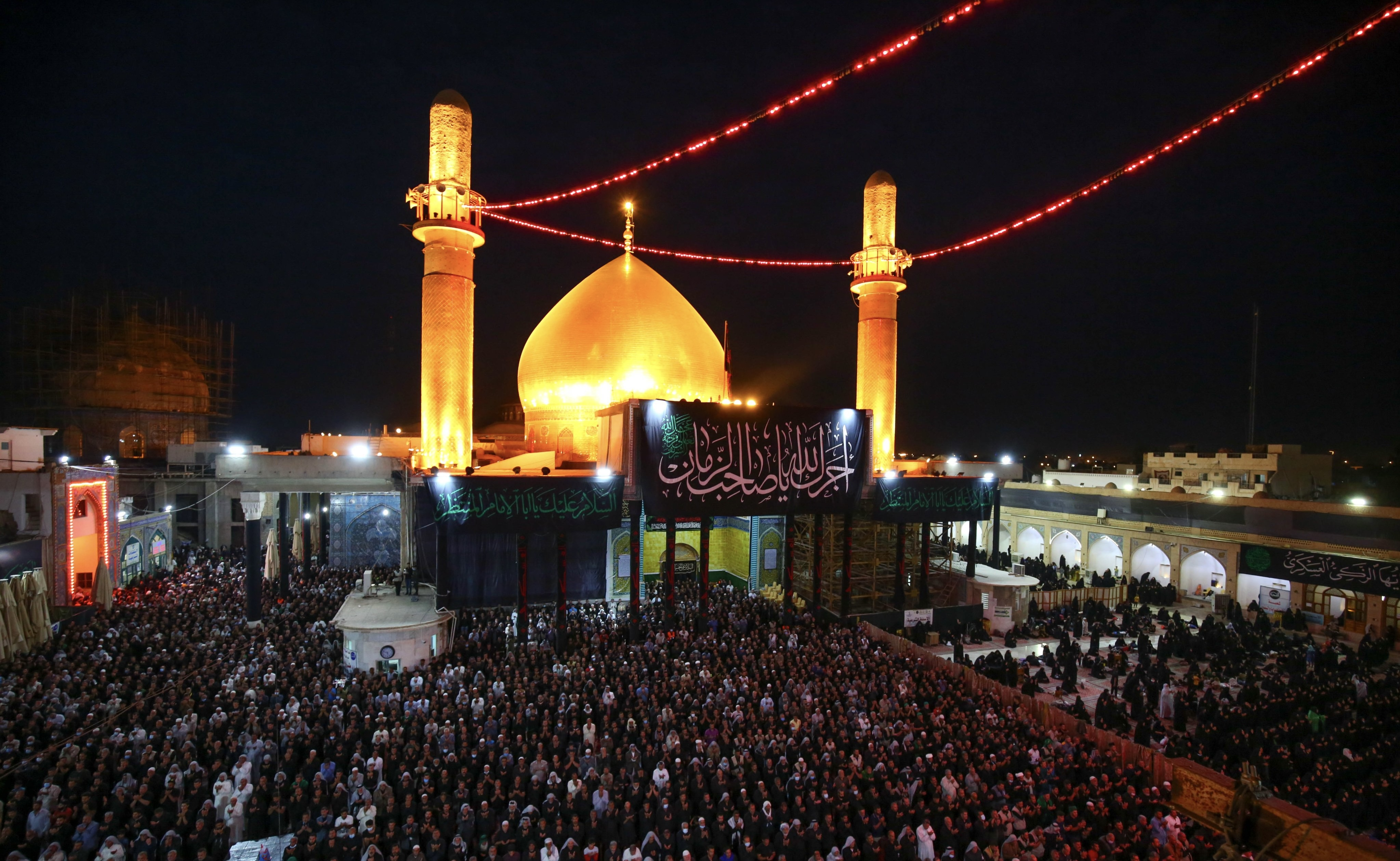
- The mosque and shrine in 2021

- Location of the mosque and shrine in Iraq

Religion
- Affiliation: Shia Islam
- Ecclesiastical or organisational status: Shrine
- Status: Active

Location
- Location: Samarra, Saladin Governorate
- Country: Iraq
- Interactive map of Al-'Askarī Shrine
- Coordinates: 34°11′56″N 43°52′25″E

Architecture
- Type: Shi’i mosque
- Style: Islamic architecture
- Completed: 944 CE; 1868 (remodelled); 1905 (dome added); 2009 (restoration)
- Destroyed: February 2006 (partial); June 2007 (partial)

Specifications
- Dome: One
- Dome height (outer): 68 m (223 ft)
- Dome dia. (outer): 20 m (66 ft)
- Minaret: Two
- Minaret height: 36 m (118 ft)
- Spire: One: (destroyed)
- Shrines: Three: 'Alī al-Hādī; Ḥasan al-'Askarī; and others
- Materials: Gold pieces; ceramic tiles

UNESCO World Heritage Site
- Official name: Samarra Archaeological City
- Criteria: Cultural: ii, iii, iv
- Reference: 276
- Inscription: 2007 (31st Session)
- Endangered: 2007-
- Area: 15,058 ha (37,210 acres)
- Buffer zone: 31,414 ha (77,630 acres)

The Al-Askari Shrine (Arabic: العتبة العسكرية), also known as the 'Askariyya Shrine and the Al-Askari Mosque, is the mausoleums of the tenth and eleventh Shia Imams, Ali al-Hadi and Ḥasan al- Askari, located in Samarra, in the Saladin Governorate of Iraq. It is a holy site in Shia Islam.

Housed in the mosque are also the tombs of Ḥakīma Khātūn, sister of Imam Hadi; and Narjis Khātūn, the mother of Imam Mahdi. Adjacent to the mosque is another domed commemorative building, built over the cistern where the Twelfth Imam, the Mahdi, first entered the Minor Occultation or "hidden from the view"—whence the other title of the Mahdi, the Hidden Imam.

== History ==
The Imams 'Alī al-Hādī ("an-Naqī") and Haṣan al-'Askarī lived under house arrest in the part of Samarra that had been Caliph al-Mu'tasim's military camp ('Askar al-Mu‘tasim, hence an inmate of the camp was called an 'Askarī). As a result, they are known as the 'Askariyyayn. They died and were buried in their house on Abī Ahmad Street near the mosque built by Mu'tasim. A later tradition attributes their deaths to poison.

Nasir ad-Din Shah Qajar undertook the latest remodelling of the shrine in 1868, with the golden dome added in 1905. Covered in 72,000 gold pieces and surrounded by walls of light blue tiles, the dome was a dominant feature of the Samarra skyline. It was approximately 20 metres (66 ft) in diameter by 68 metres (223 ft) high.

=== 2006 attack ===
On 22 February 2006, at 6:55 am local time (03:55 UTC) explosions occurred at the shrine, effectively destroying its golden dome and severely damaging the shrine. Several men belonging to Iraqi insurgent groups affiliated with Al-Qaeda, one wearing a military uniform, had earlier entered the mosque, tied up the guards there and set explosives, resulting in the blast. Two bombs were set off by five to seven men dressed as personnel of the Iraqi Special Forces who entered the shrine during the morning.

Time magazine reported at the time of the 2006 bombing that:

al-Askari [is] one of Shi'ite Islam's holiest sites, exceeded in veneration only by the shrines of Najaf and Karbala. Even Samarra's Sunnis hold al-Askari in high esteem. The expression 'to swear by the shrine' is routinely used by both communities".

=== 2007 attack ===
At around 8 am on 13 June 2007, operatives belonging to al-Qaeda in Iraq destroyed the two remaining 36-metre-high (118 ft) golden minarets flanking the dome's ruins. No fatalities were reported. Iraqi police reported hearing "two nearly simultaneous explosions coming from inside the mosque compound at around 8 am". A report from state-run Iraqiya Television stated that "local officials said that two mortar rounds were fired at the two minarets".

=== Reopening ===
In late 2007, the Iraqi government conducted a contract with a Turkish company to rebuild the shrine. The Iraqi government later cancelled the contract due to delays by the Turkish company. As of April 2009, the golden dome and the minarets were restored and the shrine reopened to visitors.

== Notable burials ==
Among the famous people buried in this place are:

- Imam Ali al-Hadi – the 10th Shia Imam
- Imam Hasan al-Askari – the 11th Shia Imam
- Hakima Khatun – daughter of the 9th Shia Imam
- Narjis – wife of the 11th Shia Imam
- Husayn ibn Ali al-Hadi

== Gallery ==
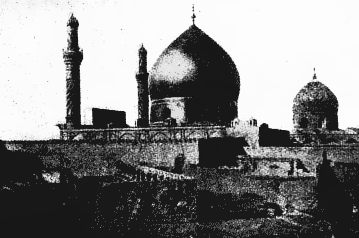

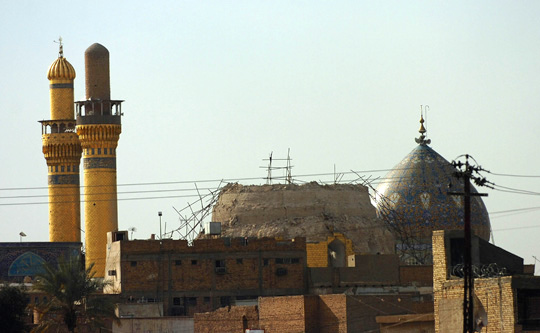

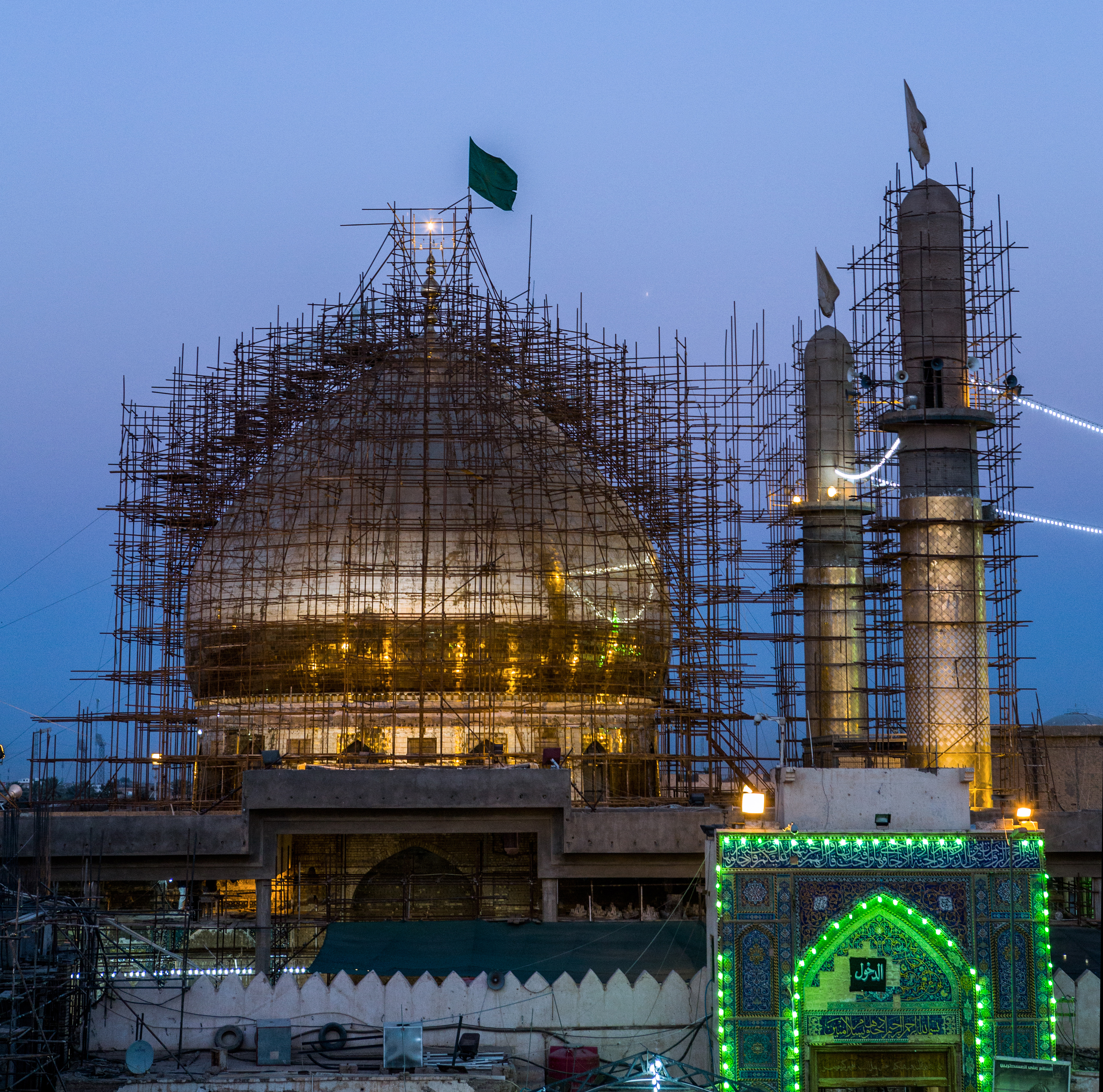

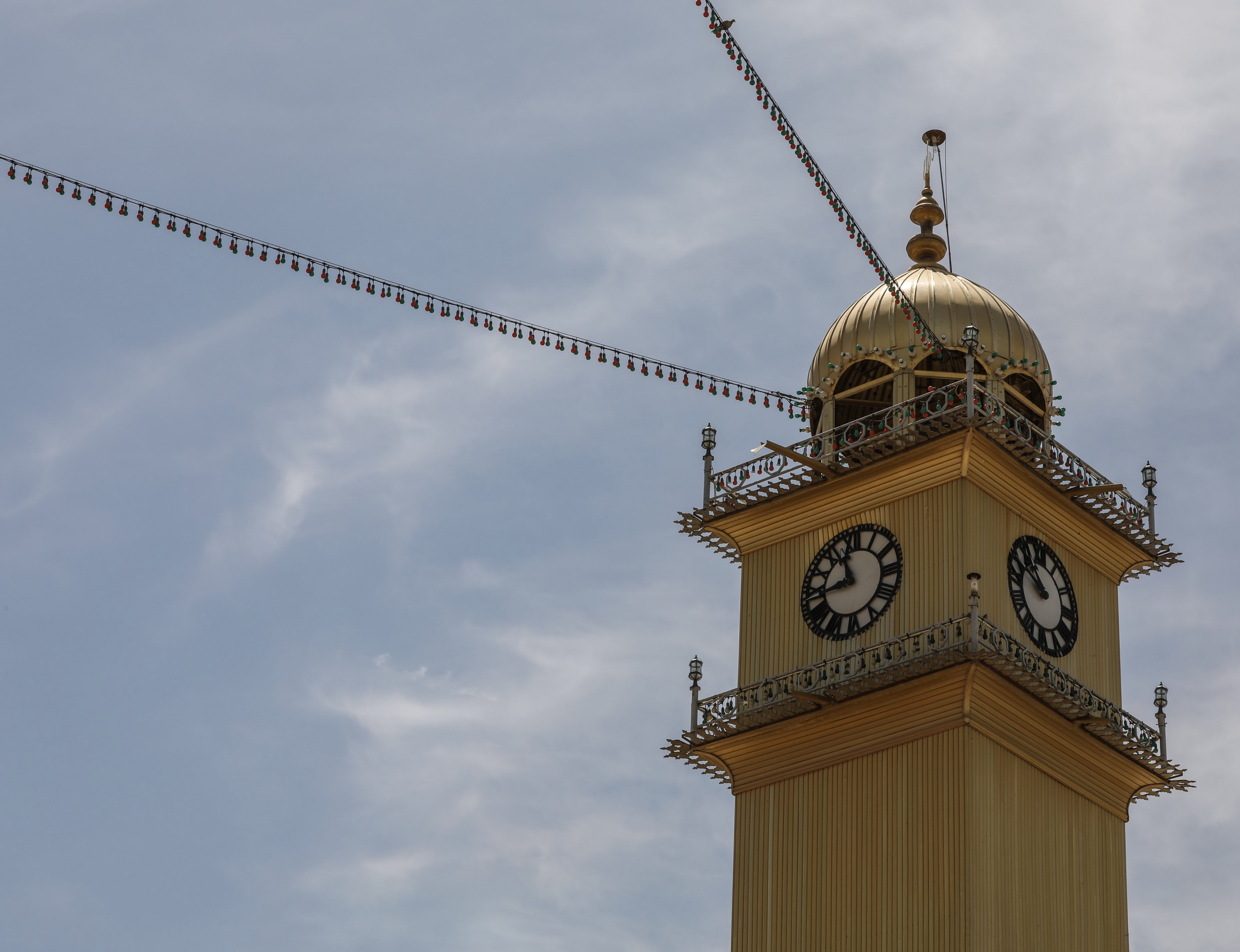

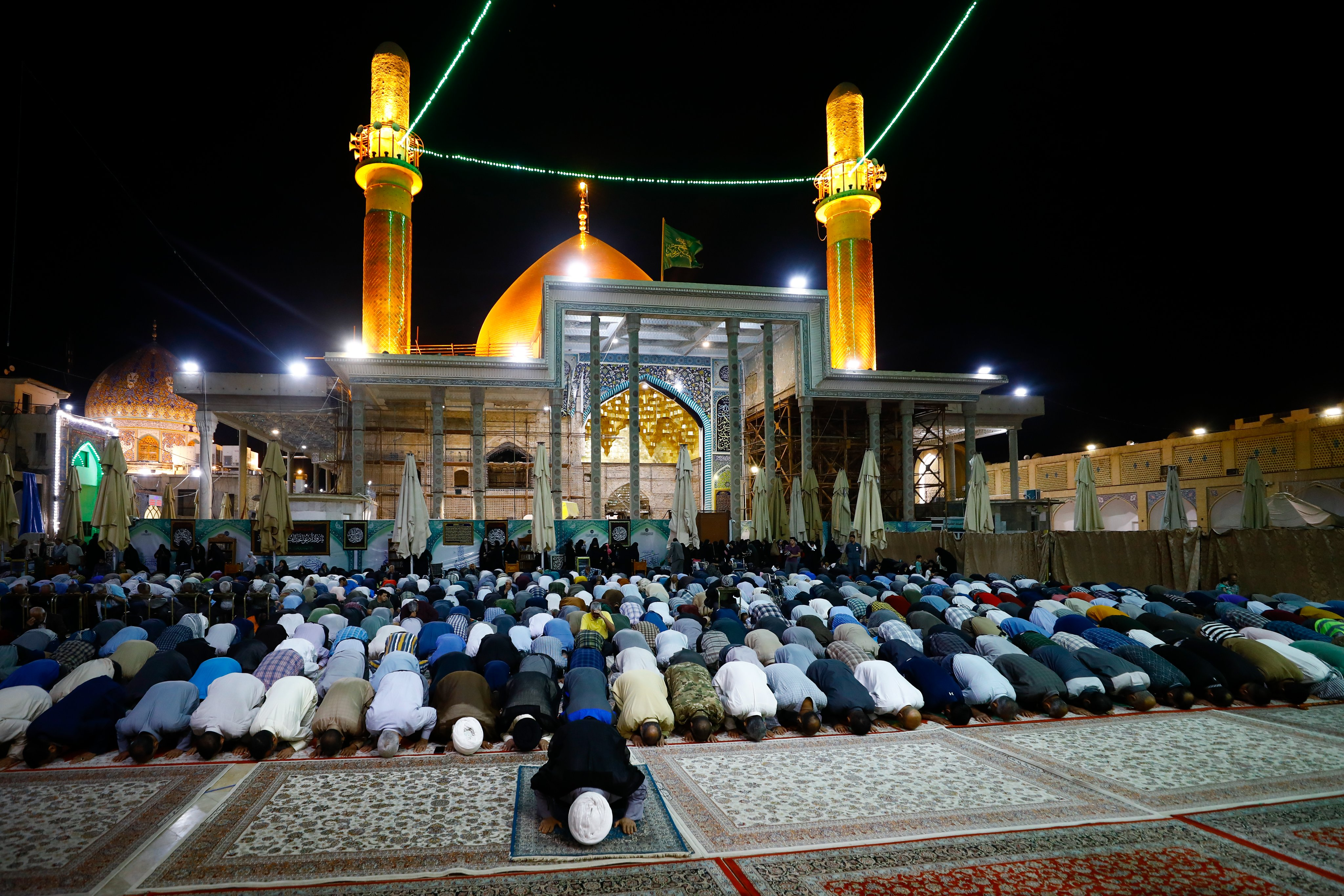

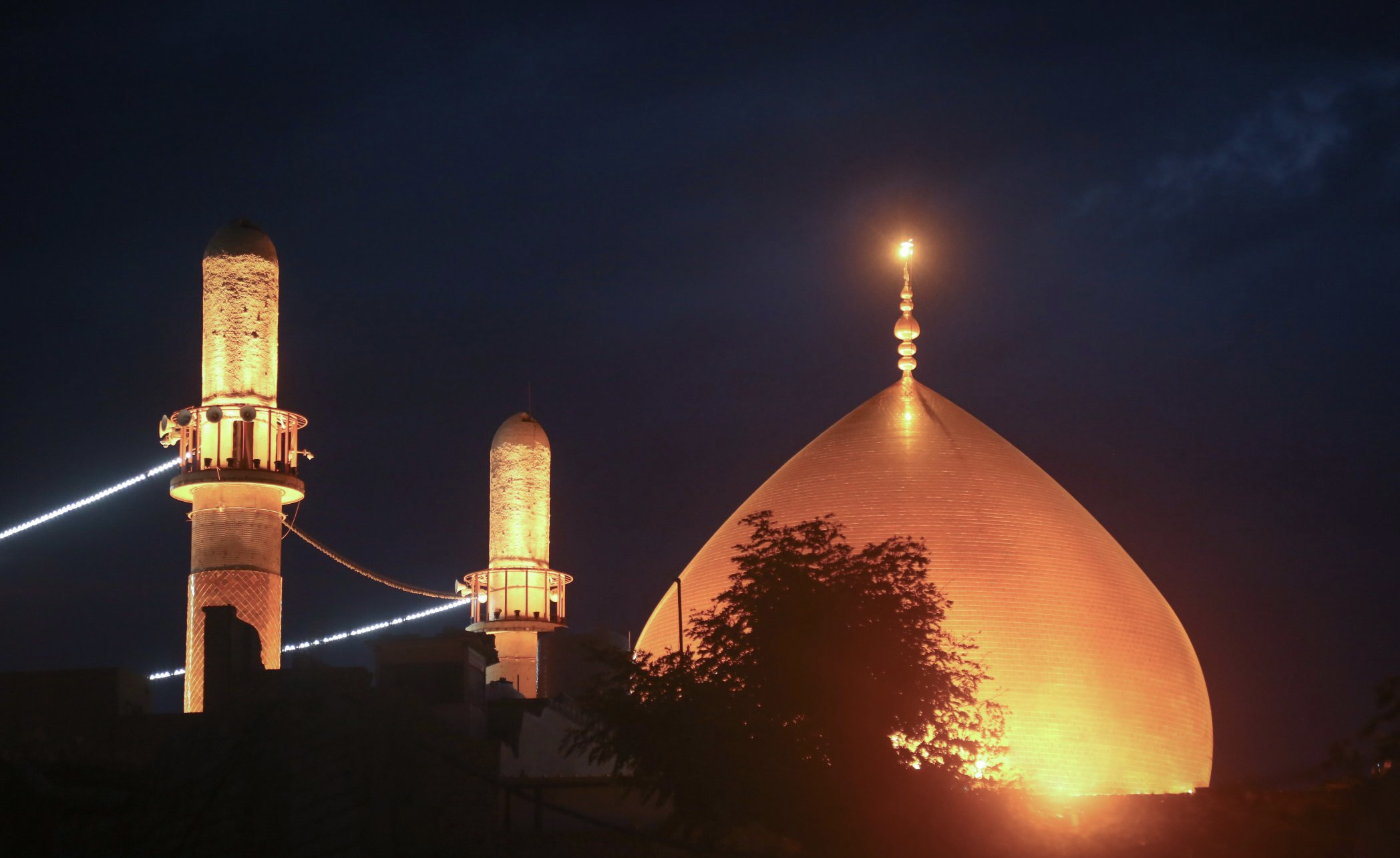

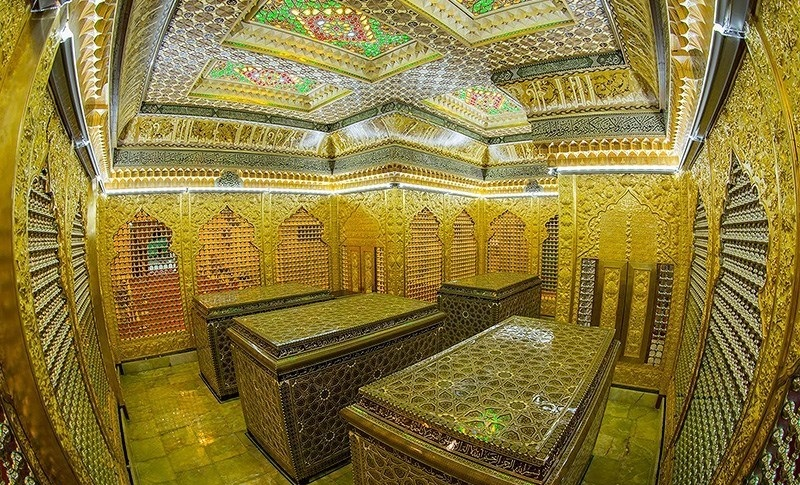

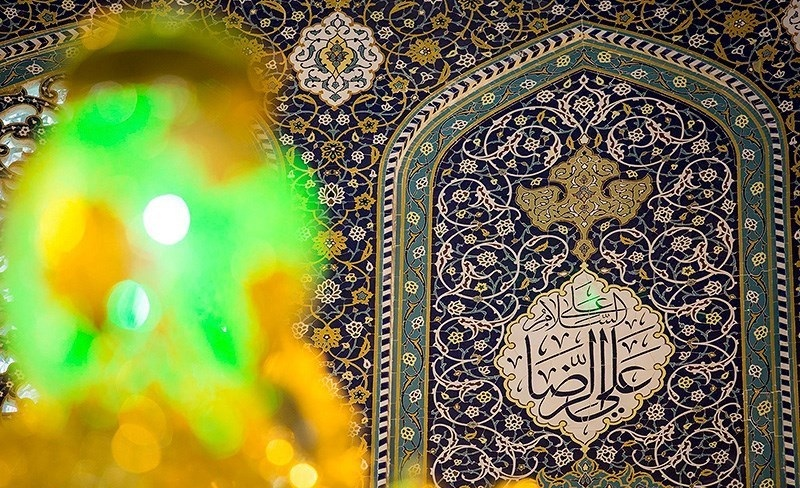

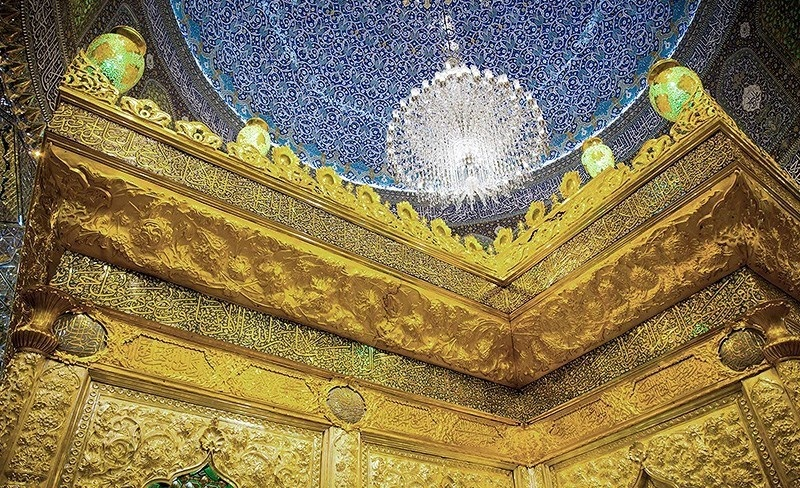

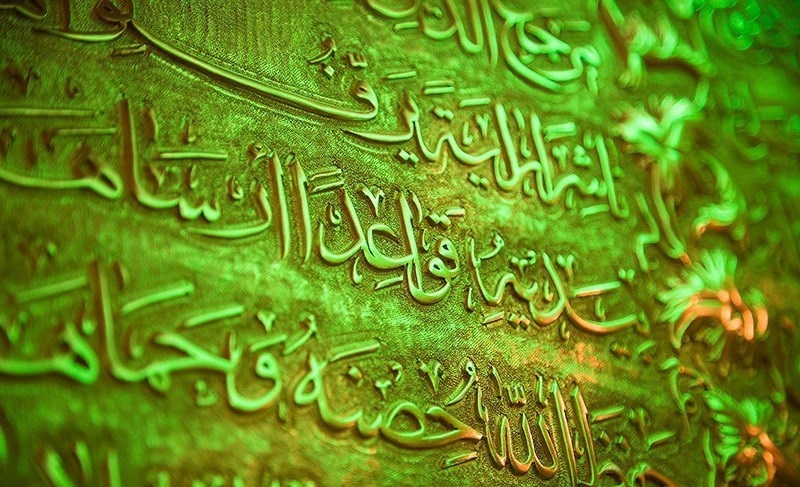

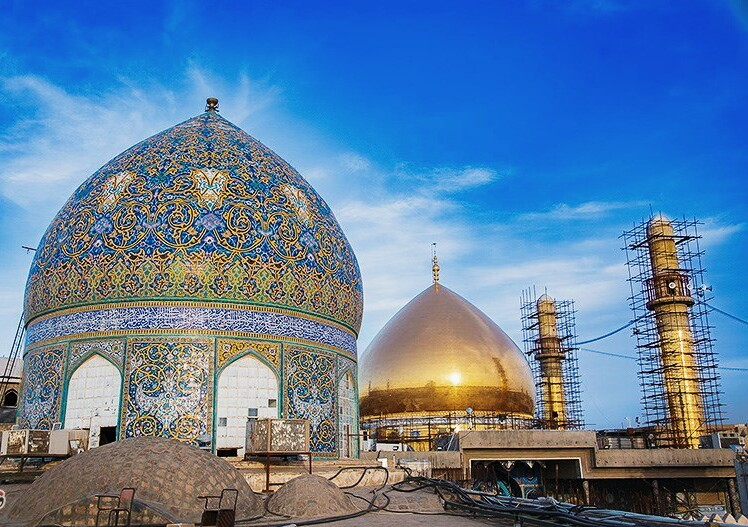

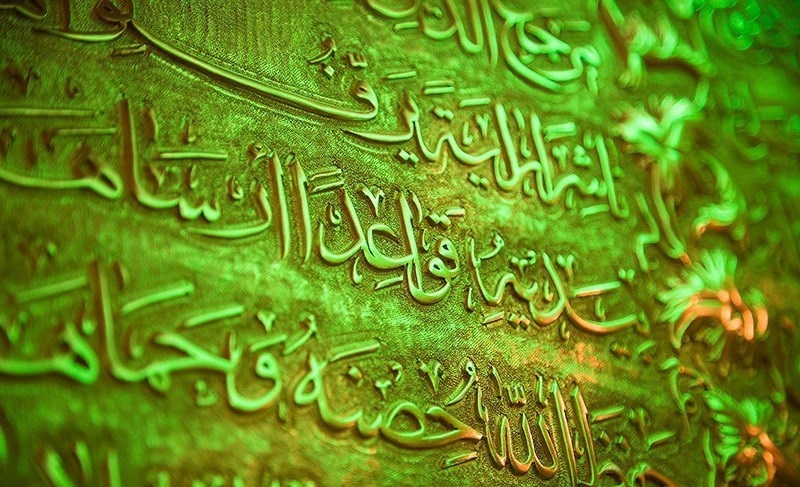

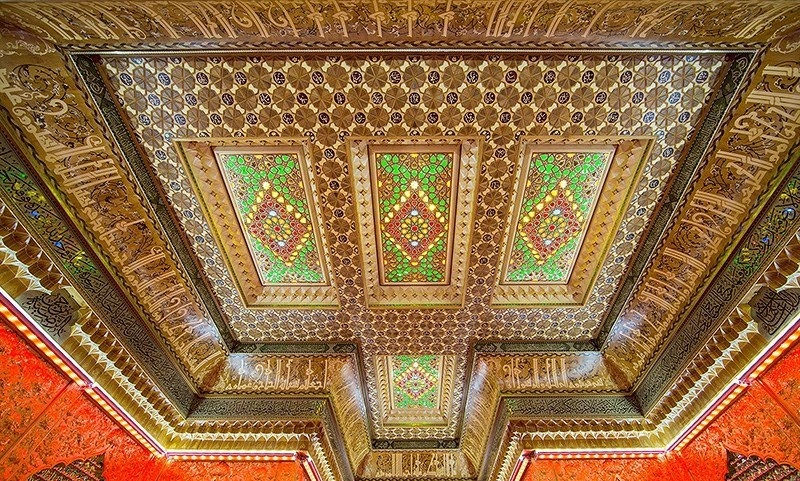

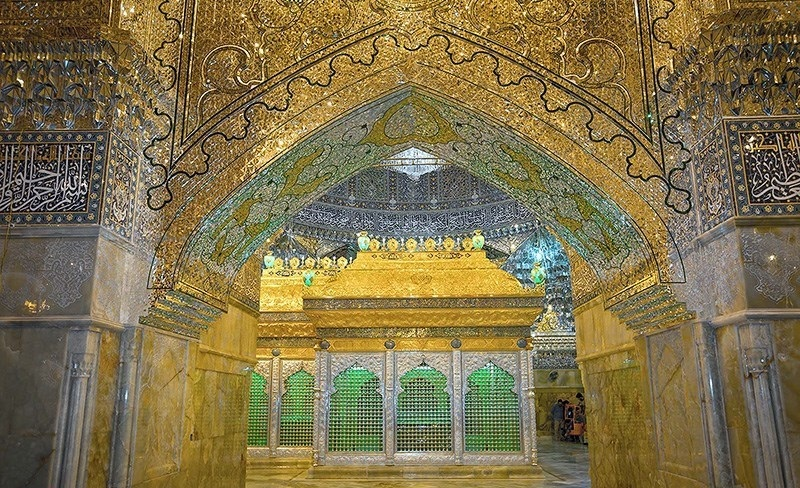

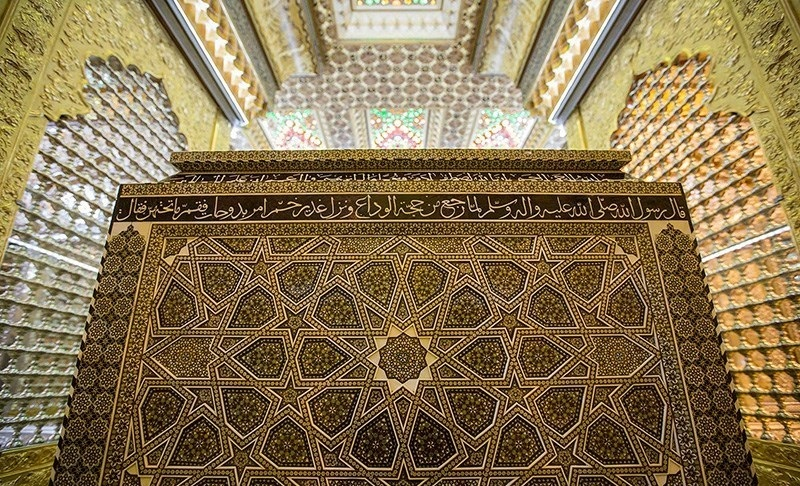

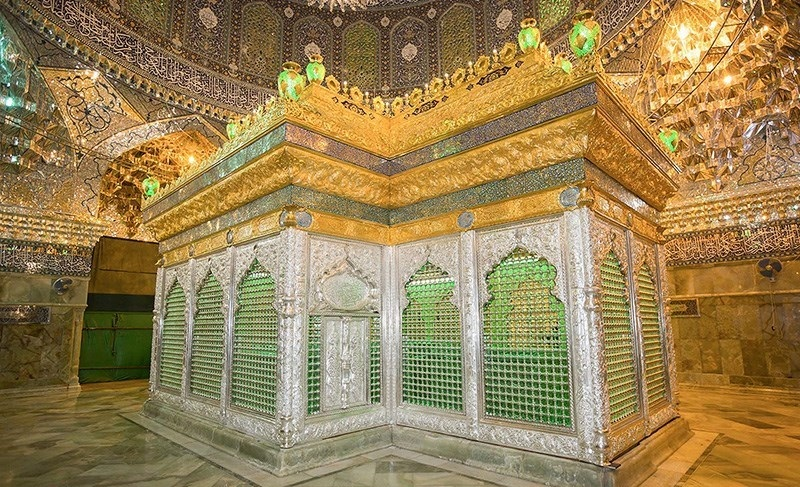

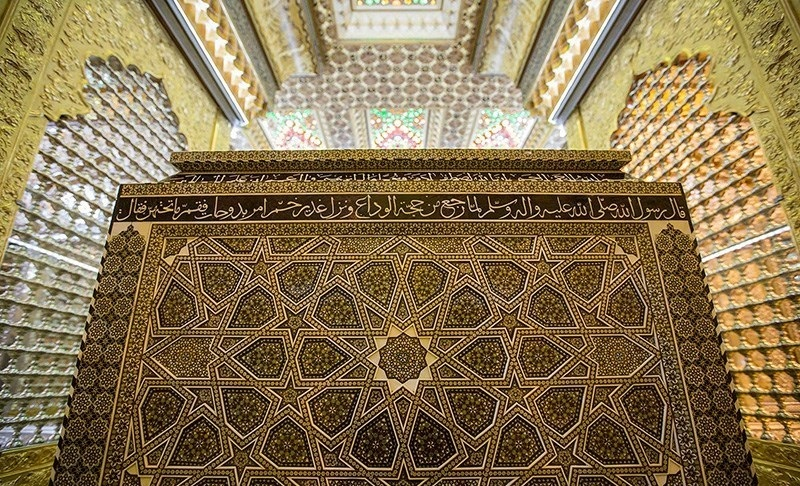

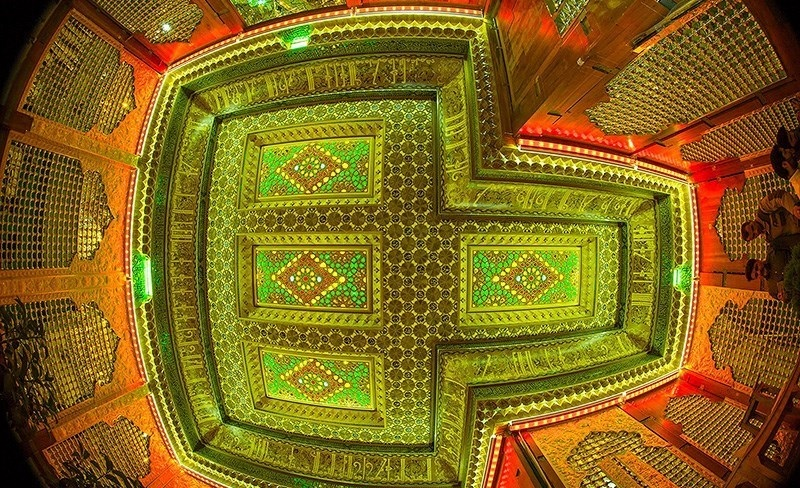

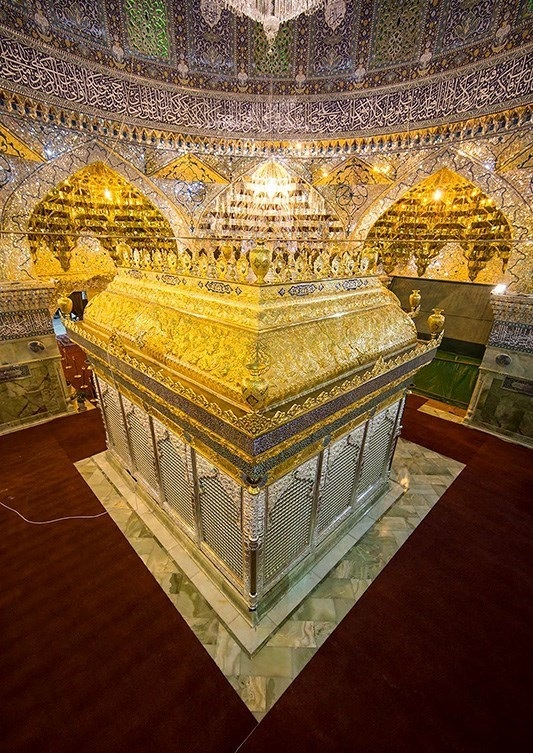

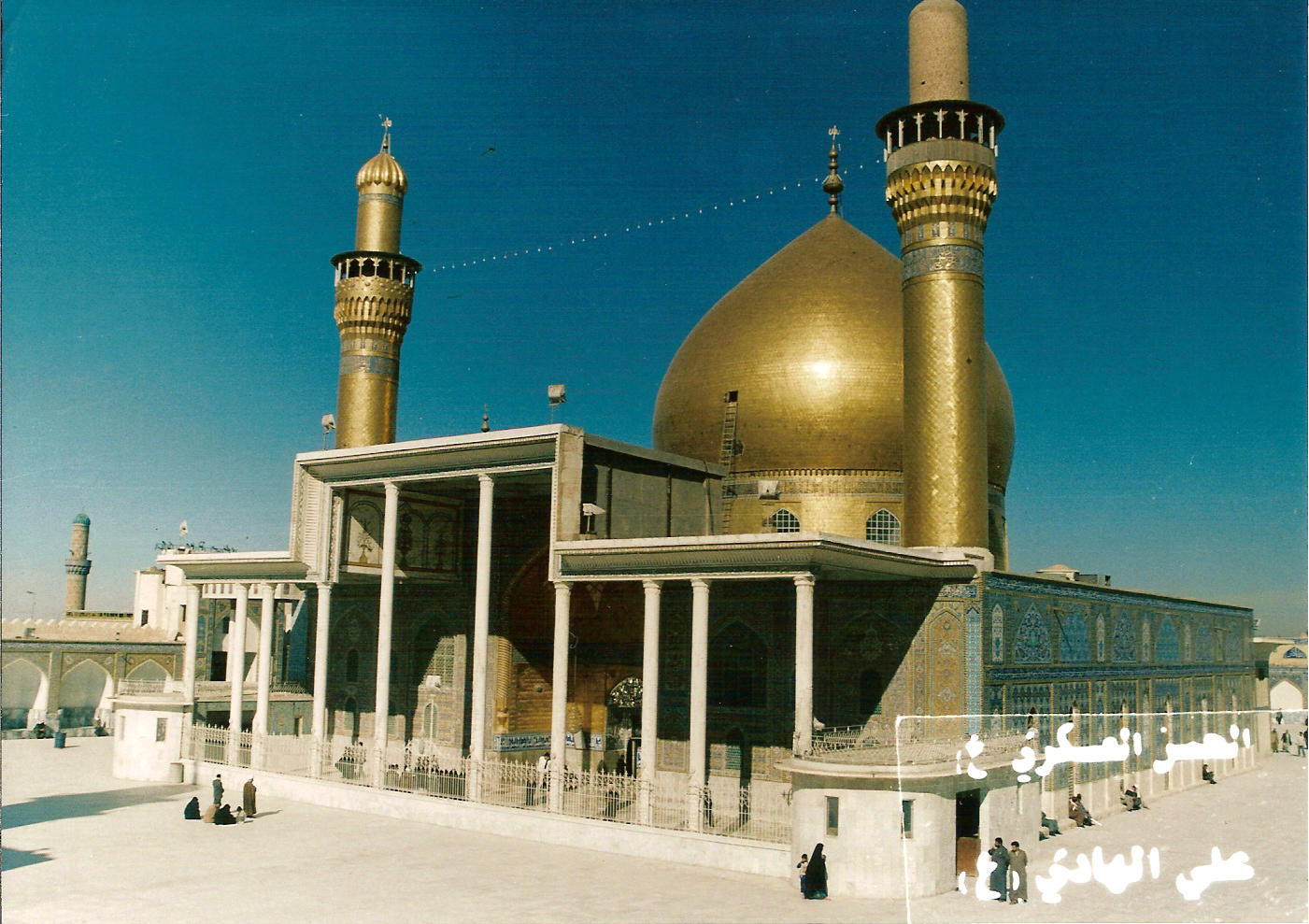

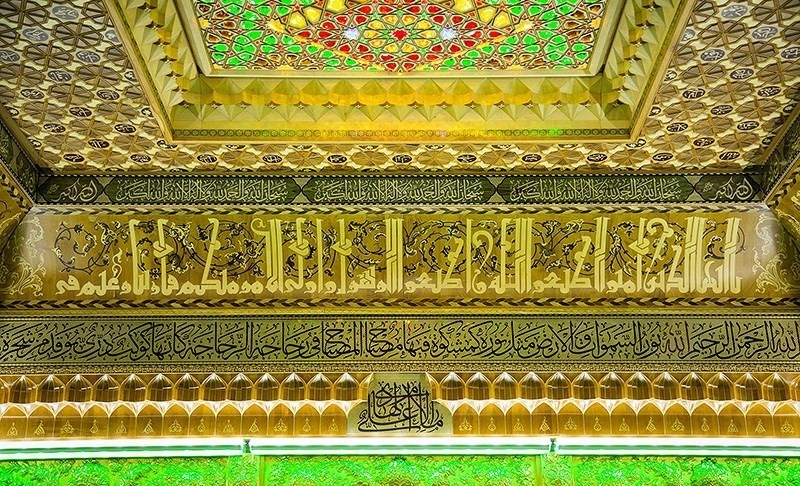

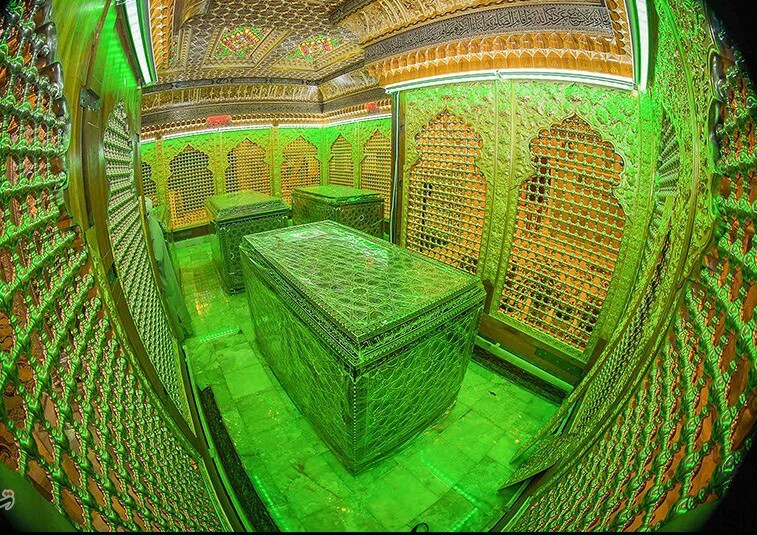

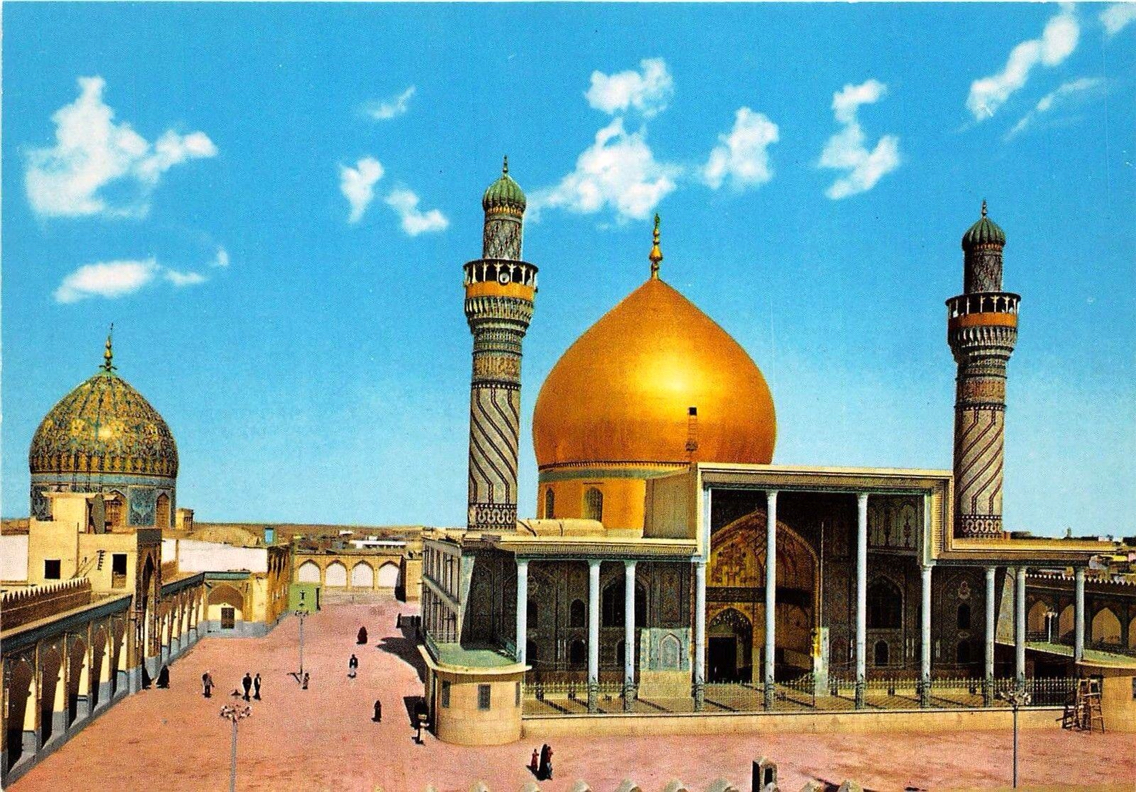

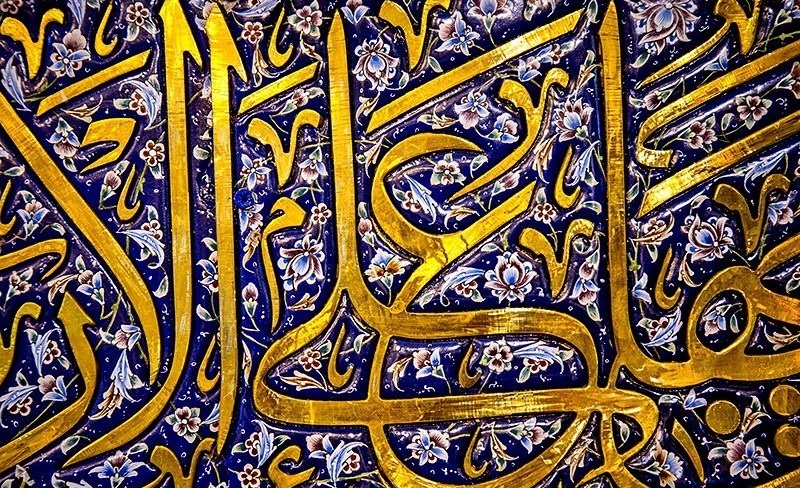

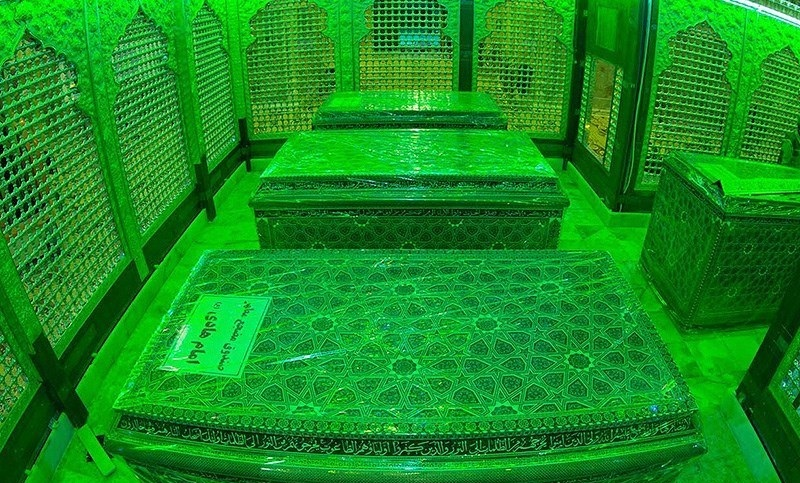

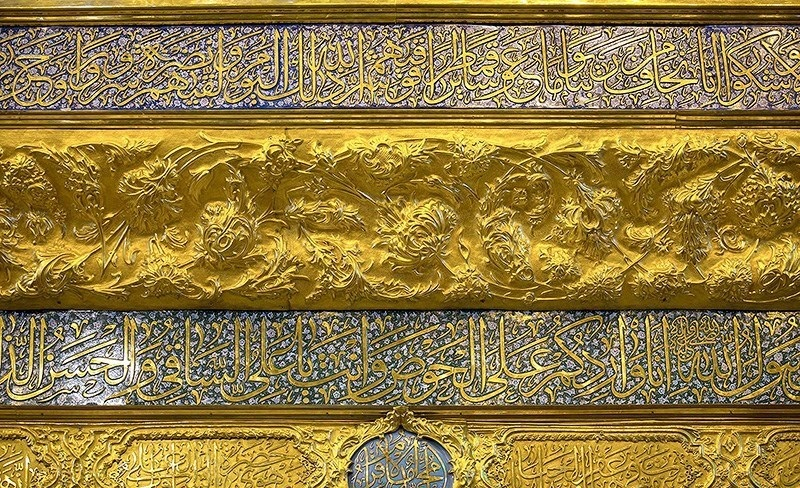

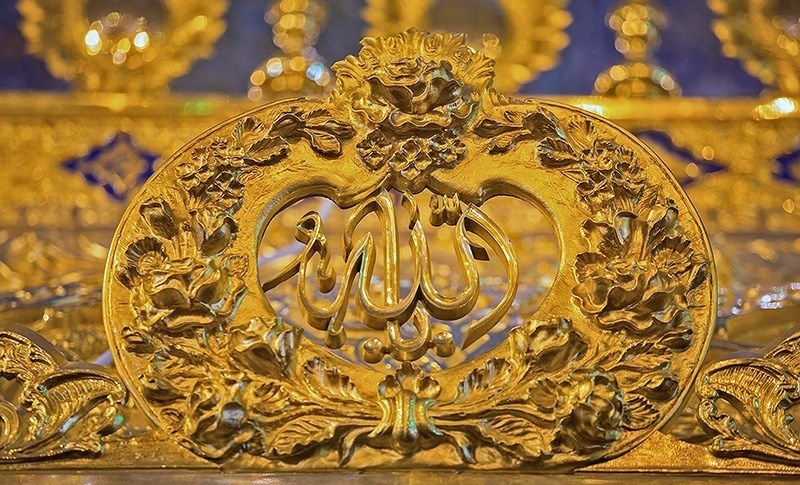

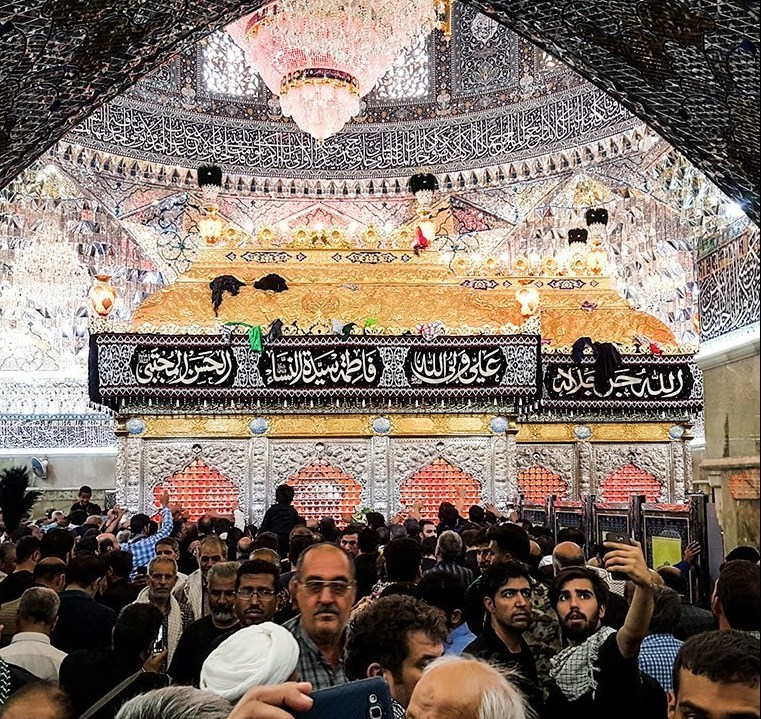

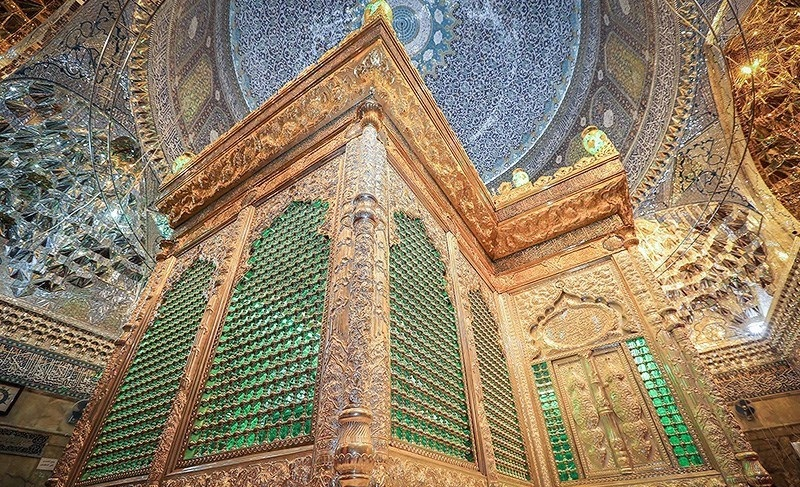

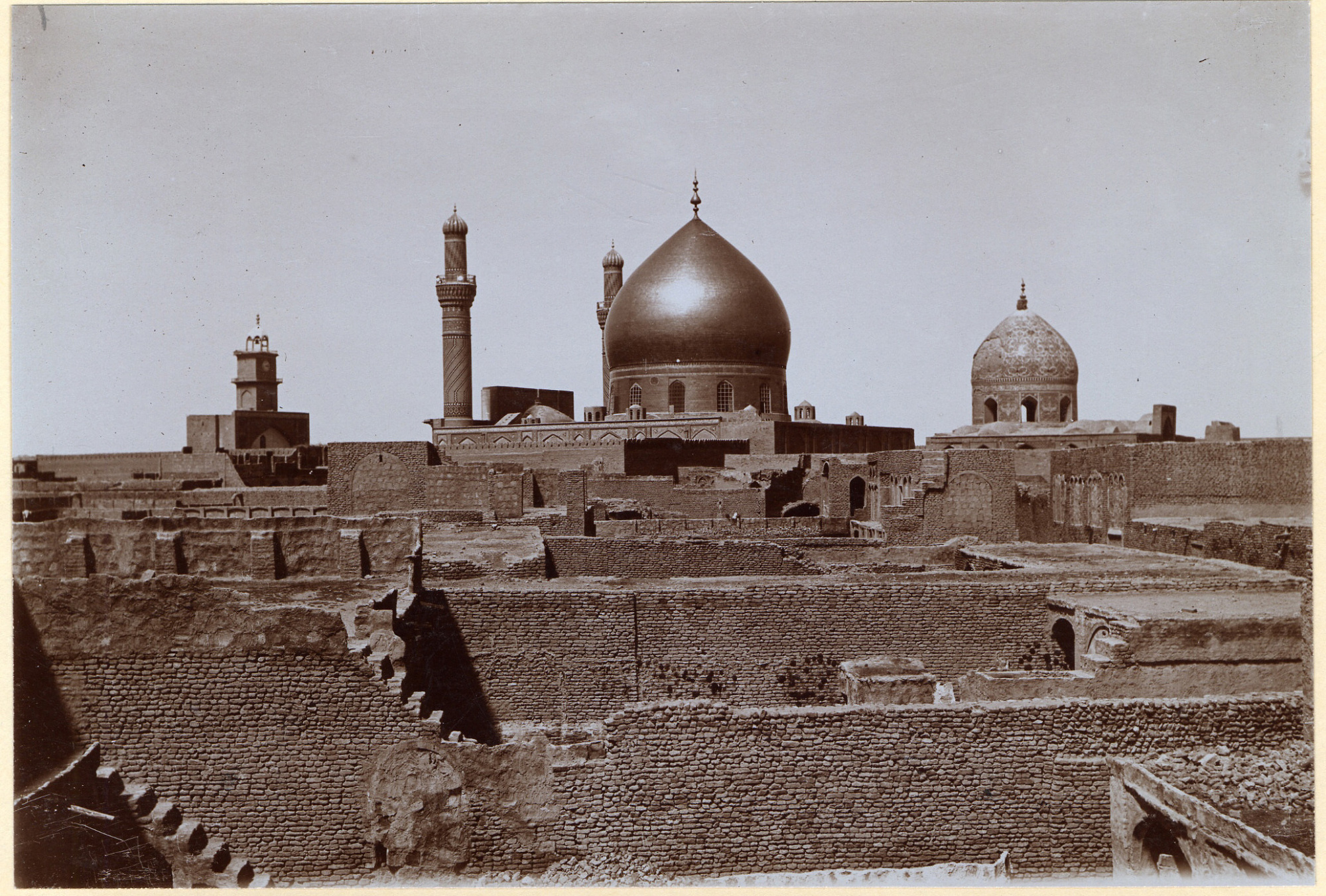

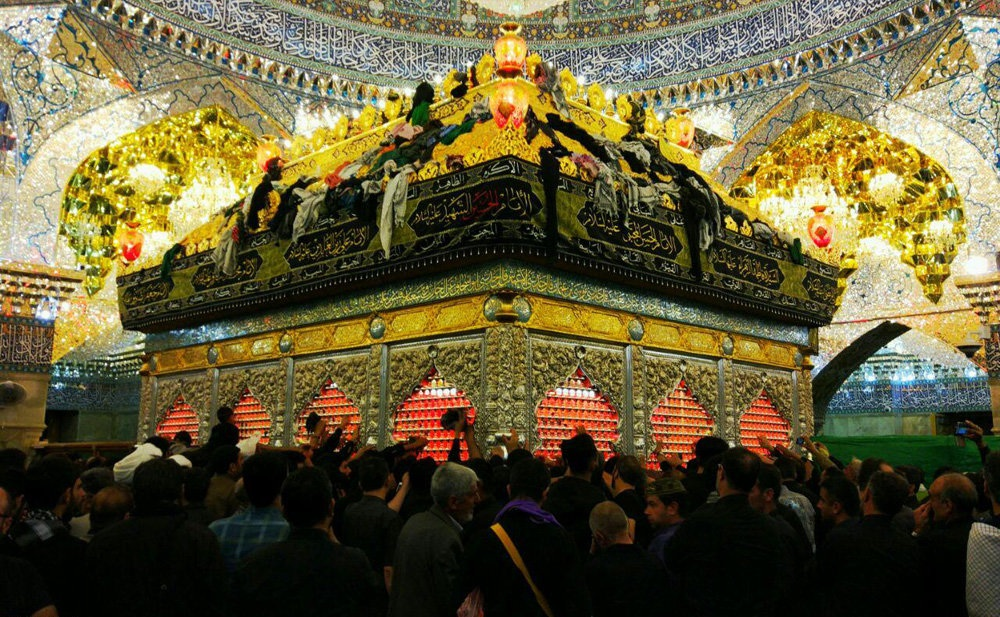

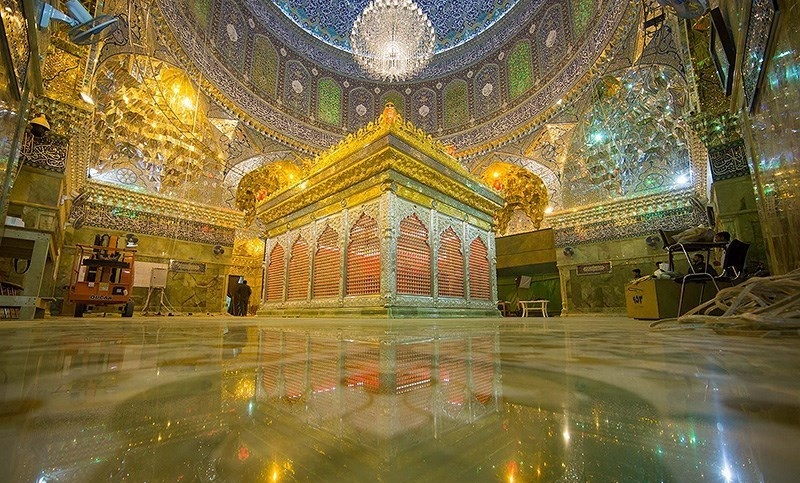

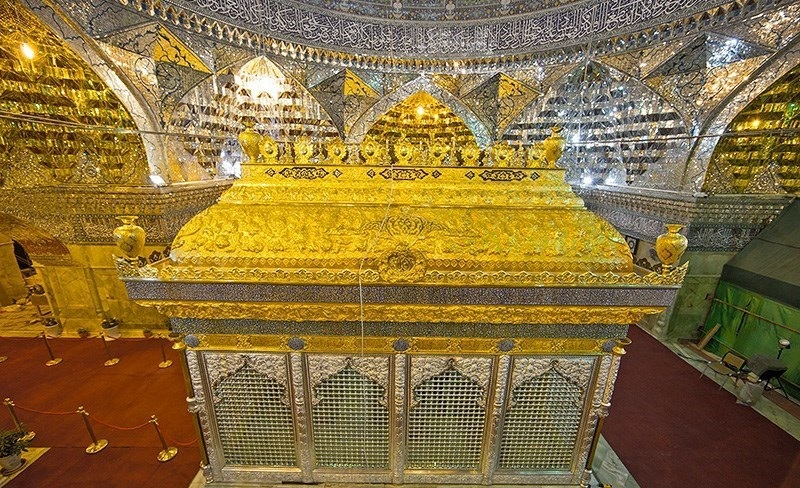

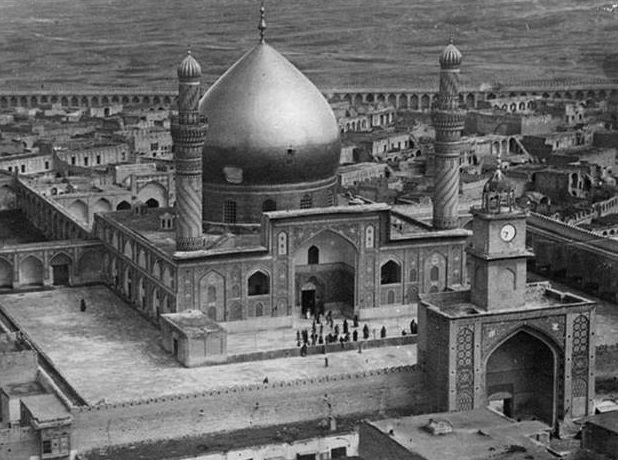

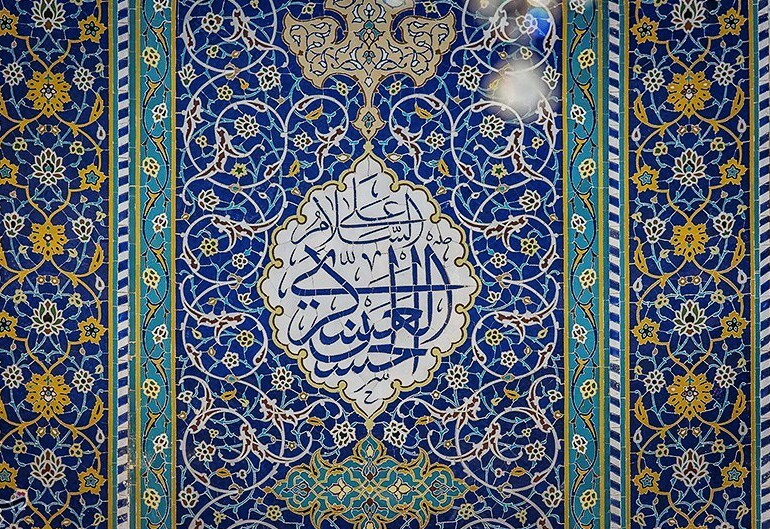

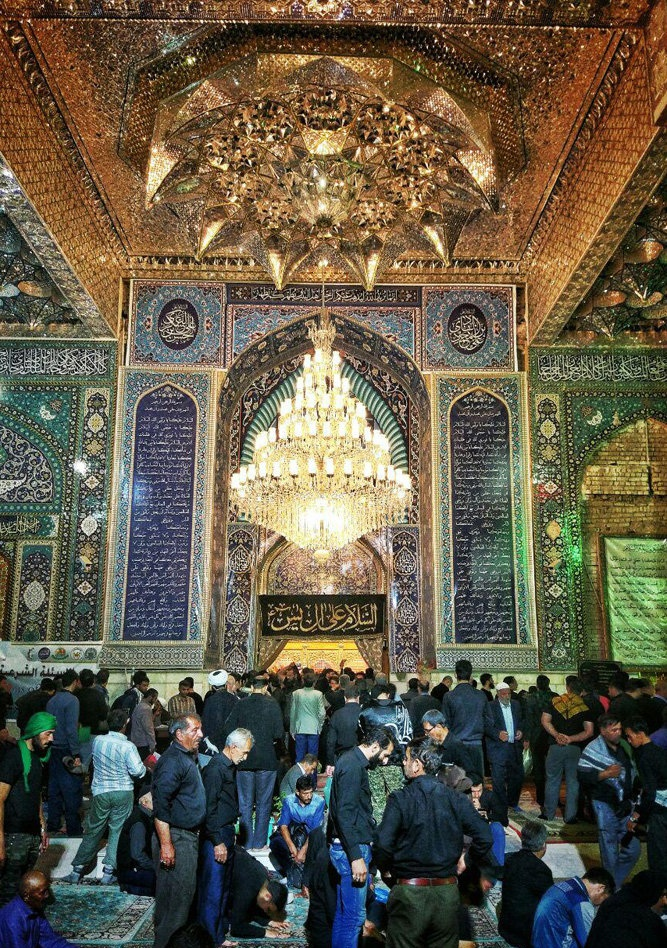

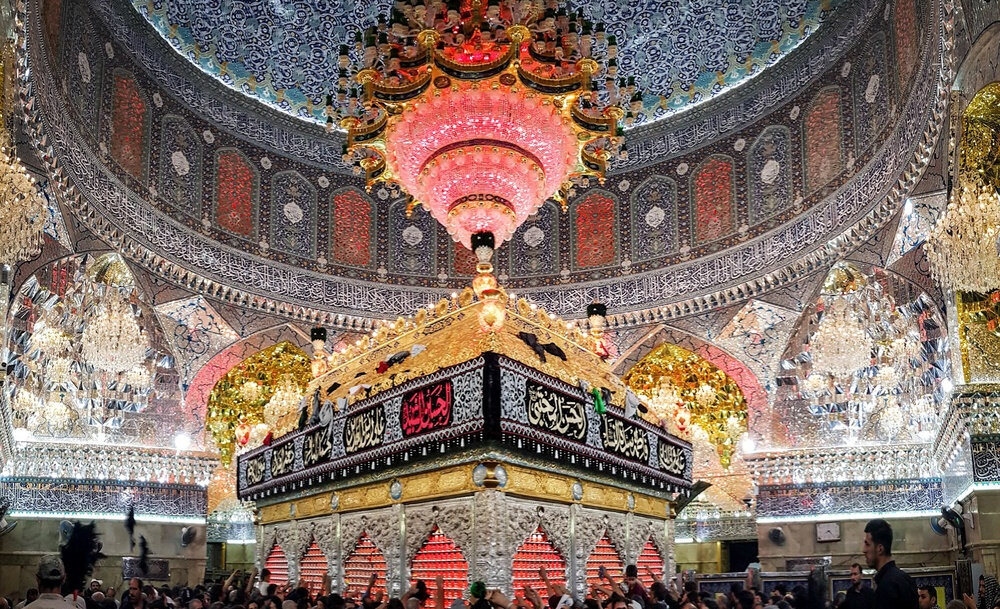

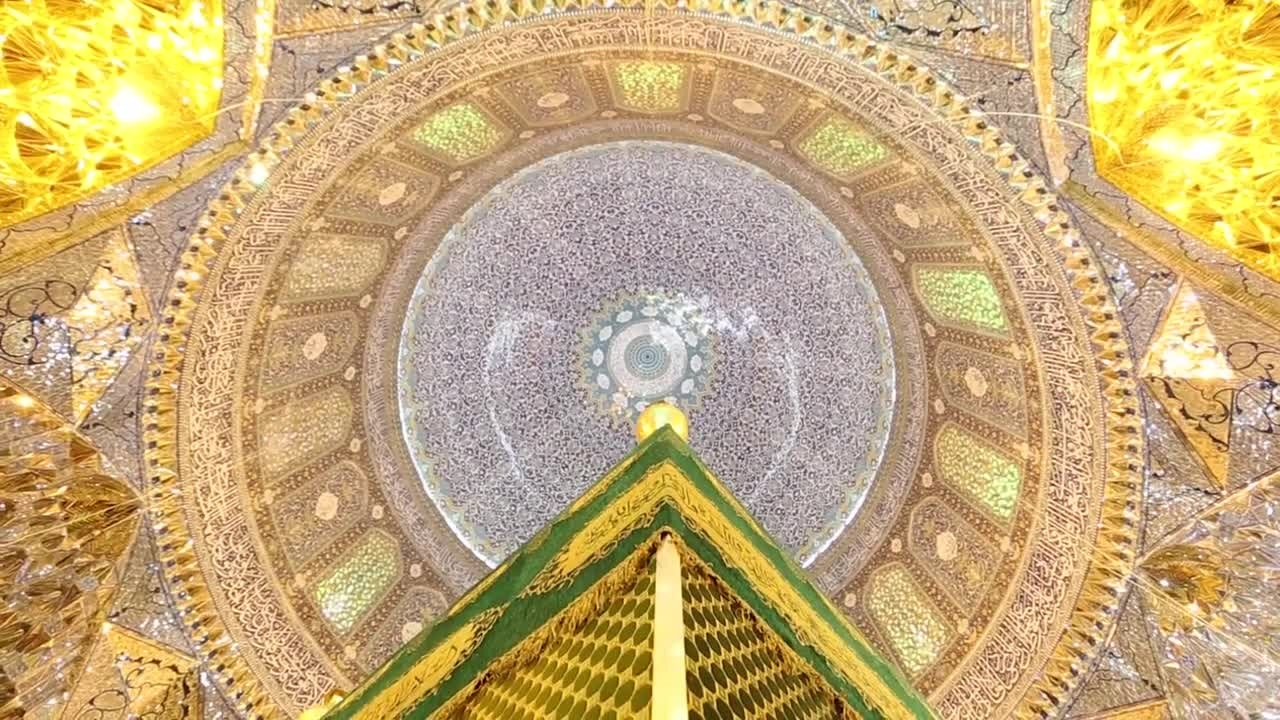

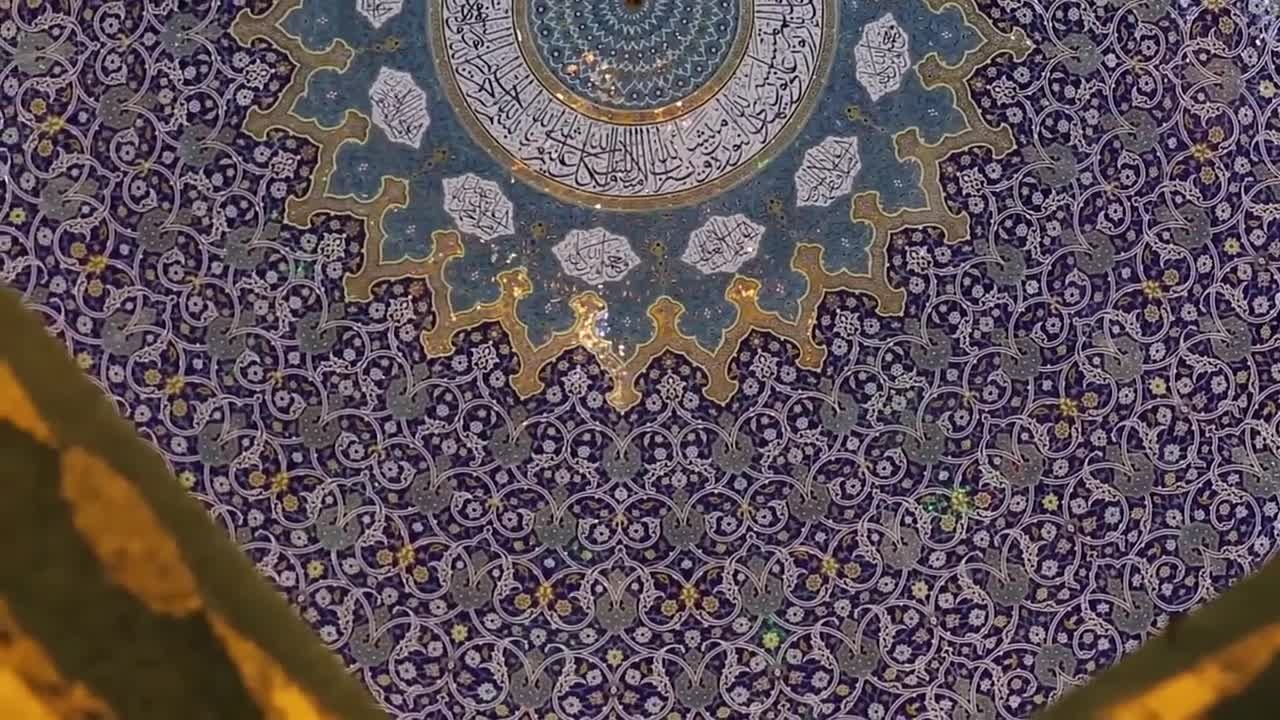

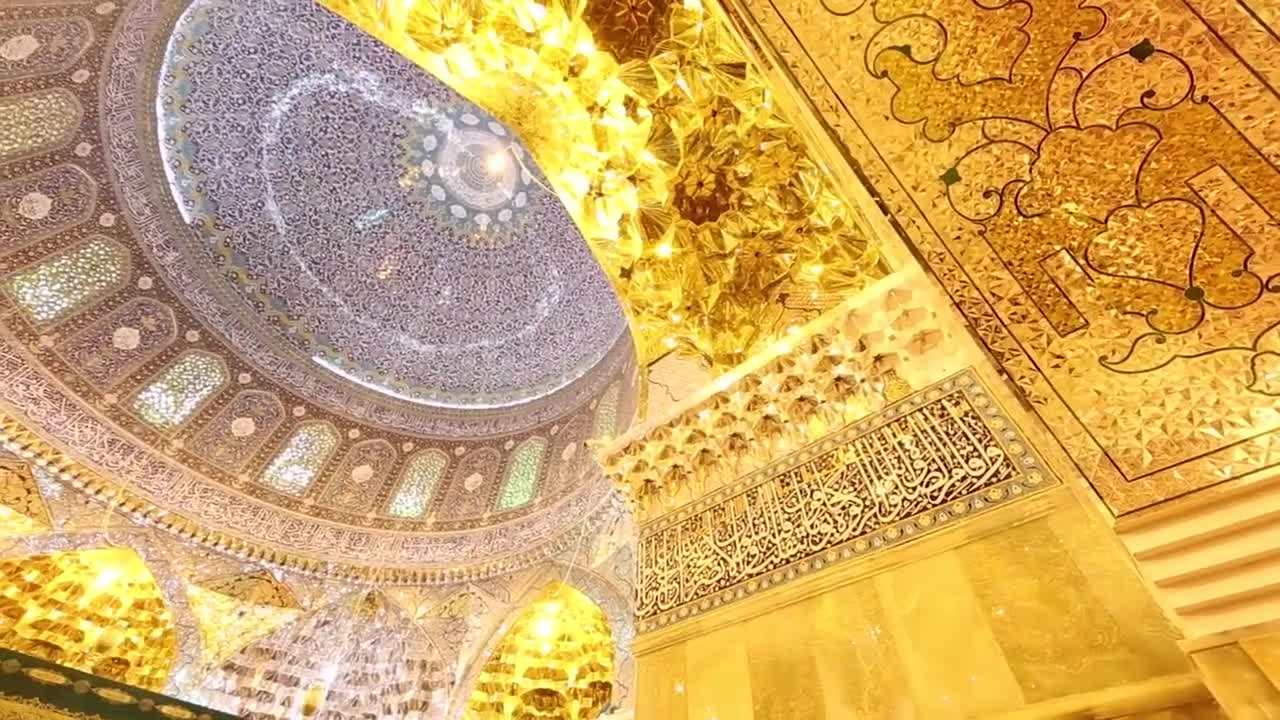

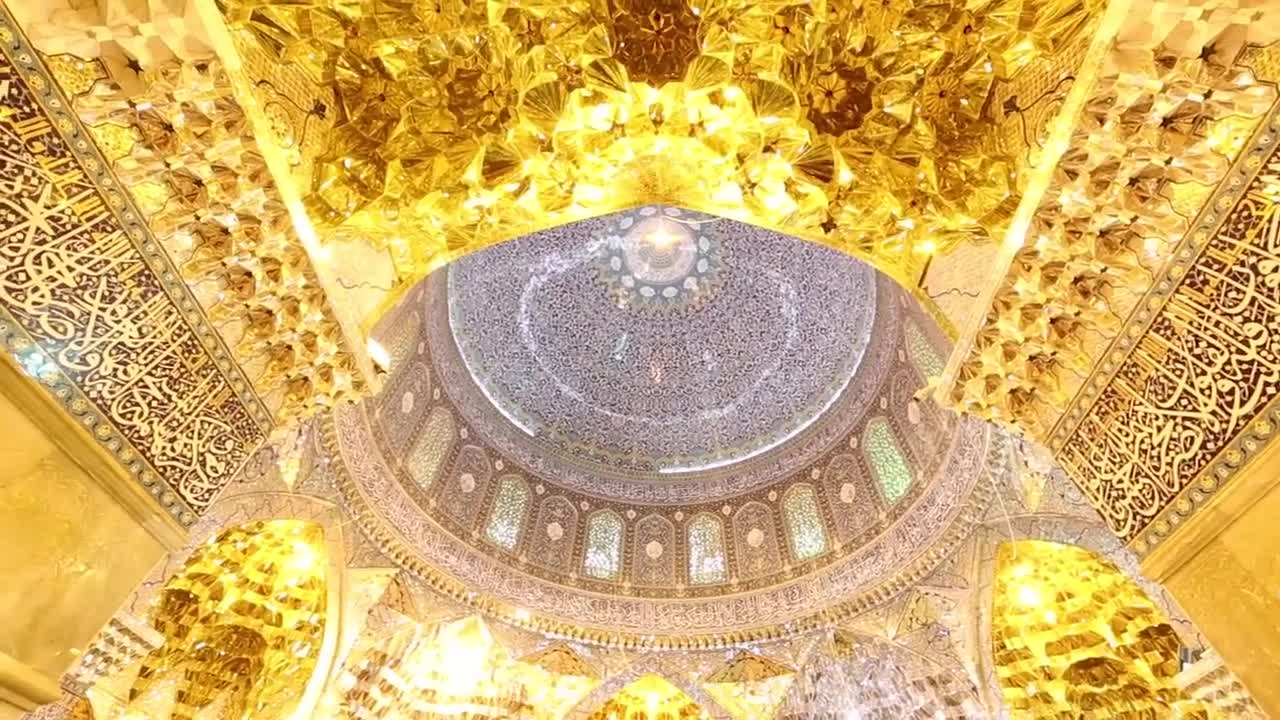

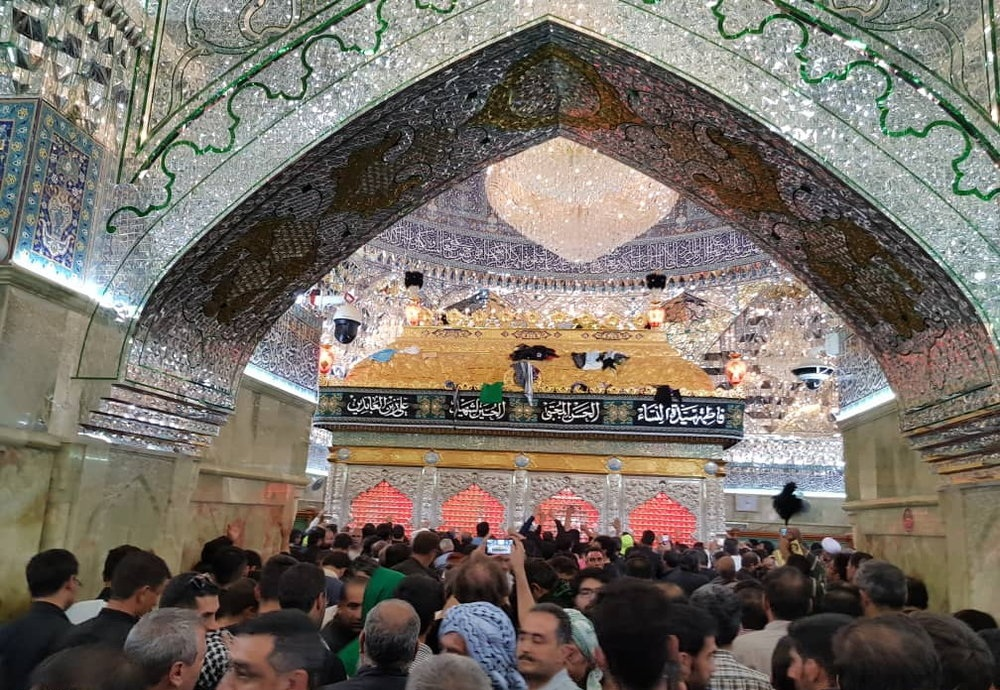

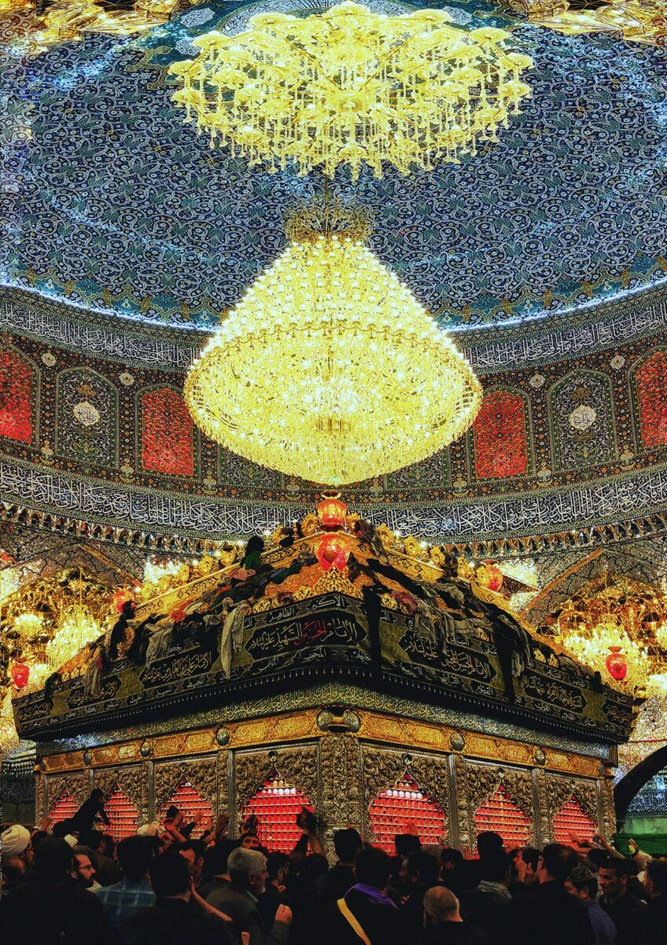

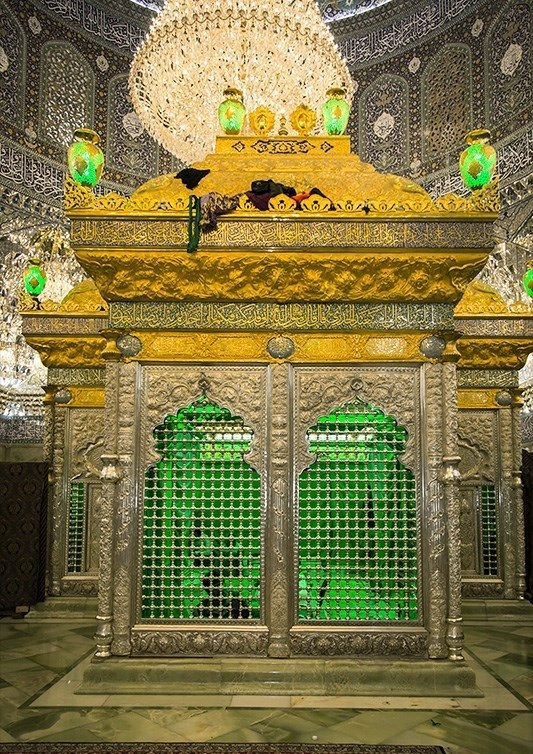

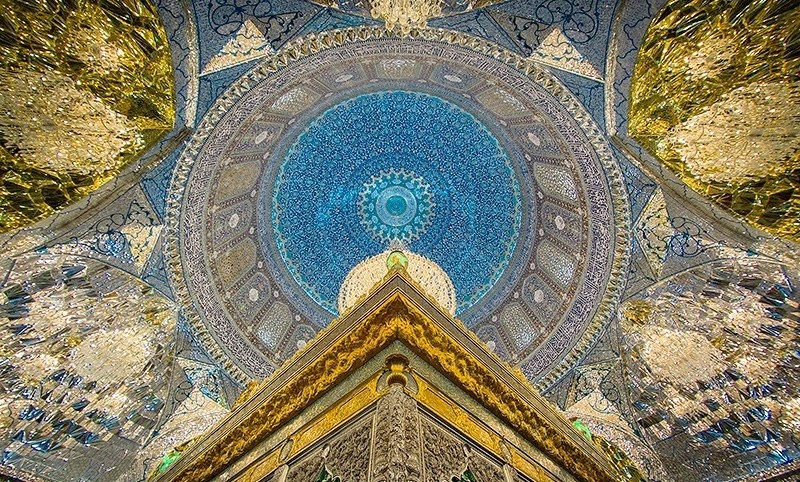

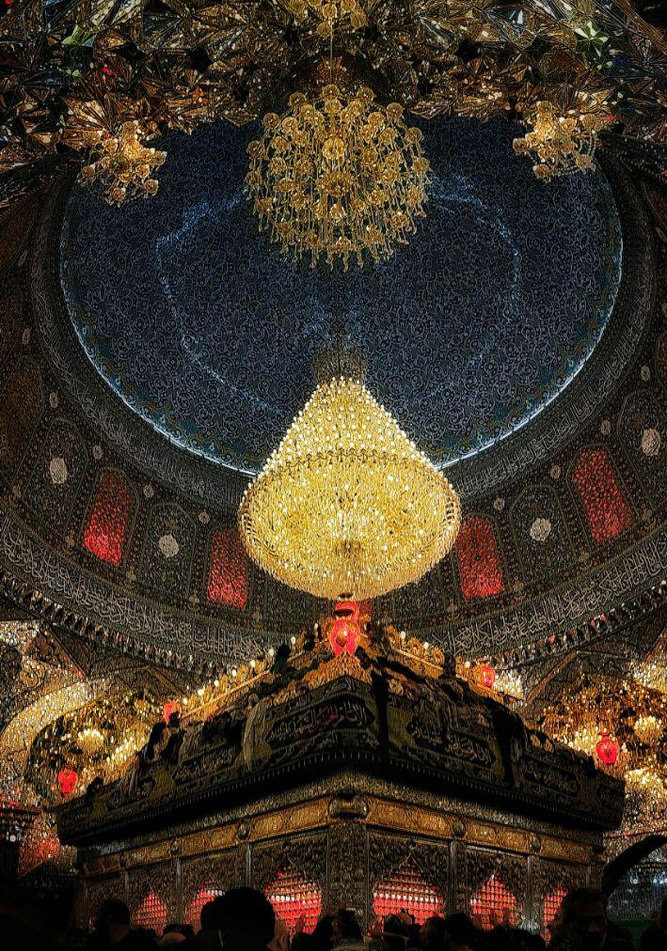

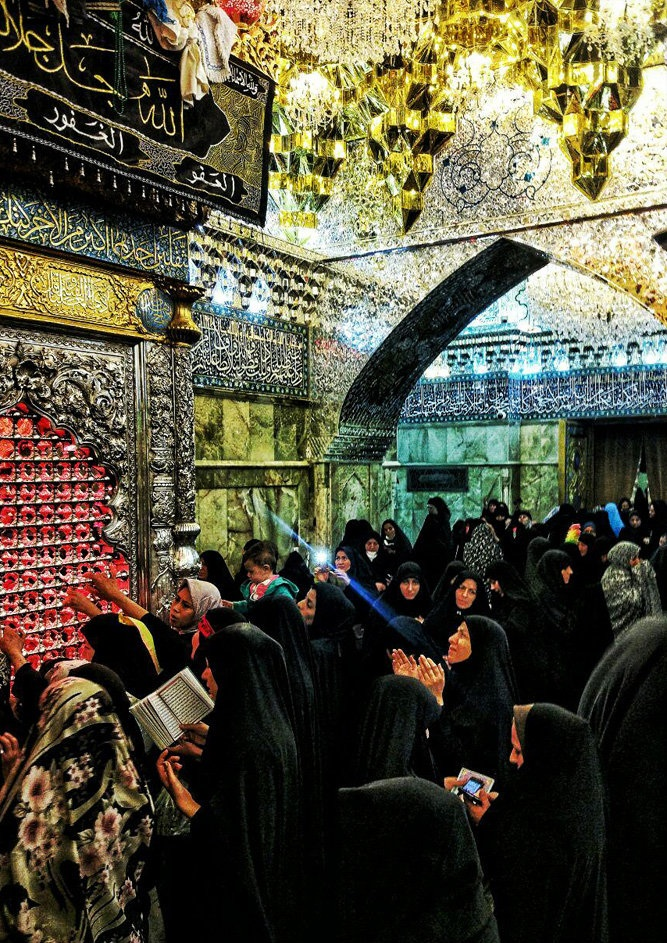

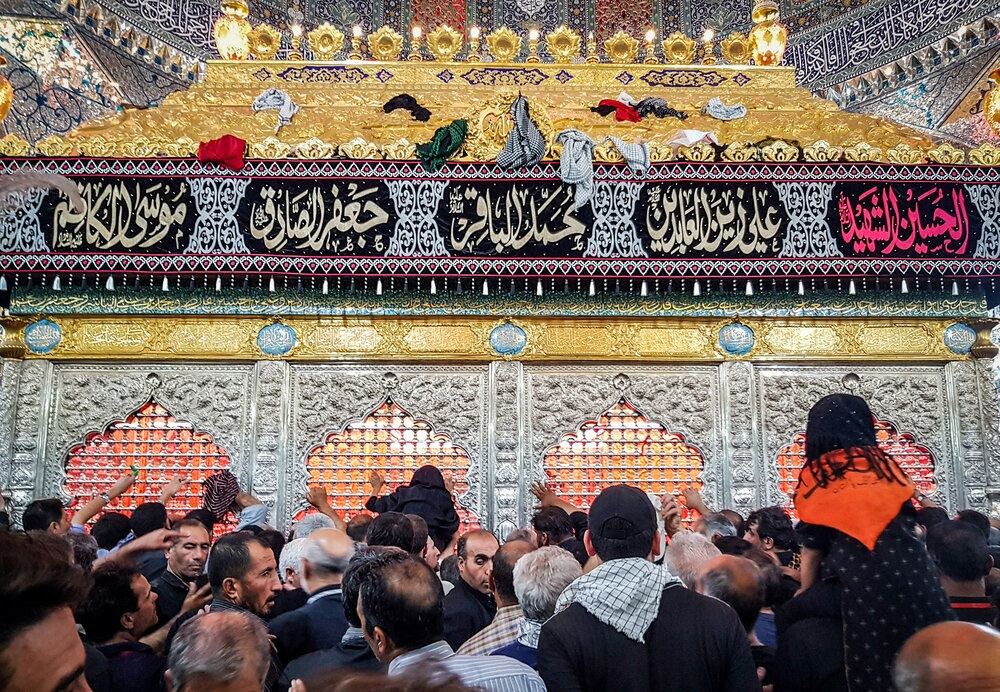

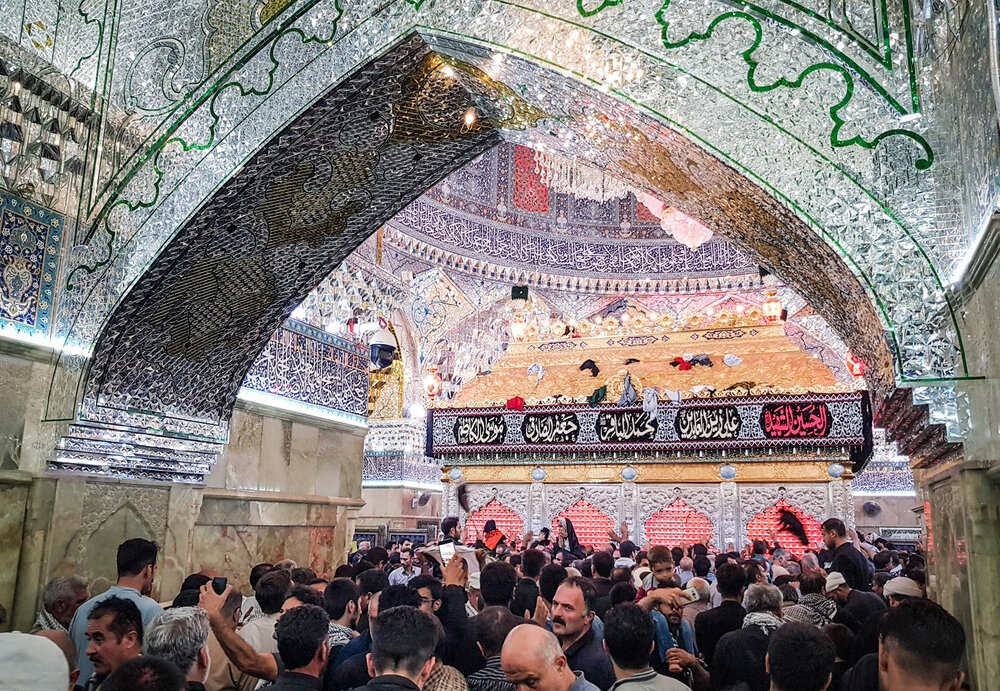

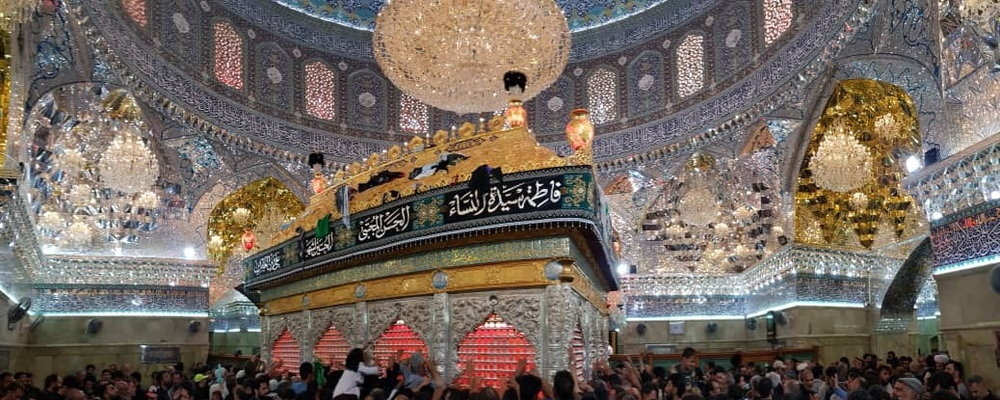

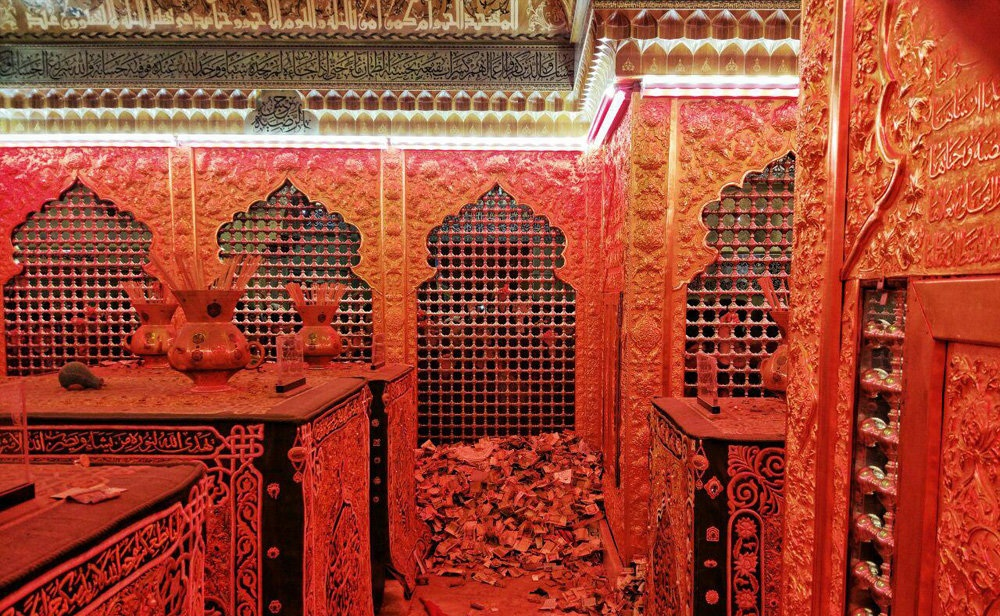

== See also ==
- Damage to Baghdad during the Iraq War
- Destruction of early Islamic heritage sites in Saudi Arabia
- Holiest sites in Shia Islam
- List of mosques in Iraq
- Shia Islam in Iraq
