= Mowaffak al-Rubaie =

Iraqi politician

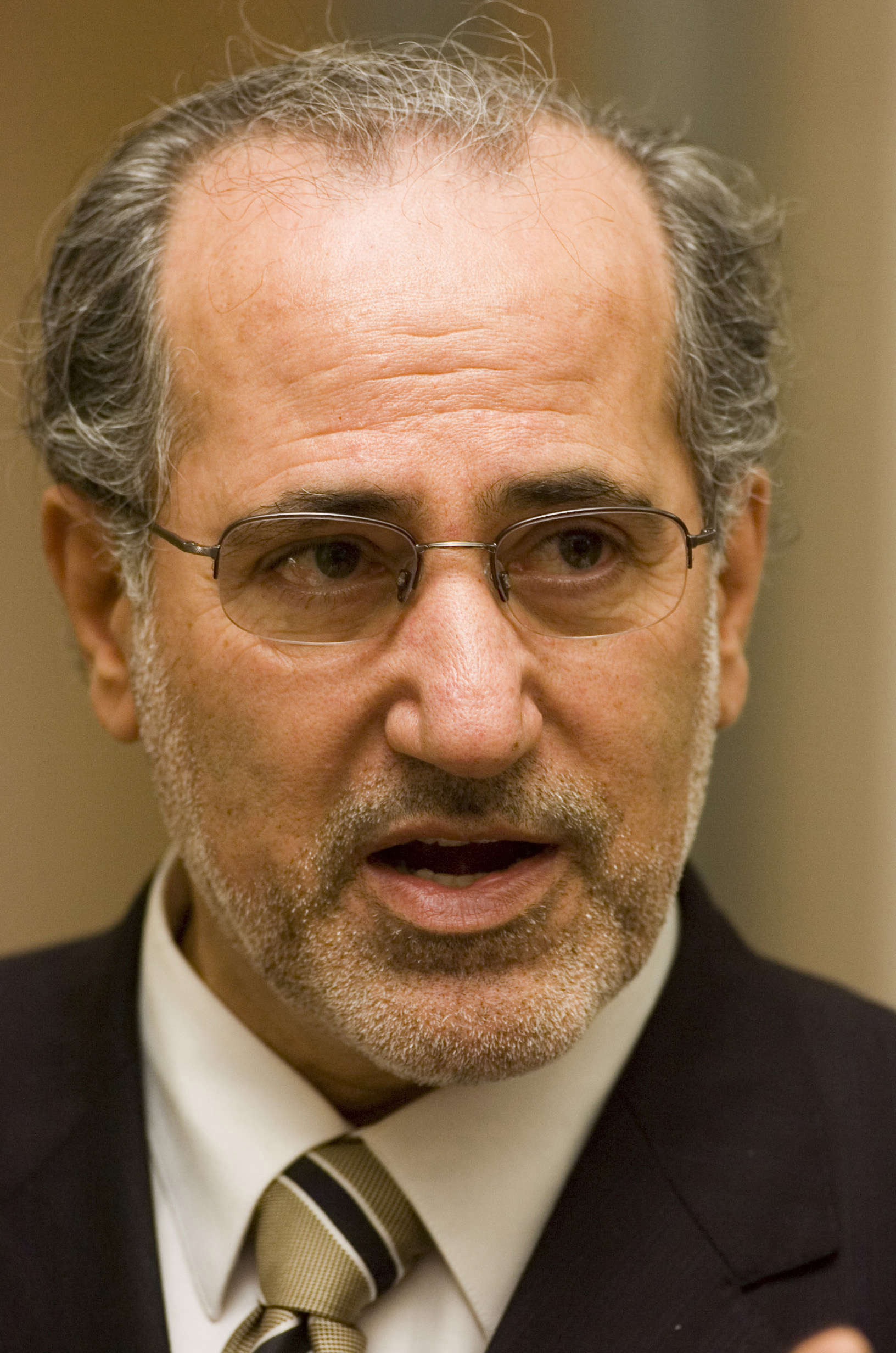
Mowaffak Baqer al-Rubaie, April 2007

Mowaffak Baker al-Rubaie (alternative transliterations Muwaffaq al Rubaie and Muwaffaq al-Rubay'i) (Arabic: موفق الربيعي, romanized: Muwaffaq ar-Rubayʿī) is an Iraqi politician who served as National Security Advisor in the government of Prime Minister Ayad Allawi and in 2005–2006 Prime Minister Ibrahim Al Jaafari and 2006–2009 Prime Minister Nouri al-Maliki. He was elected to the Iraqi Council of Representatives in December 2005 as a nominee of the United Iraqi Alliance and from 2014–2018 in the Iraqi Parliament.

== Biography ==
A Shia Muslim and neurologist by training, al-Rubaie was born 24 June 1948 in Dhi Qar Governorate in southern Iraq and left Iraq in 1979 to study in Britain. There he became a member of the British Royal College of Physicians and then a Fellow of the Royal College of Physicians practicing internal medicine and neurology. Whilst in London, he became the official spokesman for the Islamic Da'awa Party which was then the main political opposition party to then President Saddam Hussein.

After the United States' 2003 invasion of Iraq, he was appointed a member of the Iraqi Governing Council. In April 2004 he was appointed National Security Advisor by the Iraqi Governing Council. He held this post until 2009, thereafter serving as an MP in the following Parliamentary round.

Al-Rubaie played an important role in various negotiations, especially those between the Iraqi government and Moqtada al-Sadr during the siege of Najaf in 2004.

In 2006, al-Rubaie was widely criticised with his inhumane treatment of the condemned Saddam Hussein, as he conducted the transfer of custody of the prisoner from US to Iraqi judicial authorities culminating in the execution of Saddam on 30 December 2006. In an interview with Vice News in December 2019, al-Rubaie displayed a noose he purported was the one used to hang Hussein, and claimed he "pulled the trigger" to kill the former president.

== Reputation ==
Al-Rubaie is respected on both sides of the sectarian divide in Iraq as a pragmatic and non-partisan Nationalist whom then-deputy PM Ali Allawi gives high praise in his book The Occupation of Iraq: Winning the War, Losing the Peace (2007).

A winner of the Annual Middle East Peace Prize awarded by the Foundation For Peace & Democracy in the Middle East for his role in protecting Iraq's Christian Minority, Al-Rubaie maintains good relations with Bishop Andrew White, the Canon of Baghdad.

Al-Rubaie also maintains strong relations with Iraq's clerical community, particularly Grand Ayatollah Ali al-Sistani. In February 2004, he reported that Sistani had survived an assassination attempt.

== Trip to USA ==
In May, 2007, he made his first trip to Washington, D.C., to lobby leading Democratic critics of the war against withdrawing troops, primarily Senator Carl Levin and Representative John P. Murtha. al-Rubaie argued that Iraqi Prime Minister Nouri al-Maliki was making progress in stabilizing Iraq and that the United States should be patient as Iraqis make steady progress. He also met with supporters of the war, including Senator Joseph I. Lieberman.

== Center Party ==
Rubaie was dropped as Security Advisor in June 2009. Shortly after, al-Rubaie announced the formation of a new political party - the Center Party or al-Wasat. It was speculated that this party would form an alliance with the United Iraqi Alliance, the Islamic Supreme Council of Iraq and Ahmad Chalabi's Iraqi National Congress to contest the Iraqi legislative election in January 2010.
