= Haitham al-Badri =

AQI Commander

- Born: Haitham Sabah Shaker Mohammed al-Badri unknown likely Samarra (origin of the al-Badri clan and his principal area of operations)
- Died: 2 August 2007 Samarra, Salahuddin Governorate, Iraq
- Allegiance: Baathist Iraq (until 2003) Jamaat Ansar al-Sunna (2003–2004); Al-Qaeda (2004–2006): Al-Qaeda in Iraq (2004–2006); Islamic State of Iraq (2006–2007)
- Branch: Republican Guard (Iraq) (until 2003); Military of al-Qaeda in Iraq (2004–2006); Military of the Islamic State (2006–2007)
- Rank: Warrant Officer (until 2003); Commander (Al-Qaeda in Iraq) (2004–2006); Commander (Islamic State of Iraq) (2006–2007)
- Conflicts: Iraq War (2003–2007) †

Haitham Sabah Shaker Mohammed al-Badri (Arabic: هيثم صباح شاكر محمد البدري, died 2 August 2007) was a commander of Al-Qaeda in Iraq (AQI) in Salahuddin Province who reportedly masterminded the 2006 al-Askari mosque bombing which substantially damaged the Shiite mosque and set off a wave of retaliatory violence by the Shiites against other Muslims.

He was a former Iraqi government official under Saddam Hussein while other sources state he was a warrant officer in the Republican Guard; and following the US-led invasion in 2003, joined Jamaat Ansar al-Sunna before becoming a member of Al-Qaeda in Iraq. Badri was killed in a US airstrike east of Samarra on 2 August 2007.

He was a distant relative of future Islamic State leader Ibrahim al-Badri al-Samarrai (Abu Bakr al-Baghdadi), being the son of one of al-Baghdadi's cousins.
