= List of bombings during the Iraq War =

Bombings were a regular occurrence during the Iraq War. They resulted in tens of thousands of casualties throughout the country, killing and wounding civilians and combatants alike. Many Iraqi insurgents favoured the tactic of suicide bombing, which was used at a particularly unprecedented scale against the American-led Multi-National Force – Iraq (MNF–I). Additionally, during the 2003 invasion of Iraq, the United States and the United Kingdom collectively dropped 29,199 bombs on the country. This article does not list these aerial attacks, and instead concentrates on the smaller number of direct insurgent bombings during the sectarian conflict, when Shia Muslims and Sunni Muslims fought each other on the one hand and the MNF–I on the other hand.

== Insurgency ==
Most of the organized bombings were carried out by Sunni insurgents affiliated with Jama'at al-Tawhid wal Jihad, Al-Qaeda in Iraq, Jama'at Ansar al-Sunna, and the Islamic State of Iraq, among others. The main targets of these bombings were MNF–I troops and private military contractors, as well as local Iraqi collaborators. Upon the outbreak of the Iraqi civil war in 2006, the various Sunni and Shia militant groups fighting in the country had effectively shifted their focus away from the MNF–I and began increasingly targeting Iraqi civilians on the basis of their sectarian affiliation.

A 2005 report by Human Rights Watch analyzed the Iraqi insurgency and highlighted: "The groups that are most responsible for the abuse, namely al-Qaeda in Iraq and its allies, Ansar al-Sunna and the Islamic State of Iraq, have all targeted civilians for abductions and executions. The first two groups have repeatedly boasted about massive car bombs and suicide bombs in mosques, markets, bus stations and other civilian areas. Such acts are war crimes and in some cases may constitute crimes against humanity, which are defined as serious crimes committed as part of a widespread or systematic attack against a civilian population."

A 2008 research brief by the RAND Corporation on the subject of counter-insurgency tactics in Iraq between 2003 and 2006 depicts a chart that shows that in June and July 2004, Iraqi insurgents began to shift their focus away from attacking coalition forces with roadside bombs and instead began targeting the Iraqi population with suicide bombers and vehicle-borne IEDs. By increasing the number of suicide bombings against civilians and accepting their targeting in retribution, the insurgents sought to expose the weakness of the coalition's and Iraqi government's security and reconstruction apparatus, threaten those who collaborated with the government, generate funds and propaganda, and increasingly enact sectarian revenge. The U.S. failure to adapt to this shift had dramatic consequences. By June 2004, U.S. deaths represented less than 10% of overall deaths on the battlefield and Iraqi deaths represented more than 90%—a figure that remained constant for the next 18 months of the war.

An analysis by Iraq Body Count and co-authors published in 2011 concluded that at least 12,284 civilians were killed in at least 1,003 suicide bombings in Iraq between 2003 and 2010. The study states that suicide bombings killed 60 times as many civilians as they did soldiers.

== Bombings by the invasion forces ==
This article does not list airstrikes and other bombings by the USA and allied invasion forces. According to the USAF (Operation Iraqi Freedom–By The Numbers, 30 April 2003), as analysed by Human Rights Watch, the first phase of the military campaign included 41,404 sorties by 1,801 aircraft dropping over 29,000 munitions and 247,000 submunitions (from cluster bombs) in the three weeks between 20 March and 9 April 2003.

Precision-guided munitions
Designation	Name or Nickname	Type	Number
BGM-109	Tomahawk Land Attack Missile (TLAM)	Cruise Missile	802
AGM-114	Hellfire	Laser-Guided Missile	562
AGM-130		Television- or Infrared-Guided Missile	4
AGM-65	Maverick	Television-, Infrared-, or Laser-Guided Missile	918
AGM-84	Stand Off Land Attack Missile-Extended Response (SLAM(ER))	Cruise Missile	3
AGM-86C/D	Conventional Air-Launched Cruise Missile (CALCM)	Cruise Missile	153
AGM-88	High Speed Anti-Radiation Missile (HARM)	Anti-Radar Missile	408
AGM-154	Joint Stand Off Weapon (JSOW)	GPS/Inertial Navigation System-Guided Glide Missile	253
EGBU-27	Penetrator	Laser- and GPS-Guided Missile (2,000 lb)	98
GBU-10	Paveway II	Laser-Guided Bomb (2,000 lb)	236
GBU-12	Paveway II	Laser-Guided Bomb (500 lb)	7,114
GBU-16	Paveway II	Laser-Guided Bomb (1,000 lb)	1,233
GBU-24	Paveway III	Laser-Guided Bomb (2,000 lb)	23
GBU-27	Penetrator	Laser-Guided Bomb (2,000 lb)	11
GBU-28	Bunker Buster	Laser-Guided Bomb (5,000 lb)	1
GBU-31	Joint Direct Attack Munition (JDAM)	GPS-Guided Bomb (2,000 lb)	5,086
GBU-32	JDAM	GPS-Guided Bomb (1,000 lb)	768
GBU-35	JDAM	GPS-Guided Bomb (1,000 lb)	675
GBU-37	JDAM	GPS-Guided Bomb (5,000 lb)	13
Various	U.K. Guided Munitions		679
Total			19,040

Unguided unitary munitions
Designation	Type	Number
M117	General Purpose Bomb (750 lb)	1,625
Mk-82	General Purpose Bomb (500 lb)	5,504
Mk-83	General Purpose Bomb (1,000 lb)	1,692
Mk-84	General Purpose Bomb (2,000 lb)	6
Various	U.K. General Purpose Bombs	58
Total		8,885

Cluster bombs
Designation	Name	Guidance	Number	Submunitions per Weapon	Total Submunitions
CBU-87		Unguided	118	202	23,836
CBU-99	Rockeye	Unguided	182	247	44,954
CBU-103		WCMD	818	202	165,236
CBU-105	Sensor Fuzed Weapon	WCMD, Infrared	88	40 (10 submunitions with 4 skeets)	3,520
CBU-107	Passive Attack Weapon System	WCMD			Non-explosive
UK RBL-755		Unguided	70	147	10,290
Total			1,276		247,836

== Bombings by the insurgency ==
This article lists bombings by the insurgency during the Iraq War, which took place between 2003 and 2011. For bombings that occurred following the withdrawal of U.S. troops from the country, see: List of bombings during the Iraqi insurgency (2011–2013).

Date	City	Attack	Deaths	Perpetrator(s)	Source
7 August 2003	Baghdad	2003 Jordanian embassy bombing in Baghdad	17	Unknown	
19 August 2003	Baghdad	Canal Hotel bombing	23	Jama'at al-Tawhid wal-Jihad	
29 August 2003	Najaf	Imam Ali Mosque bombing	95	Unknown	
27 October 2003	Baghdad	27 October 2003 Baghdad bombings	34	Unknown	
12 November 2003	Nasiriyah	2003 Nasiriyah bombing	28	Jama'at al-Tawhid wal-Jihad	
27 December 2003	Karbala	2003 Karbala bombings	19	Jama'at al-Tawhid wal-Jihad	
1 February 2004	Erbil	2004 Erbil bombings	114	Unknown	
2 March 2004	Karbala and Baghdad	2004 Ashura bombings in Iraq	158	Unknown	
21 April 2004	Basra	21 April 2004 Basra bombings	74	Unknown	
24 June 2004	Mosul	2004 Mosul bombings	62	Jama'at al-Tawhid wal-Jihad	
28 July 2004	Baqubah	2004 Baqubah bombing	68	Unknown	
26 August 2004	Kufa	2004 Kufa mosque bombing	74	Unknown	
14 September 2004	Baghdad	14 September 2004 Baghdad bombing	47	Unknown	
30 September 2004	Baghdad	30 September 2004 Baghdad bombing	41	Jama'at al-Tawhid wal-Jihad	
19 December 2004	Karbala and Najaf	2004 Karbala and Najaf bombings	66	Unknown	
21 December 2004	Mosul	2004 Forward Operating Base Marez bombing	22	Jamaat Ansar al-Sunna	
19 January 2005	Baghdad	19 January 2005 Baghdad bombings	26	Tanzim Qa'idat al-Jihad fi Bilad al-Rafidayn	
28 February 2005	Hillah	2005 Al Hillah bombing	127	Raed Mansour al-Banna	
16 July 2005	Baghdad	2005 Musayyib bombing	100	Unknown	
17 August 2005	Musayyib	17 August 2005 Baghdad bombings	43	Unknown	
18 November 2005	Khanaqin	2005 Khanaqin bombings	74	Unknown	
5 January 2006	Karbala and Ramadi	5 January 2006 Iraq bombings	140	Unknown	
22 February 2006	Samarra	2006 al-Askari mosque bombing	0	Unknown	
7 April 2006	Baghdad	Buratha mosque bombing	85	Unknown	
1 July 2006	Baghdad	1 July 2006 Sadr City bombing	77	"The Supporters of the Sunni People"	
23 November 2006	Baghdad	23 November 2006 Sadr City bombings	215	Unknown	
16 January 2007	Baghdad	Mustansiriya University bombings	70	Unknown	
22 January 2007	Baghdad	22 January 2007 Baghdad bombings	88	Unknown	
3 February 2007	Baghdad	3 February 2007 Baghdad market bombing	135	Unknown	
12 February 2007	Baghdad	12 February 2007 Baghdad bombings	76	Unknown	
18 February 2007	Baghdad	18 February 2007 Baghdad bombings	63	Unknown	
6 March 2007	Hillah	2007 Al Hillah bombings	200	Unknown	
27 March 2007	Tal Afar	2007 Tal Afar bombings and massacre	152	Unknown	
29 March 2007	Baghdad	29 March 2007 Baghdad bombings	82	Unknown	
12 April 2007	Baghdad	2007 Iraqi Parliament bombing	1	Islamic State of Iraq	
14 April 2007	Karbala	2007 Karbala mosque bombings	42	Unknown	
18 April 2007	Baghdad	18 April 2007 Baghdad bombings	198	Unknown	
28 April 2007	Karbala	2007 Karbala mosque bombings	68	Unknown	
13 May 2007	Makhmour	2007 Makhmour bombing	50	Unknown	
13 June 2007	Samarra	2007 al-Askari mosque bombing	0	Unknown	
7 July 2007	Amirli	2007 Amirli bombing	156	Unknown	
16 July 2007	Kirkuk	2007 Kirkuk bombings	86	Unknown	
26 July 2007	Baghdad	26 July 2007 Baghdad market bombing	92	Unknown	
1 August 2007	Baghdad	1 August 2007 Baghdad bombings	74	Unknown	
14 August 2007	Til Ezer and Siba Sheikh Khidir	Qahtaniyah bombings	796	Unknown	
13 December 2007	Amarah	2007 Al Amarah bombings	46	Unknown	
1 February 2008	Baghdad	1 February 2008 Baghdad bombings	98	Unknown	
10 February 2008	Balad	2008 Balad bombing	25	Unknown	
6 March 2008	Baghdad	6 March 2008 Baghdad bombing	68	Unknown	
17 March 2008	Karbala	2008 Karbala bombing	42	Unknown	
17 June 2008	Baghdad	17 June 2008 Baghdad bombing	51	Unknown	
15 July 2008	Baqubah	2008 Baquba bombings	35	Islamic State of Iraq	
12 September 2008	Dujail	2008 Dujail bombing	31	Islamic State of Iraq	
11 December 2008	Dujail	Abdullah restaurant bombing	55	Unknown	
8 March 2009	Baghdad	2009 Baghdad police recruitment centre bombing	28	Unknown	
6 April 2009	Baghdad	2009 Baghdad bombings	34	Unknown	
23 April 2009	Baghdad and Miqdadiyah	23 April 2009 Iraqi suicide attacks	76	Unknown	
20 June 2009	Taza Khurmatu	2009 Taza bombing	73	Unknown	
24 June 2009	Baghdad	June 2009 Baghdad bombing	69	Unknown	
30 June 2009	Kirkuk	2009 Kirkuk bombing	40	Unknown	
9 July 2009	Tal Afar	2009 Tal Afar bombing	40	Unknown	
19 August 2009	Baghdad	August 2009 Baghdad bombings	101	Islamic State of Iraq	
25 October 2009	Baghdad	October 2009 Baghdad bombings	155	Islamic State of Iraq	
8 December 2009	Baghdad	December 2009 Baghdad bombings	127	Islamic State of Iraq	
25 January 2010	Baghdad	25 January 2010 Baghdad bombings	41	Unknown	
1 February 2010	Baghdad	1 February 2010 Baghdad bombing	54	Unknown	
3 March 2010	Baghdad	2010 Baqubah bombings	33	Unknown	
23 April 2010	Baghdad	April 2010 Baghdad bombings	85	Unknown	
10 May 2010	Iraq	10 May 2010 Iraq attacks	114	Unknown	
8 July 2010	Baghdad	July 2010 Baghdad attacks	70	Unknown	
17 August 2010	Baghdad	17 August 2010 Baghdad bombings	69	Islamic State of Iraq	
25 August 2010	Iraq	25 August 2010 Iraq bombings	53	Islamic State of Iraq	
19 September 2010	Baghdad	19 September 2010 Baghdad bombings	31	Islamic State of Iraq	
31 October 2010	Baghdad	31 October 2010 Baghdad bombings	69	Islamic State of Iraq	
2 November 2010	Baghdad	19 September 2010 Baghdad bombings	113	Islamic State of Iraq	
18 January 2011	Tikrit	January 2011 Iraq suicide attacks	63	Islamic State of Iraq	
19 January 2011	Baqubah	January 2011 Iraq suicide attacks	12	Unknown	
20 January 2011	Karbala	January 2011 Iraq suicide attacks	56	Unknown	
24 January 2011	Baghdad and Karbala	24 January 2011 Iraq bombings	56	Unknown	
27 January 2011	Baghdad	27 January 2011 Baghdad bombing	48	Unknown	
12 February 2011	Samarra	2011 Samarra bombing	48	Unknown	
29 March 2011	Tikrit	2011 Tikrit assault	65	Islamic State of Iraq	
5 May 2011	Hillah	2011 Al Hillah bombing	24	Islamic State of Iraq	
21 June 2011	Diwaniyah	2011 Al Diwaniyah bombing	27	Islamic State of Iraq	
5 July 2011	Taji	2011 Taji bombings	35	Unknown	
15 August 2011	Iraq	15 August 2011 Iraq attacks	64	Unknown	
28 August 2011	Baghdad	28 August 2011 Baghdad bombing	32	Islamic State of Iraq	
25 September 2011	Karbala	2011 Karbala bombing	25	Unknown	
7 October 2011	Baghdad	October 2011 Baghdad bombings	7	Unknown	
10 October 2011	Baghdad	October 2011 Baghdad bombings	10	Unknown	
12 October 2011	Baghdad	October 2011 Baghdad bombings	29	Unknown	
13 October 2011	Baghdad	October 2011 Baghdad bombings	18	Unknown	
24 November 2011	Basra	2011 Basra bombings	18	Unknown	

== See also ==
- Terrorist incidents in Iraq in 2021
- Terrorist incidents in Iraq in 2020
- Terrorist incidents in Iraq in 2017
- Terrorist incidents in Iraq in 2016
- Terrorist incidents in Iraq in 2015
- Terrorist incidents in Iraq in 2014
- Terrorist incidents in Iraq in 2013
- Terrorist incidents in Iraq in 2012
