= List of terrorist incidents in Iraq =

This is a list of terrorist incidents in Iraq from 2003 to the present.

== Summary counts ==
Terror attacks in Iraq per year according to the Statista Research Department (2006–2020), Iraq’s Counter Terrorism Service – CTS and US Department of State (2021, 2022):

2000. N/A
2001. N/A
2002. N/A
2003. N/A
2004. N/A
2005. N/A
2006. 6,608
2007. 6,210
2008. 3,255
2009. 2,458
2010. 2,687
2011. 2,265
2012. 1,271
2013. 2,501
2014. 3,370
2015. 2,417
2016. 2,969
2017. 1,961
2018. 765
2019. 542
2020. 629
2021. 140+
2022. 408
2023. N/A
2024. N/A
2025. N/A

== Terrorist incidents in the 2020s ==
=== 2023 ===
See also: Attacks on US bases

Name	Date	Dead	Injured	Involved	Location - Circumstances
2023 Tarmiyah attack	April 8	8	4	Islamic State	Baghdad Governorate, North of Baghdad, near Tarmiyah – A PMF convoy was attacked by ISIS members, killing eight and injuring four.
Murder of Khwanas Wirya	June 22	1	0	Islamist	Sulaymaniyah Governorate, Chamchamal
2023 Salah al-Din attacks	June 29	13	24	Islamic State	Salah al-Din province – Several villages were attacked by ISIS members, killing 13 people and injuring 24 others.
2023 Al-Sa’adiya market attack	October 14	9	15	Islamic State	Diyala Governorate, Al-Sa’adiya – A car bomb near a market in the town of Al-Sa’adiya killed 9 civilians and injured 15.
2023 Al-Asad Airbase attack	November 20		8	IAMGs (Iran-aligned militia groups)	Al Anbar Governorate, Al-Asad Airbase – Eight U.S. military members were injured by a ballistic missile attack.
2023 Erbil Airbase attack	December 25		3	IAMGs (Iran-aligned militia groups)	Erbil Governorate, Erbil Airbase – Three members of the U.S. military were injured by a drone attack.

=== 2022 ===
Name	Date	Dead	Injured	Involved	Location - Circumstances
2022 Diyala massacre	January 12	11		Islamic State	Diyala Governorate, Al-Azim
2022 Diyala attack	January 21	11		Islamic State	Diyala Governorate – ISIS members attacked an Iraqi Army outpost, killing 11 soldiers.
2022 May attacks	May 24	12	6	Islamic State	Kirkuk Governorate – In two separate attacks, ISIS members killed 12 and injured six people in the South of the Kirkuk province.
2022 Kirkuk bombing	December 18	10	2	Islamic State	Kirkuk Governorate, Riyadh district, near the village of Chalal al-Matar – Nine Iraqi federal police members died in an IED attack.

=== 2021 ===
See: Terrorist incidents in Iraq in 2021

=== 2020 ===
See: Terrorist incidents in Iraq in 2020

== Terrorist incidents in the 2010s ==
=== 2019 ===
Name	Date	Dead	Injured	Involved	Location - Circumstances
2019 Karbala bombing	September 20	12	5+	Islamic State	Karbala Governorate, near Karbala – A bomb exploded on a minibus and killed 12 civilians and injured at least 5.

=== 2018 ===
Name	Date	Dead	Injured	Involved	Location - Circumstances
2018 Baghdad bombings	January 15	38	105+	Islamic State	Baghdad Governorate, Baghdad – Two suicide bombings took place at al-Tayaran Square of Baghdad, killing 36 and injuring more than 105.
2018 Asdira funeral bombing	April 12	25	18	Islamic State	Saladin Governorate, Al-Shirqat District, Asdira

=== 2017 ===
See: Terrorist incidents in Iraq in 2017

=== 2016 ===
See: Terrorist incidents in Iraq in 2016

=== 2015 ===
See: Terrorist incidents in Iraq in 2015

=== 2014 ===
See: Terrorist incidents in Iraq in 2014

=== 2013 ===
See: Terrorist incidents in Iraq in 2013

=== 2012 ===
See: Terrorist incidents in Iraq in 2012

=== 2011 ===
Name	Date	Dead	Injured	Involved	Location - Circumstances
2011 Al Hillah bombing	May 5	24	72+	Islamic State	Babylon Governorate, Hillah – A suicide bomber detonated a car filled with explosives at a local police station, killing 24 and injuring at least 72.
22 December 2011 Baghdad bombings					
October 2011 Baghdad bombings					
2011 Basra bombings					
2011 Al Diwaniyah bombing					
15 August 2011 Iraq attacks					
January 2011 Iraq attacks					
2011 Karbala bombing					
2011 Samarra bombing					
2011 Taji bombings					
2011 Tikrit assault					
August 2011 Umm al-Qura Mosque bombing					

=== 2010 ===
See: Terrorist incidents in Iraq in 2010

== Terrorist incidents in the 2000s ==
=== 2009 ===
See: Terrorist incidents in Iraq in 2009

=== 2008 ===
See: Terrorist incidents in Iraq in 2008

=== 2007 ===
See: Terrorist incidents in Iraq in 2007

=== 2006 ===
See: Terrorist incidents in Iraq in 2006

=== 2005 ===
See: Terrorist incidents in Iraq in 2005

=== 2004 ===
See: Terrorist incidents in Iraq in 2004

=== 2003 ===
See: Terrorist incidents in Iraq in 2003

== See also ==
- Islamic State insurgency in Iraq (2017–present)
- Persecution of Christians by the Islamic State
- Iraqi Turkmen genocide
- Persecution of Iraqi Turkmen in Ba'athist Iraq
- Human rights in Ba'athist Iraq
- Human rights in Islamic State-controlled territory
- Iraq War and the war on terror
- Al-Qaeda in Iraq
