= Terrorist incidents in Iraq in 2009 =

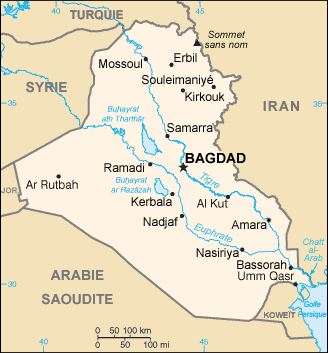
A map of Iraq

This article details major terrorist incidents in Iraq in 2009. In 2009, there were 257 suicide bombings in Iraq. On April 23, a suicide bombing to a restaurant in Miqdadiyah killed 57 people, while a separate bombing in southeastern Baghdad killed 28. The next day, on April 24, a Shi'a shrine was targeted, in a bombing that killed 60. October and December saw two attacks kill over 100 people, with bombings on October 25 (155 deaths) and December 8 (over 100 deaths).

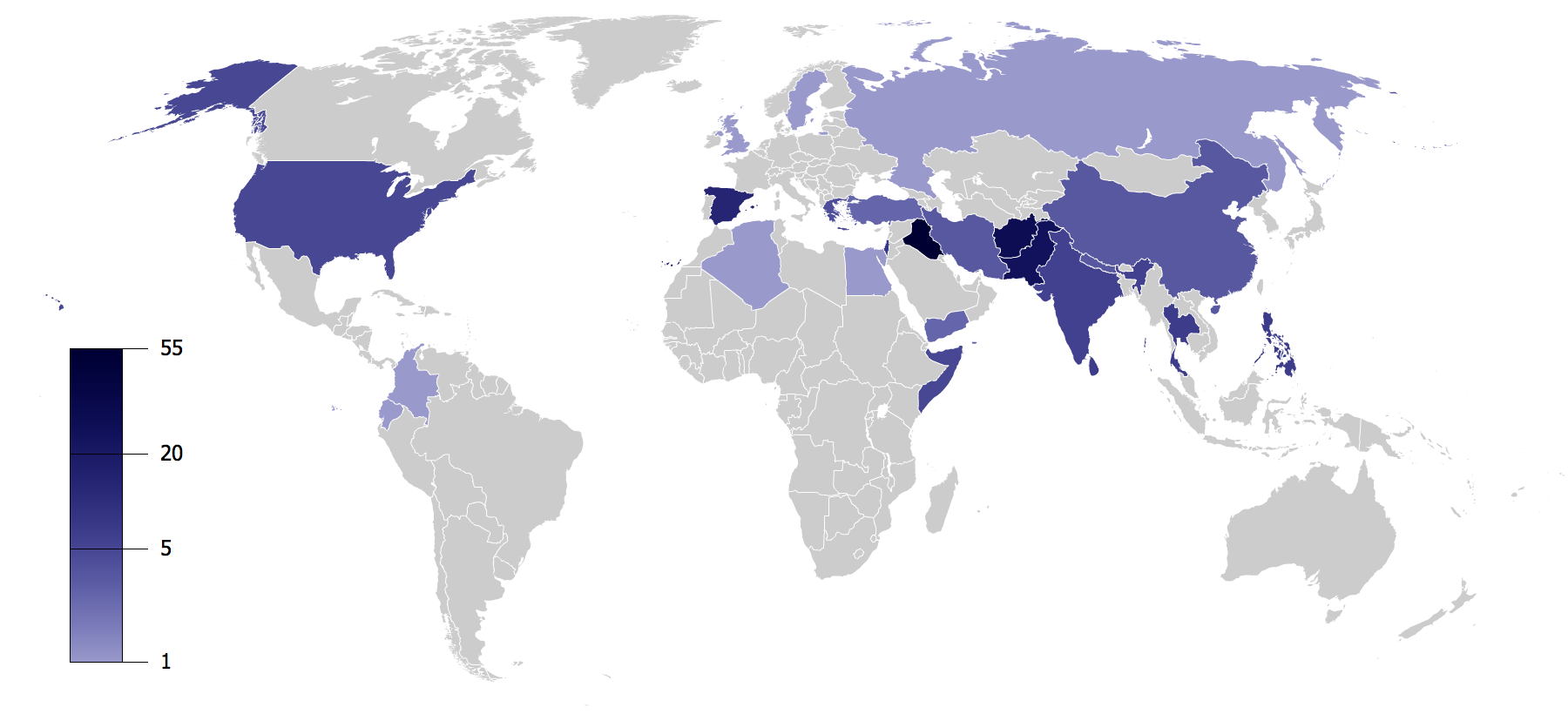
A map depicting the number of terrorist incidents occurring in the year 2009 across the world. Iraq, Pakistan, and Afghanistan are shown as having suffered the most attacks

== January ==
- January 1: Three police officers were killed following a truck bombing in Mosul.
- January 2: At least 23 people have been killed and 110 injured in a suicide bombing in Yusufiya, a town south of Baghdad.
- January 4: A female suicide bomber blows herself up among a crowd of pilgrims worshipping at the Imam Mousa al-Kazim shrine in northern Baghdad, killing 38 people and wounding 72.
- January 6: A suicide car bomber wounded five policemen and three civilians, striking their patrol in Mosul.
- January 24: A suicide car bomber killed five policemen and wounded 13 other people, including six police officers, at a checkpoint in Al Karmah.

== February ==
- February 5: A female suicide bomber killed 15 and wounded 13 in a suicide bombing at a restaurant in Baquba.
- February 9: At around 11 AM, someone crashed a pickup truck carrying explosives into an armored vehicle with U.S. soldiers passing by an Iraqi police checkpoint in the Jadid district of Mosul, killing 4 U.S. soldiers (battalion commander Lt. Col. Garnet "Gary" R. Derby, as well as Sgt. Joshua A. Ward, Pfc. Albert R. Jex, and Pfc. Jonathan R. Roberge) and their interpreter, and wounding two Iraqi police and a civilian.
- February 13: A female suicide bomber killed more than 30 Shia pilgrims and injured 35 in an attack on Shia pilgrims in a region north of Hillah. The death toll, later rose to 35 with 76 being injured, including 28 children.

== March ==
- March 8: Baghdad police recruitment centre bombing: suicide bomber on a motorcycle blew himself up as he entered a crowd of people outside a police recruitment center killing 28.
- March 10: Suicide car bomb went off outside a national reconciliation conference in Baghdad, killing at least 33 and wounding 46.

== April ==
- April 6: A spate of bombings in the same day (of unknown coordination) kills 32 and injures another 124 more.
- April 10: 8 people, including 5 U.S. soldiers were killed and 60 people were wounded when a suicide truck bomber breached the outer security barrier of Iraqi National Police headquarters in southern Mosul, and detonated his explosives.
- April 11: At least nine people were killed and another 23 wounded on Saturday when a suicide bomber struck the headquarters of a US-allied Sunni militia south of Baghdad.
- April 16: 26 people were injured after a suicide bomber in Iraq's Anbar province attacked an army base.
- April 20: 8 U.S. soldiers and 9 civilians were badly injured in a suicide bombing in Baquba, capital of the Diyala province. The suicide bomber was wearing a police uniform, According to the deputy mayor of the city, the bomber mingled in with Iraqi and U.S. soldiers before setting off his explosive vest .
- April 23: 57 people, were killed in a suicide bombing in a restaurant in Muqdadiya, in Diyala. As many as 55 were injured In another suicide bombing 28 people were killed and 52 wounded in a suicide attack on a police patrol in southeastern Baghdad.
- April 24: 30 people were killed in a suicide bombing outside the most important Shi'a shrine in Baghdad. The death toll of this double bombing reached 60. It included 25 Iranian pilgrims. 125 people were injured.

== May ==
- May 1: A suicide bombing near a coffee shop in Mosul killed 6 people.
- May 12: 5 policemen and 1 civilian were killed whereas 11 people were injured after a suicide bombing in Kirkuk.
- May 21: A suicide bombing in Kirkuk killed 5 awakening militia members. Separately, 15 people were killed including 3 U.S. soldiers when a suicide bombing struck a US Army patrol in southern Baghdad.

== June ==
- June 1: A suicide bombing at a police checkpoint in Diyala killed a policeman and wounded 9.
- June 4: 1 civilian was killed and 6 were injured by a car-suicide bombing in Mosul.
- June 20: 15 people were killed and 150 were injured by a truck-suicide bombing at a Shi'a Mosque in Kirkuk.
- June 22: 7 policemen were killed and 13 people were injured by a suicide bombing in Abu Ghraib.

== July ==
- July 29: 7 people died during an explosion of a Sunni political party office near Baghdad.

== August ==
- August 13: At least 20 people were killed and 30 wounded in a double suicide bombing in northern Iraq, an Iraqi Interior Ministry official said. Two suicide bombers with explosive vests carried out the attack at a cafe in Sinjar, a town west of Mosul. In Sinjar, many townspeople are members of the Yazidi minority.
- August 19: 101 people are killed during simultaneous suicide truck and car bombings at the Iraq's Foreign and Finance ministries.
- August 29: A suicide bomber detonates a van full of explosives outside a police base in Salahudin province, north of Baghdad, killing nine Iraqi police officers and wounding at least 14 others.
- August 30: A suicide car bombing at a checkpoint in Baghdad's Adhamiya neighborhood kills at least one person and injures 12 others.

== September ==
- September 17: Three civilians are killed and three police officers are wounded when a suicide truck bomber attacks a police checkpoint in Tal Afar, approximately 260 miles northwest of Baghdad.

== October ==
- October 11: A series of apparently coordinated bombings aimed at a meeting for national reconciliation killed 23 people and wounded 65 others in western Iraq, but they did not injure the officials who were at the gathering. About one hour after the first two bombings, a man driving a car filled with explosives attempted to speed through a security checkpoint near the Ramadi General Hospital; he was shot by a police officer at the checkpoint but managed to explode the car, killing himself and wounding two others.
- October 25: Bomb blasts against governmental municipalities buildings kill at least 155 people and injure more than 700 others in central Baghdad, in the deadliest attack in Iraq since August 2007.

== December ==
- December 8: Bomb blasts kill more than 100 people and injure more than 400 others in Baghdad.
