= 2003 Karbala bombings =

Four suicide attacks in Iraq

- Part of Iraqi insurgency (2003–2006) in Iraqi insurgency (2003–2011)
- Location: Karbala, Iraq
- Date: December 27, 2003
- Target: Coalition military barracks
- Attack type: Suicide Bombings
- Deaths: 14 soldiers, 5 civilians
- Injuries: 200+ injured (including 36 coalition soldiers)
- Perpetrator: Jama'at al-Tawhid wal-Jihad
- Motive: Occupation of Iraq

The 2003 Karbala bombings consisted of four suicide attacks on the Coalition military barracks in Karbala, Iraq, 110 kilometres (68 mi) south of Baghdad on December 27, 2003.

The attackers targeted two coalition bases and a downtown Iraqi police station where U.S. military police were stationed. All of the attacks occurred within a 20-minute span.

== The attacks ==
Bulgarian guards at the perimeter of their forward base at the University of Karbala shot the suicide bomber as the gasoline tanker bore down on the front entrance. Nevertheless, the bomb exploded about 50 feet (15 m) from the base's main building, killing four Bulgarian soldiers and wounding 27 others, one of whom died from his injuries on the next day. The soldiers killed were Major Georgi Kachorin, Lieutenant Nikolai Saruev and Officer Candidates Ivan Indjov, Anton Petrov and Svilen Kirov. The Bulgarian Army chief of staff, Nikola Kolev, said they expected attacks because Karbala had been suspiciously peaceful.

In the attack on the Thai Humanitarian Assistance Task Force 976 Thai-Iraq camp the bomber killed two Thai soldiers and wounded five others when he rammed his vehicle into the walls. The Thais were confident enough about their security that they planned to send 200 Thai civilians to visit their troops.

In the double attack on the police station, seven Iraqi police officers and five civilians were killed. Five American soldiers were among the wounded.

=== Reaction ===
After the bombings, UN Security Council President Stefan Tafrov condemned the attacks. In Bulgaria, questions were raised by the country's participation in Iraq and the salaries soldiers received for their international service in a warzone. Bulgaria would continue to support their allies efforts in Iraq until 2008, at a loss of 13 soldiers.

== See also ==
- 2004 Karbala and Najaf bombings
- 5 January 2006 Iraq bombings
- 2007 Karbala bombings
- 2008 Karbala bombing
- 24 January 2011 Iraq bombings
- 2011 Karbala bombing
