= List of bombings during the Iraqi insurgency (2017–present) =

This article lists major bombings during the Iraqi insurgency (2017–present), which followed the War in Iraq (2013–2017).

== Bombings ==
This article lists all major bombings after 9 December 2017. For bombings that occurred prior this date see List of bombings during the Iraq War or List of bombings during the Iraqi insurgency (2011–2013)

Date	City	Attack	Deaths	Perpetrator	Source
15 January 2018	(Iraq) Baghdad	2018 Baghdad bombings	38	Islamic State	
9 May 2019	(Iraq) Baghdad	2019 Baghdad bombing	8	Islamic State	
21 January 2021	(Iraq) Baghdad	January 2021 Baghdad bombings	32	Islamic State	
19 July 2021	(Iraq) Baghdad	July 2021 Baghdad Bombing	35	Islamic State	
7 December 2021	(Iraq) Basra	2021 Basra explosion	7	Unknown	
18 December 2022	(Iraq) Kirkuk	2022 Kirkuk bombing	9	Islamic State	
