= Bombing of Iraq =

There have been several bombings of Iraq:

- Gulf War air campaign
- Cruise missile strikes on Iraq (1993)
- Cruise missile strikes on Iraq (1996)
- Bombing of Iraq (1998)
- No fly zones conflict (1991-2003)
- 2003 invasion of Iraq
- Bombings during the Iraq War
- 2014 military intervention against ISIL
