= Terrorist incidents in Iraq in 2008 =

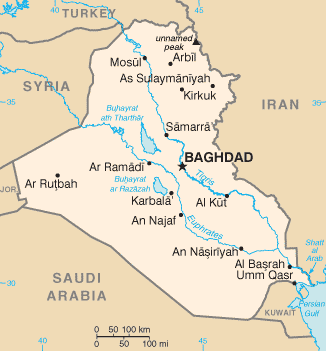
A map of Iraq

This article details major terrorist incidents in Iraq in 2008. In 2008, there were 257 suicide bombings in Iraq. On February 1, a pair of bombs detonated at a market in Baghdad, killing 99 people and injuring 200. Two other particularly deadly attacks occurred on March 6 (53 deaths), and June 17 (63 deaths).

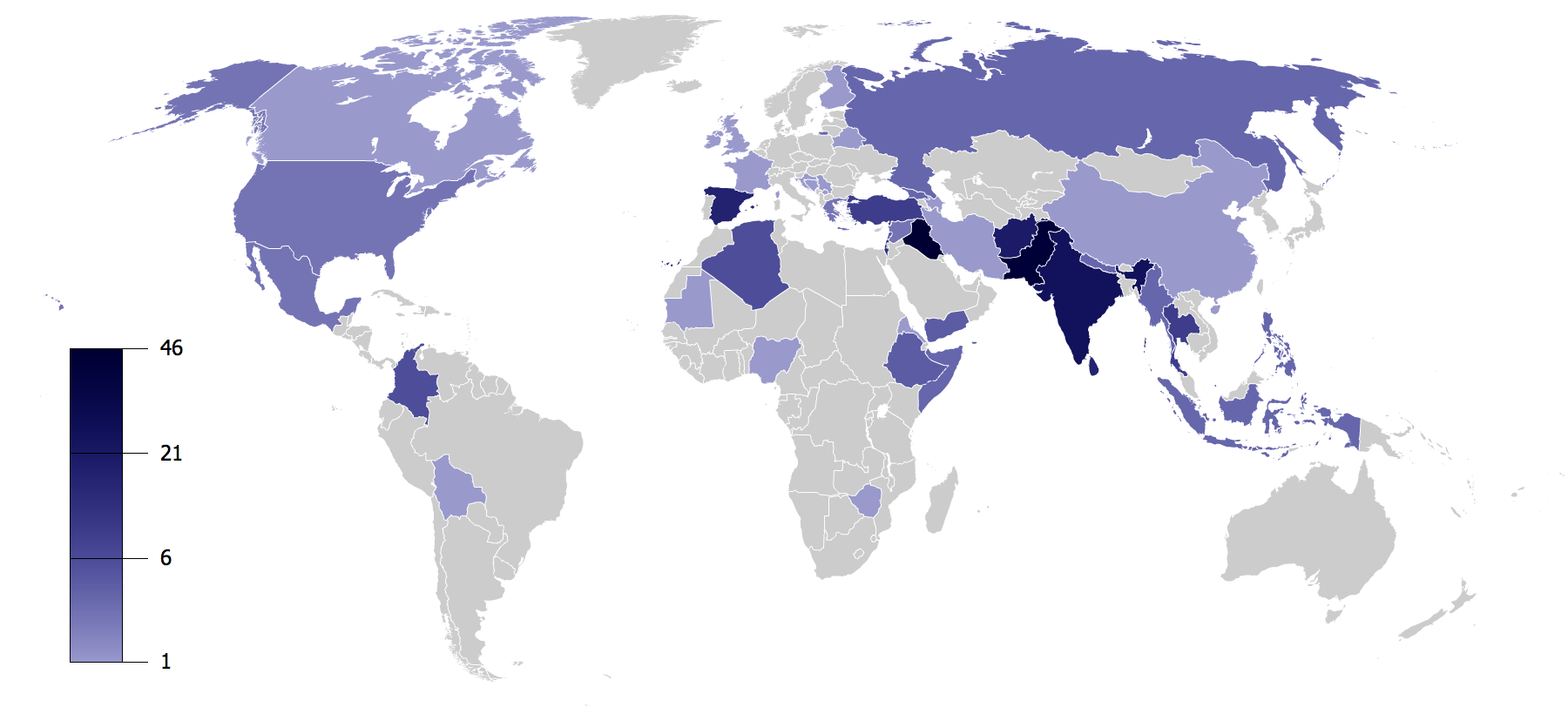
A map representing the number of terrorist incidents occurring across the world in 2008. The map shows that Iraq and Pakistan saw the greatest number of attacks

== January ==
- January 1: A suicide bomber killed more than 30 people and injured 32 in an attack in Baghdad. The blast was targeted at mourners at the funeral of a Shia army officer, Nabil Hussein Jassim, who had been killed by a car bombing in central Baghdad three days earlier.
- January 7: A double bombing in Baghdad killed at least 14 people, including Riyadh Samarrai, leader of the US-backed Adhamiya Awakening group, which fights al-Qaeda in Sunni areas of the city.
- January 16: A female suicide bomber blew herself up near a Shia mosque in the town of Khan Bani Saad Diyala, killing 11 others. Eighteen people were wounded in the attack, near a market in the town, south of Baqubah in the Diyala Governorate.
- January 24: A suicide bomber killed a high-ranking police chief and two other police officers in Mosul at the site of an explosion that had killed at least 34 people and wounded at least 217 the day before. Brigadier General Salah Mohammed al-Jubouri, the director of police for Ninawa Governorate, was inspecting the scene of Wednesday's blast when gunmen ambushed his convoy.

== February ==
- February 1: Two bombs exploded in Baghdad animal markets killing 99 people and wounding 200. The Iraqi government claimed that the bombs were carried by women and detonated remotely.
- February 24: A leader of a Sunni Awakening Council group, Sheikh Ibrahim Mutayri al-Mohammedi, was killed in a suicide bombing in Falluja.
- February 25: A man in a wheelchair blew himself up in a northern Iraqi police station, killing three National Police officers, including a commander.

== March ==
- March 3: A pair of car bombings targeting Iraqi security forces killed at least 18 people and wounded dozens in Baghdad.
- March 6: Fifty-three people were killed and 125 were wounded in two bomb attacks in a Baghdad commercial district.
- March 10: A suicide bomber struck in central Baghdad killing 5 American soldiers on foot patrol, 3 other soldiers and an Iraqi interpreter were wounded in the Blast.
- March 13: An Iraqi woman detonated a suicide vest in a small crowd in the Kirkuk Province killing two Iraqi citizens and wounding six. One Soldier who sustained minor wounds was treated at the scene
- March 17: A female suicide bomber apparently targeting Shiite worshippers killed at least 40 people and wounded at least 65 in Karbala.
- March 19: In Baquba, five people were killed and 16 wounded when a suicide bomber detonated his explosives belt in a public market. Another suicide bomb wounded 11 Iraqi soldiers and 3 civilians in Mosul.
- March 22: A roadside bomb blast struck an Iraqi police patrol in Kirkuk, killing a civilian and wounding nine people.
- March 23: 13 Iraqi soldiers were killed by a suicide bomber who drove a fuel tanker into an army base in Mosul and at least 40 people were injured.
- March 27: A car bomb explosion killed three people and wounded five others near a police patrol in central Baghdad.
- March 31: A suicide car bomber killed 5 US backed Sunni fighters at a checkpoint in Siniya, at least eight other people were injured.

== April ==
- April 3: A suicide bomber attacked a checkpoint near Mosul, killing 7 people and wounding 12 (the US military claims 5 killed and 19 injured).
- April 4: A suicide bomber killed at least 15 people in an attack on the funeral for a Sunni policeman in the province of Diyala, in the town of Saadiyah.
- April 11: Suicide bombings killed at least four people—three of them police. The first bombing was in Ramadi, the provincial capital of the predominantly Sunni Anbar province. At least three national police officers were killed. The second attack took place at a checkpoint about 20 km north of Baiji, the bomber and one other person a local Awakening Council were killed. Also, at least three people were killed in a mortar attack on Baghdad's Palestine Hotel.
- April 14: Three people died in the nearby city of Tal Afar when a suicide attacker blew himself up at an Iraqi soldier's funeral.
- April 15: A wave of bombings blamed on Al-Qaeda in Iraq-jihadists shook Baghdad, Baquba, Ramadi and Mosul, killing at least 60 people. Nonetheless, the overall violence in Baquba has decreased by 80% since June 2007. In Baquba, as many as 40 people were killed and at least 75 more were wounded during a car bombing near the courthouse. A suicide bomber killed 15 people and injured 13 more outside a kebab restaurant in Ramadi. Five policemen were killed and four more were wounded during a suicide bombing at a checkpoint in the Hamidiya area of Ramadi. In Mosul, a double car bombing killed three people and wounded at least 16 people. In Baghdad, a car bomb targeting a police patrol killed four people and wounded 15 in a central neighborhood.
- April 17: A suicide bomber killed at least 15 people and wounded many others in a suicide attack on a crowd of mourners in Baquba, during the funeral of two members of a local group who had died fighting al-Qaeda in Iraq militants.
- April 18: A suicide bomber attacked a U.S. military patrol near Tikrit killing 1 US soldier and wounding 4 others.
- April 21: A female suicide bomber attacked a U.S.-allied militia post, killing four people and wounding five others in Baquba.
- April 22: A female suicide bomber killed six people and wounded a dozen others when she blew herself up north of Baghdad according to Iraqi police. A suicide car bomber at a checkpoint near Ramadi killed 2 U.S. Marines and wounded 3 more. Two policemen and 24 civilians were also wounded. A second car bombing, this one at a police station in the city, wounded 20 people, including women and policemen. In Jalawla, a female suicide bomber killed eight people and wounded 17 at a police station.
- April 26: A series of co-ordinated bomb attacks has killed at least seven people and injured more than 20 in the northern Iraqi city of Mosul.
- April 29: At least 9 people were killed and were 23 wounded in a bomb attack in central Baghdad, Iraqi police say.

== May ==
- May 1: At least 35 people have been killed in a double suicide bombing in the Iraqi province of Diyala, officials say. At least 76 other people are said to have been injured.
- May 14: A suicide bomber killed 20 people and wounded dozens more when he blew himself up at a funeral west of Baghdad on Wednesday, there was no claim for responsibility but Iraqi police suspect al-Qaeda in Iraq. A teen aged girl blew herself up outside an Iraqi army post south of Baghdad on Wednesday, killing one soldier, the U.S. military said.
- May 17: A female suicide bomber targeted a US-backed militia office in Baquba, killing one woman and wounding 16.
- May 26: A suicide bomber on a motorcycle struck a checkpoint guarded by Iraqi police and US-backed Sunni militia, killing four people including a policeman, two awakening council guards and a civilian.
- May 27: A car bombing in the city of Talafer, some 70 km west of Mosul, killed 4 people and injured 46.
- May 29: A suicide bomber killed 14 police recruits and two policemen in northern Iraq. 17 others were killed and 80 were wounded in suicide bombings that day.

== June ==
- June 1: At least two people were killed and five others wounded in a car bomb explosion at a parking lot near the Iranian embassy in central Baghdad.
- June 2: A suicide bomber killed at least five policemen and four civilians in the northern Iraqi city of Mosul and wounded 46. Also 1 US soldier was killed and 4 wounded when a suicide car bomber targeted their check point near Fallujah.
- June 4: A suicide bomber drove a truck towards the house of police Brigadier-General Nadhim Taeih, in northern Baghdad, killing at least 13 people and wounding 50.

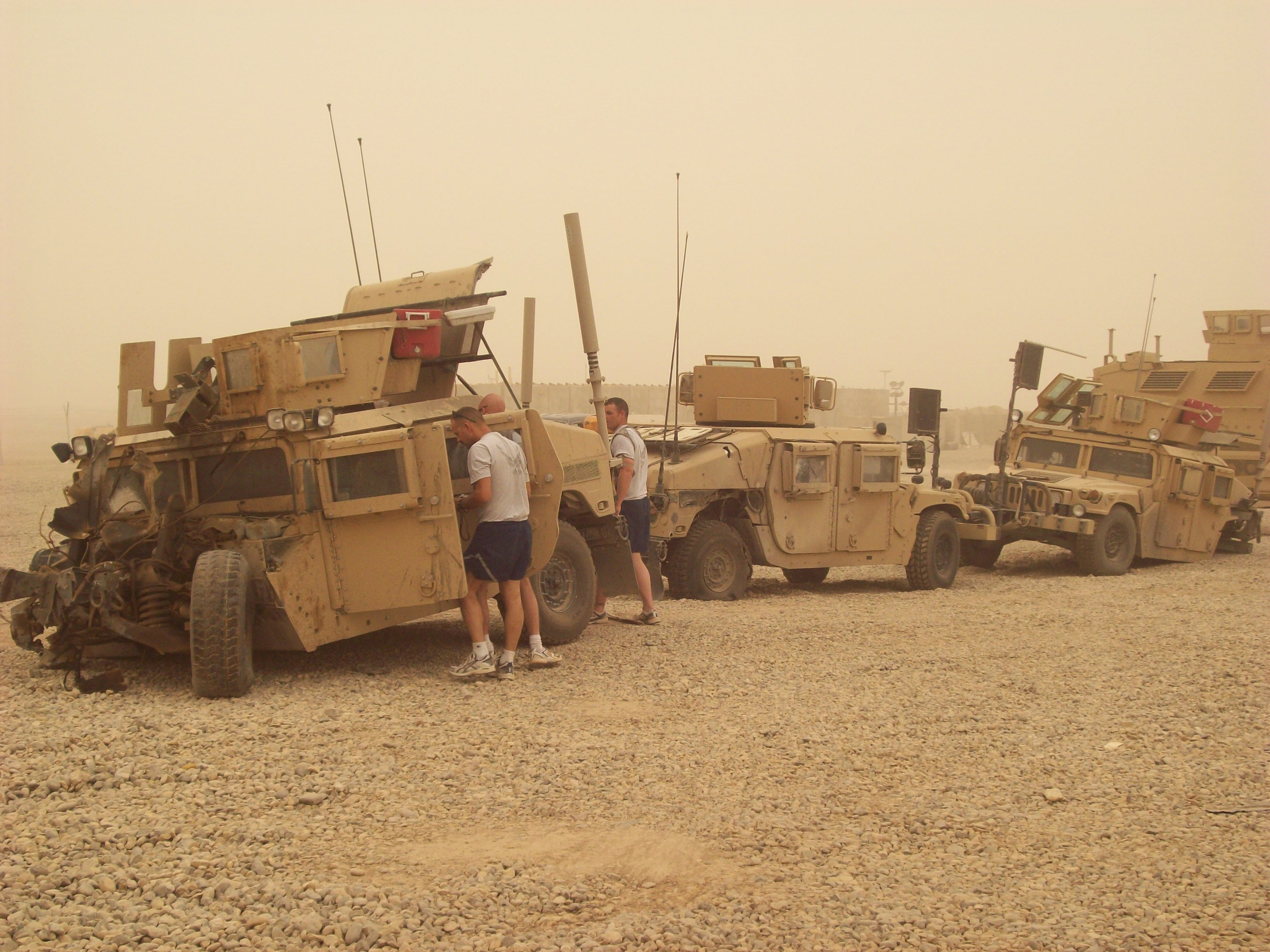

- June 7: An Air Force convoy was struck by three separate Russian 152 mm artillery rounds east of Baghdad on ASR Detroit. Out of the 10 Airmen involved, five received purple hearts. The USAF RED HORSE unit remained engaged in combat for over 12 hours receiving support from Army Apache's, M109 Howitzers, and the mobilization of FOB Hammer to recover the crippled convoy. The USAF noted this incident to be the greatest combined monetary loss of convoy equipment in the branches short history.
- June 7: A suicide car bomb and another car packed with explosives targeted Iraqi police patrols Saturday on opposite sides of Baghdad, killing at least six people.
- June 8: A suicide bomber blew himself up near a patrol base killing one U.S. soldier, wounding 18 others in al-Rashad, 15 miles southwest of the city of Kirkuk.
- June 9: A car bomb, targeting an Iraqi police checkpoint near a shopping centre in Baghdad's district of Karada killed 1 policeman, 4 civilians and injured 10 people. Bombings in Diyala killed 1 and injured 7.
- June 10: The head of Saddam Hussein's tribe was blown up in a car bomb explosion in the town of Al-Awja.
- June 15: In Mosul, a suicide car bombing killed a policeman and wounded six people.
- June 17: A car bomb explosion at a busy bus stop in northern Baghdad killed 51 people and injured 75. The Death toll later went up to 63.
- June 20: A suicide car bomb attacked a police checkpoint in Iraq's northern city of Mosul, killing 5 policemen.
- June 22: At least 15 people were killed by a female suicide bomber in the northern Iraqi city of Baquba. The attack was blamed on al-Qaeda.
- June 24: An overnight suicide car bomb explosion near a police station in the city of Mosul, the capital of Nineveh province, killed two people and wounded more than 70 others.
- June 25: Iraqi police say a suicide bomber has detonated an explosive belt inside the municipal council headquarters in a town west of Baghdad during a meeting of tribal sheikhs, at least seven people were killed in the blast, including some sheikhs and the town's administrative director.
- June 26: At least 38 people were killed in two massive bomb attacks, 20 of them were killed by a suicide bomber as they held an anti-al Qaeda meeting. The other 18 were killed in a car-bombing in Mosul, which also injured 80.
- June 27: In al-Anbar province a suicide bombing killed 3 U.S. soldiers and injured another 2, including 20 people and anti-al Qaeda Sheikhs. al-Qaeda in Iraq later claimed responsibility.
- June 29:A suicide car bomber killed seven policemen and wounded three in an attack on a patrol in northern Iraq's Salahuddin province.

== July ==
- July 1: A car bomb hit an Iraqi police patrol in the city of Mosul, the capital of Nineveh province, killing a civilian and injuring six.
- July 6: A car bomb killed 4 and wounded 16 in Baghdad. Later the death toll rose to 6 killed (and 14 wounded).
- July 7: A female suicide bomber kills 9 and injures 12 in Baquba.
- July 8: Two car bombings in Fallujah kill 3 policemen and a civilian.
- July 9: A suicide car bomber in targeting soldiers in northern Iraq on Wednesday killed five civilians and wounded 21.
- July 10: A suicide car bomb attacked an Iraqi army patrol in western Baghdad on Thursday, killing two civilians and wounding 13 people.
- July 15: At least five people were killed and 54 others wounded in a suicide attack near an Iraqi army base north of Baghdad. In Baquba there were 2 suicide bombings and in total 23 people were killed and 70 injured. The bombings targeted Iraqi Army recruits. Later the death toll there rose to 28 people killed (and 64 injured) A car-bombing in Mosul wounded 6 people.
- July 16: In Mosul a car bomb killed 16 and wounded 94.
- July 18: A suicide car bomb struck an Iraqi army patrol in Nineveh province on Friday, killing three soldiers and injuring seven others, a provincial police source said.
- July 24: Iraqi police say at least eight people have been killed in a suicide bombing at a checkpoint defended by U.S.-allied Sunni guards northeast of Baghdad.
- July 27: A car bomb on Sunday wounded a Sunni political leader and his son and killed two of his bodyguards.
- July 28: Three suicide bombers struck a Shiite pilgrimage in Baghdad and a Kurdish protest rally in northern Iraq, killing at least 57 people and wounding nearly 300.
- July 31: A suicide car bomber rammed an explosives-laden vehicle into the wall of a police station near Mosul, killing three policemen and wounding four.

== August ==
- August 3: A series of bomb attacks in Baghdad early on Sunday killed 12 people and wounded at least 31, government sources said.
- August 12: Two Iraqis were killed and at least six others wounded when a female suicide bomber struck a convoy carrying senior Iraqi officials in Baquba.
- August 13: A suicide truck bomber targeted the mayor of a town near the oil-rich city of Kirkuk on Wednesday, while another car bomb struck civilians elsewhere in northern Iraq, two people were killed.
- August 17: A suicide bomber killed at least 15 people and wounded 29 near a mosque in a mainly Sunni part of the Iraqi capital Baghdad.
- August 24: A suicide bomber has blown himself up at a car dealership in the northern Iraqi city of Kirkuk, killing at least five people and wounding nine.
- August 25: At least 21 people were killed in a suicide bomb attack in Abu Ghraib district of Baghdad. Around 32 people, including women and children, were injured in the attack.

== September ==
- September 1: A suicide car bomber on Tuesday struck an Iraqi army checkpoint in the city of Mosul, the capital of Nineveh province, killing seven people and wounding seven others.
- September 6: Six people were killed in a suicide car bomb attack on Iraqi deputy prime minister Ahmad Chalabi's convoy in western Baghdad. 50 people were wounded
- September 12: At least 27 Iraqis were killed and about 40 others wounded in a suicide bombing targeting a police station in northern province of Salahuddin. At least 28 people have been killed in a suicide car bombing in a town north of Baghdad. The blast targeted a police station in the commercial district of the mainly Shia town of Dujail. At least 40 others were injured in the explosion. A suicide bomber blew himself up in front of a Shiite mosque in northern Iraq as worshippers left prayers at midday on Friday, killing two civilians and wounding 15.
- September 15: At least 12 people were killed and 36 injured when two car bombs exploded in quick succession in central Baghdad. In Diyala 20 were killed and 30 wounded when a woman suicide bomber blew herself up.
- September 17: Two car bombs exploded in quick succession, killing eight people and wounding 25 others in western Baghdad's Harithiya district.
- September 24: One U.S. soldier was killed by a suicide bomber while conducting operations in Jisr Naft, Diyala province.
- September 28: At least 12 people were killed and dozens more wounded in 2 car bombings in a western Baghdad.

== October ==
- October 2: Suicide bombers struck Shi'a worshippers as they gathered for prayers at two mosques in Baghdad to celebrate the Muslim Eid al-Fitr feast, killing 16 people and wounding nearly 60.
- October 8: A woman suicide bomber blew herself up at an entrance of an Iraqi court in the city of Baquba, killing 6 and wounding 18.
- October 9: A suicide bomber killed three policeman and wounded eight more at a station in Habbaniya.
- October 12: At least nine people were killed and 13 wounded in a car bombing at a market in Baghdad.
- October 13: Suicide car bombers struck twice yesterday in the northern city of Mosul, killing at least six people and wounding dozens of others. In Balad a suicide bomber wounded 3 policemen.
- October 17: Iraqi officials say bomb near north Baghdad mosque kills 3 Shiite worshippers.
- October 22: A car bombing by al-Qaeda killed four people and wounded three in Mosul.
- October 23: 9 people were killed and 20 injured when a suicide bombing targeted a convoy carrying Iraqi minister Mahmoud Jawad al-Radi, in Baghdad. al-Radi himself remained unharmed. Later the death toll rose to 11 killed and 22 injured.

== November ==
- November 5: 4 Iraqis were killed and 10 injured in a suicide car-bombing at a checkpoint near Baghdad Airport.
- November 8: In West of Baghdad, a suicide bomber killed eight people and wounded 17 more at a police checkpoint near the former Sunni insurgent stronghold of Ramadi in Anbar province.
- November 10: 25 people were killed and 48 injured during a suicide bombing and a car-bombing in Baghdad.
- November 15: A suicide car bombing near a car dealership killed 11 Iraqis and wounded 36 in the northern city of Tal Afar.
- November 16: A suicide car bombing killed 14 people and wounded 20 others Sunday in the town of Jalawla.
- November 24: A female suicide bomber killed 5 people outside Baghdad's Green Zone compound.
- November 28: A suicide bombing attack killed at least 8 people and wounded 15 at a Shiite mosque in Baghdad.

== December ==
- December 1: A car bombing and suicide vest bombing targeting a police academy in eastern Baghdad Monday killed at least 16 people and wounded 46 others.
- December 2: 5 people (including a policeman) were killed and 30 (including 4 Security Forces) were injured in a suicide bombing in Tal Afar.
- December 3: A double suicide car bomb attacks struck two police stations in the city of Fallujah, in Anbar province, killing 15 and wounding 147. The death toll later rise to 17.
- December 4: 2 U.S. soldiers were killed and 9 Iraqis wounded when a suicide car bomb exploded in the northern city of Mosul.
- December 6: A suicide bomber blew himself up at a crowd of police recruits outside a police academy in Iraq's northern oil-rich city of Kirkuk, killing a police recruit and wounding 15 others.
- December 11: A suicide bombing in a Kirkuk restaurant killed at least 61 people, wounding 75.
- December 14: A woman suicide bomber on Monday killed an Awakening Council group leader at the front door of his house in a town north of Baghdad.
- December 15: At least 9 policemen were killed and up to 31 others wounded in a suicide car bomb attack on an Iraqi security checkpoint in a town west of Baghdad.
- December 25: A car bomb outside a restaurant in Baghdad killed four persons and wounded 25 others.
- December 27: A car bomb killed at least 22 people and wounded 54 more when it exploded at a Baghdad bus station.
- December 28: A suicide bomber on a bicycle blew himself up amid a crowd of demonstrators in northern Iraq who were protesting Israel's airstrikes on Gaza, killing 1 demonstrator and wounding 16. Sunni Iraqi Islamic Party spokesman Yahiya Abid Majhoub stated: "The ones who targeted our brothers in Gaza are the same who targeted us in Mosul today. They are agents of Israel"

== See also ==
- List of bombings during the Iraq War
- List of terrorist incidents in 2008
