= 19 January 2005 Baghdad bombings =

Terrorist incident in Iraq

During the morning of 19 January 2005, four car bombings occurred in Baghdad, Iraq. The attacks killed at least 27 people. A group led by Jordanian militant Abu Musab al-Zarqawi, Emir of Al-Qaeda in Iraq, claimed responsibility for the attack on behalf of Al-Qaeda.

== Attack ==
The first vehicle bomb detonated at around 7:00 am near the Australian embassy in Jadiriyah, central Baghdad upon ramming sand barriers and concrete blast walls outside the Australian military security detachment which guards the embassy. Two Iraqis were killed in the blast and at least eight others were injured including two Australian soldiers.

The second bomb exploded at around 7:30 am at a police station in Elwiya, eastern Baghdad. It killed 18 people, including five Iraqi Police officer and injured 36 other people. The third bomb exploded near Baghdad International Airport, at the headquarters of the Iraqi National Guard located at the southern gate of the former al-Muthanna airport, killing two Iraqi security guards. The fourth bomb exploded at a military complex, killing two civilians and two Iraqi soldiers.

== See also ==
- Iraq War insurgent attacks
- List of terrorist incidents in 2005
- Australia in the Iraq War
