= 2009 Tal Afar bombing =

Suicide bombing in Tal Afar, Iraq

9 July 2009 Tal Afar bombing
- Location: 36.3742°N 42.4606°E
- Date: 9 July 2009
- Attack type: Bombing
- Weapon: Explosives
- Deaths: 34
- Injuries: 60
- Perpetrator: Unknown

The 9 July 2009 Tal Afar bombing was a double suicide bombing which occurred in Tal Afar, Iraq in July 2009. The bombing occurred when two men detonated explosive vests.

The attacks targeted the Governor of the Iraqi Central Bank. However, he was unhurt in the incident. Thirty four people were killed and more than 60 were injured.

== See also ==
- List of bombings during the Iraq War
