= 2011 Faisalabad bombing =

Terrorist bombing in 2011 in Pakistan

Coordinates: 31°15′N 73°03′E

- Location: Faisalabad, Punjab, Pakistan
- Date: 8 March 2011
- Attack type: Car bombing
- Deaths: 25+
- Injuries: 127+
- Perpetrator: Tehrik-i-Taliban Pakistan
- Motive: Islamic terrorism

The 2011 Faisalabad bombing occurred on 8 March 2011 in Faisalabad, Punjab, Pakistan. At least 25 people were killed and over 127 wounded when a car bombing occurred at a compressed natural gas station in Faisalabad. The internationally designated terrorist group Tehrik-i-Taliban Pakistan claimed responsibility for the bombing.

== Background ==
Faisalabad is the third most populous city in Pakistan and an important industrial hub of the Punjab province; the attack was the first of its kind in the area, which had largely remained safe from terrorist attacks. Many textile companies are based in Faisalabad. Pro-Taliban militant groups had been gaining strength in the area, which had previously witnessed sectarian violence.

== Attack ==
The car bomb exploded at a compressed natural gas station at about 10:30 am, leaving a 7-foot deep by 15-foot wide crater. According to local officials, a Toyota Corolla packed with 40 kilograms of explosives was used in the attack.

The vicinity where the attack took place was a sensitive area, surrounded by Inter-Services Intelligence (ISI) and military offices. A Pakistan International Airlines building and an ISI building were damaged in the bombing. The bomb caused several gas cylinders to explode and damaged several vehicles and buildings.

The gas station was reduced to a pile of bricks and twisted metal. Rescue officials used heavy machinery and cranes to remove rubble from the scene to search for survivors. Among the dead were an ISI officer and a schoolteacher.

== Responsibility ==
A spokesman for Tehrik-i-Taliban Pakistan stated that the bombing, which targeted an ISI building, was in retaliation for the killing of Omar Kundi, a Taliban commander, by special forces in Faisalabad in 2010.

== See also ==
- List of armed conflicts and attacks, 2011
- List of terrorist incidents in Pakistan since 2001
- War in North-West Pakistan
- Terrorism in Pakistan
