= 2011 Al Diwaniyah bombing =

Suicide bombing in Al Diwaniyah, Iraq

21 June 2011 Al Diwaniyah bombing
- Location: Al Diwaniyah, Iraq
- Date: 21 June 2011; 7:30–8:00am local time – (UTC+3)
- Target: Provincial governor (possibly)
- Attack type: Suicide bombing, attempted assassination
- Deaths: 27+
- Injuries: 30+
- Perpetrator: Islamic State of Iraq

The 21 June 2011 Al Diwaniyah bombing was a suicide bombing that occurred outside the provincial governor's house. It is believed he was the intended target. He survived the attack, however at least 27 people were killed, and over 30 wounded in the attack.

== Attack ==
The attack occurred at approximately 7:30 am local time when a suicide bomber blew himself up outside the governor's house. The second attack is believed to have happened a short time later as emergency services arrived at the area.

The attack occurred during the morning switch-over of security personnel. As a result, the majority of casualties in the blast were that of security personal to the governor. It is believed the governor himself was not harmed in the attack. It is the first major attack in the city, since 2009 when a bomb attached to a bus killed six people and 2007 when a roadside bomb targeted a police patrol, killing seven officers.

== Aftermath ==
The attacks led to further debate, especially among the top political factions in Iraq, as to whether the United States should remain in Iraq for security purposes, as despite the fact many feel that the violence has reduced in recent times, many are worried about the situation once the U.S pulls its final troops out of the country on 31 December 2011.

== See also ==
- List of terrorist incidents, 2011
- Iraq War insurgent attacks
