= Abdullah Hussein Jebara =

Iraqi politician

- عبدالله حسين جبارة
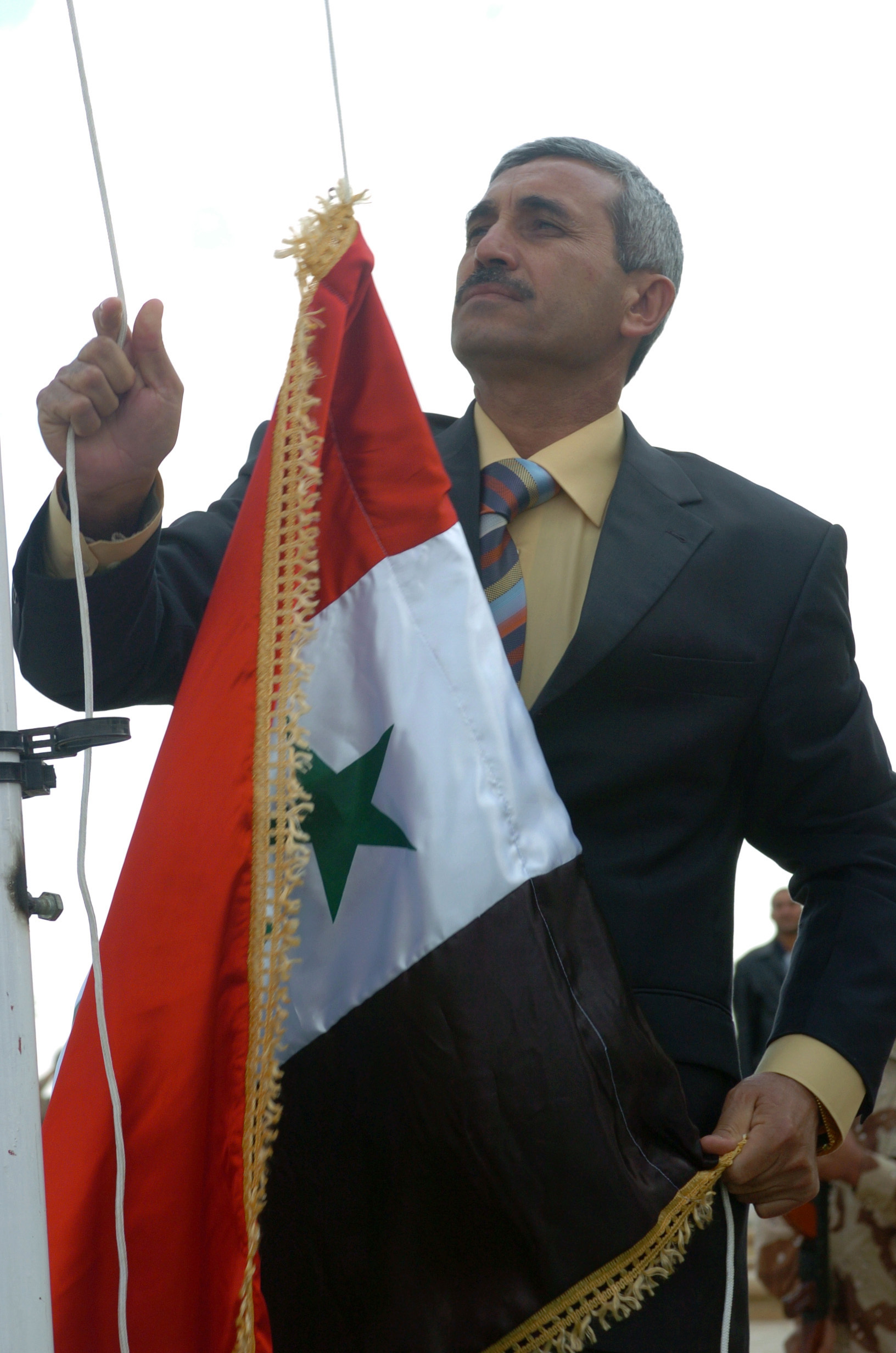
- Jebara in Tikrit in 2005.

Deputy Governor of Saladin
- In office 2004–2009 Serving with Qahtan Hamada Saleh
- Governor: Hamed Hamood Shekti al-Qaisi
- Succeeded by: Ahmed Abed al-Jabar Ali Kareem

Personal details
- Born: 1 July 1957 al-Alam, Tikrit, Saladin, Iraq
- Died: 29 March 2011 (aged 53) Tikrit, Iraq
- Party: Coalition for Iraqi National Unity; Ba'ath Party (until 2003)
- Education: University of Madras
- Occupation: Politician

Military service
- Allegiance: Ba'athist Iraq
- Branch/service: Iraqi Army
- Years of service: 1975–2003
- Rank: Brigadier General
- Battles/wars: Iran-Iraq War; Gulf War; Invasion of Iraq

Abdullah Hussein Mohammed Jebara al-Jubouri (Arabic: عبدالله حسين جبارة; 1 July 1957 – 29 March 2011) was an Iraqi politician and former soldier who served as the Deputy Governor of Saladin province between 2004 and 2009.

== Early life ==
Jebara was born on 1 July 1957 in the town of al-Alam, to the North East of Tikrit. He graduated from secondary school in 1975.

== Military career ==
After graduating from secondary school Jebara joined the army, and entering into the Iraqi Military Academy, from which he graduated in 1979 as a Lieutenant in an armored unit. During his military career Jebara participated in every war involving Iraq. During his career Jebara was also wounded several times, including being shot three times.

Jebara entered the Iraqi Staff college in 1987, graduating in 1989. During this period he also studied at the University of Madras, graduating with a master's degree (with honors) in political science in 1991.

He later attended the War College, graduating with honors in 2000. Following this he held several positions, including commanding an armored battalion, an armored brigade, and later went on to teach at the War College.

During the Saddam era Jebara also held a high-level position in the Ba'ath party, holding the rank of Firqa, equivalent to a branch chief. He also served in the Iraqi Army, and was a Deputy Division Commander during the 2003 Invasion of Iraq, with the rank of Brigadier General. Following the invasion Jebara was arrested by Coalition Forces, however he was released within 24 hours due to the intervention of a relative.

== Political career ==
Following the overthrow of the Ba'athist government of Iraq Jebara began working with the Coalition Forces. He initially began working as an interpreter for Coalition Forces in 2003, although quickly moved into governance. He was known for playing a critical role in convincing Sunni Arabs in Saladin to work with the Coalition instead of turning towards violence, and a 2008 diplomatic cable referred to him as potentially the most powerful person in the province, due in part to individuals with whom he had close connections, familial or otherwise, also holding powerful positions in the Saladin provincial government.

Jebara campaigned on behalf of the No Vote during the 2005 Iraqi constitutional referendum. Jebara did so claiming that the referendum would be the start of the division of Iraq, and would result in the squandering of Iraq's oil wealth.

Following the execution of Saddam Hussein, Jebara brought Saddam's body back to Tikrit for burial.

Jebara was allegedly involved in a campaign to intimidate political rivals. In early 2008 members of the Arab National Bloc and the National Movement for Development and Reform in Saladin accused Jebara and Major Ahmed Fahal, the head of the Saladin Police Department Counterterrorism Unit, of political harassment. The two were accused of shutting offices belonging to the parties without warning, detaining office guards, and verbally threatening party members. The alleged reasoning was because of the ANB's reputed links with the PUK, and al-Haq's reputed connections to Iran.

During this time Jebara became known as a vocal critic of al-Qaeda.

== Death ==
Jebara was killed by al-Qaeda during the 2011 Tikrit assault. During the assault some 56 people were killed. The dead included Jebara, along with 2 other councillors. All three were executed by al-Qaeda by means of gunshots to the head, and their bodies were then burnt.

== Personal life ==
Jebara was a member of the Jabouri tribe.

Jebara's younger brother, Colonel Jasim Hussein Jebara, served as director of National Security for Saladin Province. His older brother, was the top Sheikh of the Juabouri tribe in Saladin governorate.
