= June 2009 Muraidi Market bombing =

Terrorist action in Baghdad, Iraq

Muraidi Market bombing
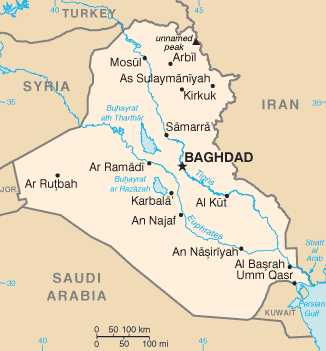
- The attack occurred in Baghdad, Iraq.
- Location: 33°23′27.45″N 44°27′36.43″E; Muraidi Market, Sadr City, Baghdad, Iraq
- Date: 24 June 2009
- Attack type: Bombing
- Weapon: Explosives
- Deaths: 69
- Injuries: 150
- Perpetrator: Unknown

On 24 June 2009, a bombing occurred in the Muraidi Market of Sadr City in Baghdad, Iraq. At least 69 people were killed and 150 others injured. An official said that the explosion was caused by a bomb hidden underneath a motorised vegetable cart in the market, as reported by the BBC and CNN. As reported by The New York Times, the Iraqi Interior Ministry said that it was caused by a bomb attached to a motorcycle. Shrapnel from the bomb injured people 600 metres (660 yd) away from the explosion. Civilians tried to help the injured following the explosion, until security forces forced them back to allow emergency services to enter the market. The Iraqi Army, the Iraqi government, the American military and Iraqi political parties were held responsible for the bombing by the witnesses and relatives of the wounded. Politicians affiliated with Muqtada al-Sadr accused the 11th Brigade of the Iraqi Army, which is responsible for Sadr City, for the attack. These politicians also said that the American military was partly to blame, because they brought the 11th Brigade to the neighbourhood.

== Political statements ==
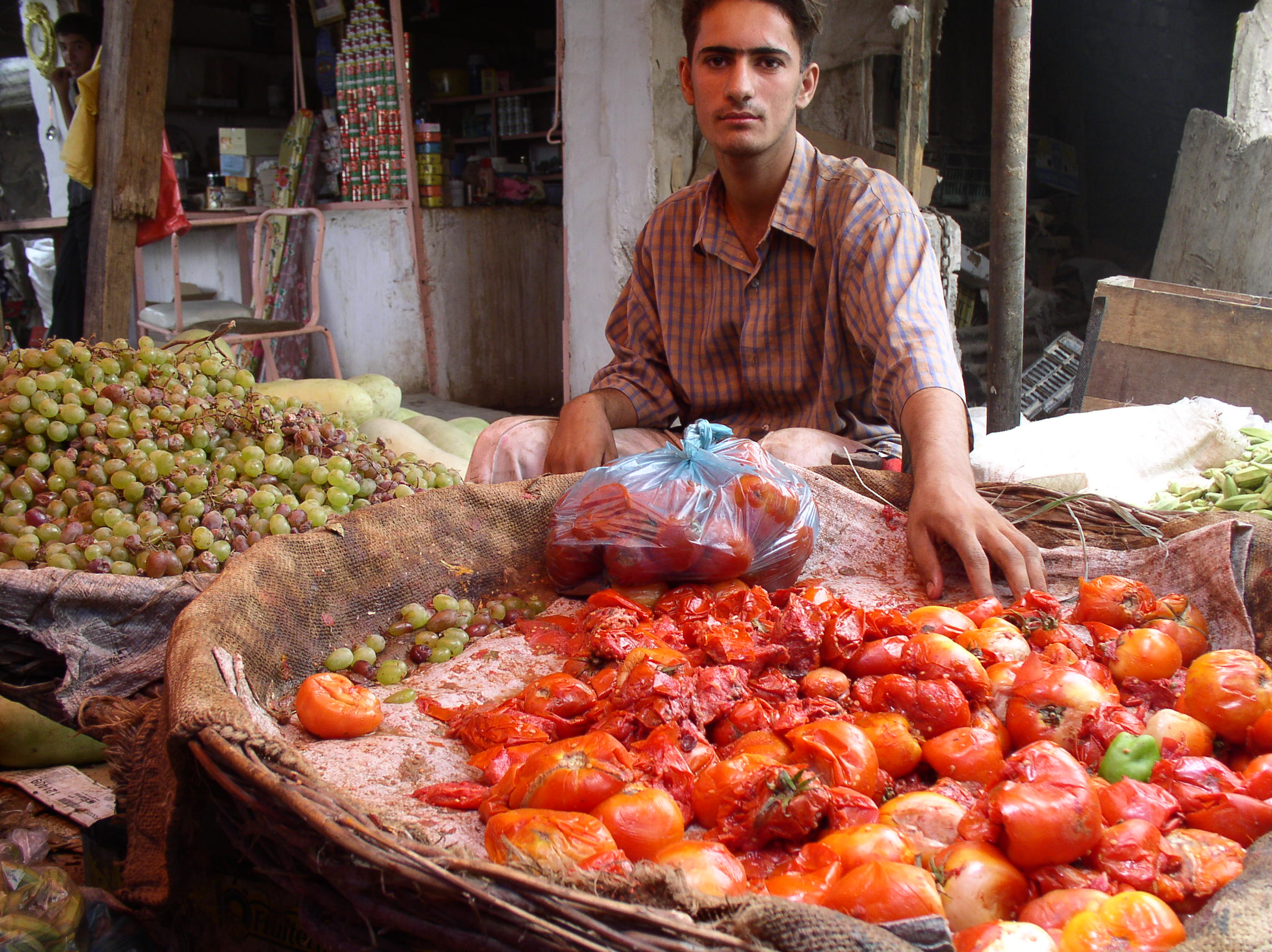
The marketplace

Ahmed al-Masoudi, a member of Parliament, stated "how come the Muraidi Market that is surrounded by blast walls and no vehicle or motorcycle can go inside but they allowed in this motorcycle?... The 11th Brigade is directly involved in these crimes, these murders."

== Other attacks on 24 June 2009 ==
- In Baghdad, one person was killed and 10 were wounded in the Sunni community of Hay al Jihad in western Baghdad. A bomb was hidden in a plastic bag outside a coffee shop and detonated.
- A roadside bomb in Saadiya neighbourhood, southwestern Baghdad, wounded four people.

== See also ==
- List of bombings during the Iraq War
