= Terrorist incidents in Iraq in 2015 =

This article lists terrorist incidents in Iraq in 2015.

Bombings and other atrocities were a daily event, as the country was in a state of war.

== January ==
- January 1: 15 members of the Jamilat tribe were executed after refusing to join ISIL.

== February ==
- February 7–9: Baghdad bombings

== June ==
- June 23: Suicide bombing kills two soldiers, injures 8 others in southwest of Ramadi
- June 27: ten people killed in a "routine" bombing.

== July ==
- July 17: Khan Bani Saad bombing

== August ==
- August 13: Baghdad bombing

== October ==
- October 3: At least 18 people were killed and more than 60 wounded in twin suicide bombings in Baghdad.

== November ==
- November 13: 26 people died as a result of a terrorist attack in Baghdad.

== See also ==
- List of terrorist incidents, 2015
- Terrorist incidents in Iraq in 2016
- Terrorist incidents in Iraq in 2014
- Terrorist incidents in Iraq in 2013
- List of bombings during the Iraq War
