= 25 August 2010 Iraq bombings =

- Part of Iraqi insurgency (2003–2011)
- Location: Across Iraq
- Date: 25 August 2010 (UTC+3)
- Target: Mostly security services and checkpoints
- Attack type: Suicide bombings, Car bombings, and IEDs
- Deaths: 53+
- Injuries: 270+
- Perpetrator: Islamic State of Iraq

On 25 August 2010, a string of attacks in Iraqi cities including Al-Muqdadiya, Kut, Baghdad, Fallujah, Tikrit, Kerbala, Kirkuk, Basra, Ramadi, Dujail, Mosul and Iskandariyah targeting mostly Iraqi security forces and checkpoints left at least 53 people dead and more than 270 injured.

== Background ==
Following terms agreed to in the Status of Forces Agreement between the United States and Iraq, American combat forces were withdrawn from the country leaving less than 50,000 troops in the country. This was the lowest foreign troop count in the country since the 2003 Iraq War. There were concerns that the drawdown could lead to a rise in Al Qaeda-linked attacks. A scheduled speech by U.S. President Barack Obama will take note of the withdrawal of U.S. forces on the planned date of 31 August; the next day the U.S. mission will officially be renamed 'Operation New Dawn' from 'Operation Iraqi Freedom' in a ceremony at a U.S. base near the Baghdad airport.

The attacks also came amid concern that the 2010 Iraqi general election was so inconclusive that a new government had not yet formed nearly six months after 7 March 2010 election date.

Most insurgents are Sunnis, whereas the majority of the population, including the acting Prime Minister, are Shias. Quoting what it called a "prominent insurgent website" on the day of the attacks, The New York Times said the Sunni insurgents stated that "the countdown has begun to return Iraq to the embrace of Islam and its Sunnis, with God’s permission."

== Attacks ==
The attacks were made in 13 cities and spanned the length of Iraq, from Mosul in the north to Basra in the far south of the country. The attacks demonstrated the ability of insurgents to make coordinated attacks across the country. The 25 August attacks included a full spectrum of types with over a dozen car bombs, hit-and-run shooting attacks and roadside bombs.

A list of the attacks included:

- In the southern city of Kut, a suicide car bomber killed at least 19 policemen and wounded 90.
- A car bomb also hit a police check-point in Ameiriya wounding three people.
- In Kerbala, at least one person was killed and 29 people were wounded when a car bomb went off near a police station.
- In Kirkuk, one person died and another eight were wounded by a bomb attack.
- A parked minibus packed with explosives blew up near a police station in the southern oil hub city of Basra, wounding 12 people.
- A car bomb struck a bus station in Ramadi, killing 3 policemen and wounding 9 civilians.
- Car bombs in Dujail, Mosul and Iskandariyah killed 5 and wounded 21.

== Responsibility ==
The Iraqi political leadership alleged that Al Qaeda and the remnants of the Iraqi Baath party carried out the attacks. Islamic State of Iraq organization claimed responsibility for the attacks, saying that during "the month of fasting and jihad [we launched a] new earth-shaking wave [targeting] headquarters, centres and security barriers for the army and apostate police."

== Reaction ==
Iraqi prime minister, Nouri al-Maliki, issued a statement laying blame for the attacks. "Al-Qaeda in Iraq, and its allies from the Baath party, have once again committed an ugly crime against innocent civilians and the institutions of the state...to destabilise security and shake the confidence in the Iraqi security forces who are getting ready to take over security at the end of this month as the Americans withdraw."

== See also ==
- Terrorist incidents in Iraq in 2010
