= October 2011 Baghdad bombings =

Series of attacks in Baghdad

- Part of Iraqi insurgency
- Location: Baghdad, Iraq
- Date: 7–13 October 2011 (UTC+3)
- Target: Civilian population, Iraqi police
- Attack type: Shootings, Suicide bombings, Car bombs, IEDs
- Deaths: 64
- Injuries: 190
- Perpetrator: Islamic State of Iraq

The October 2011 Baghdad bombings were a series of bombing attacks that hit the capital of Iraq between 7 and 13 October 2011. The first attacks took place on 7 October when a magnetic bomb and two IED blasts killed 7 and injured 39 in the north and south districts of Baghdad. On 10 October three explosions hit the mainly Shia neighborhood of Washash, killing ten and injuring 18 more. Two days later a string of bombings and shootings took place all across the city - at least two police stations in the northwestern and central districts were attacked by suicide car bombers, killing 22 (including 13 policemen) and leaving at least 55 wounded. In total at least 29 people died on this day and 86 were injured. On the next evening four powerful roadside bombs exploded next to a local market and a crowded coffeeshop in the Sadr City district, killing 18 and injuring 47.

== See also ==
- List of terrorist incidents, 2011
