= 15 August 2011 Iraq attacks =

Series of terrorist attack

- Location: Baghdad, Kut, Tikrit, Najaf, Taji, Kirkuk, Mosul and others, Iraq
- Date: 15 August 2011 (UTC+3)
- Target: Civilian population, Iraqi Police & Army, government officials
- Attack type: Shootings, bombings, car bombs, IEDs, suicide bombings
- Deaths: 64
- Injuries: 287
- Perpetrator: Islamic State of Iraq

The 15 August 2011 Iraq attacks were a series of terrorist incidents that took place across Iraq. At least 37 were killed and 68 injured in Kut after a roadside bomb and a car bomb exploded in the center of the city. A string of bombings and shootings in the capital took the lives of two and left 27 wounded. Eight were killed and 14 injured in a suicide car bombings in Khan Bani Saad City. Two car bombs exploded in the Najaf, killing 6 and injuring 79, followed by another blast near Karbala that killed 4 and injured 41. Numerous other attacks throughout the central and northern parts of Iraq (including a double suicide bombing in Tikrit) left 7 dead and at least 58 wounded.

== See also ==
- List of terrorist incidents, 2011
