= 2004 Mosul bombings =

Car bombings in Iraq

24 June 2004 Mosul bombings
- Part of Iraqi insurgency (2003–2006) in Iraqi insurgency (2003–2011)
- Location: Mosul, Iraq
- Date: 24 June 2004 (UTC+3)
- Target: Four police stations and hospital
- Attack type: Car bombs
- Deaths: At least 62
- Injuries: At least 220

The 24 June 2004 Mosul bombings were a series of coordinated car bomb attacks in the northern Iraqi city of Mosul, where five car bombs targeted police stations and a city hospital killing at least 62 and injuring at least 220 people, many of them Iraqi policemen.
