= Murder of Khwanas Wirya =

2023 shooting in Kurdistan

Khwanas Wirya (Kurdish: خواناس وریا) was an Iraqi Kurdish theatre performer and artist who was murdered in the city of Chamchamal, Iraqi Kurdistan, on June 22, 2023.

== Background ==
Wirya (b. 2001) was an actor, athlete, and painter who grew up in Chamchamal. He left Iraq to work in the United Arab Emirates at a car garage. While living in the UAE, he left Islam and became a vocal critic of all religions. Wirya returned to Chamchamal in June 2023 to visit his family and friends.

== Murder and arrest ==
On 22 June, around 5:30pm, Wirya was shot 10 times in a crowded market by a motorcyclist who fled the scene.

Hersh Karim, aged 28, was arrested and was very compliant during his interrogation and confessed to the murder. Karim was an active duty soldier in the Peshmerga, specifically the PUK wing. After Wirya's killing, Karim posted on his Facebook taking pride in his actions. He also had posted many pictures of Mullah Halo, a famous Kurdish Salafi cleric. Mullah Halo denied any involvement in the murder.

Wirya's killing went viral and brought up discussions about the growth of radical views and Salafism among Kurds.
