= 2009 Baghdad police recruitment centre bombing =

Suspected suicide bombing

Baghdad police recruitment centre bombing
- Location: 33°20′39″N 44°26′9″E; Palestine Street, Baghdad, Iraq
- Date: 8 March 2009; 10:00 (UTC+3)
- Attack type: Suicide bombings
- Weapon: Explosives
- Deaths: 28
- Injuries: 57
- Perpetrator: 1–2 people per sources
- No. of participants: At least 1

The Baghdad police recruitment centre bombing was a suspected suicide bombing in the city of Baghdad, Iraq, that killed 28 people on 8 March 2009. The attack occurred at 10 am local time (UTC+3) in the centre of a crowd outside the police recruitment centre building. Most of the dead were police recruits; others were civilians and serving officers. There were a further 57 injuries. The death toll is the highest reported incident in Iraq for nearly one month.

Insurgents often choose police recruitment centres to attack and this centre located on Palestine Street, was previously attacked. Concrete blocks have been constructed and checkpoints have been set up nearby to prevent such an attack.

According to a nearby police lieutenant there was a demonstration of about 100 oil employees at one intersection between the police recruitment building and the oil ministry. The bomb went off one hour after the demonstration had started and according to some sources the bomber had mingled with the crowd. The police believe that the bomb was remotely detonated, despite speculation regarding a bomber committing suicide. There were reports of a second bomb. Some reports suggest a motorcycle crashed into the crowd and the rider detonated explosives in a worn belt. Other reports claim that the explosives were worn in a vest. An eye-witness said that the police started discharging their firearms after the explosion, leading to the widespread belief that the explosions were merely cover for targeted killings within the crowd. Pick-up trucks were used to transport the casualties to hospital afterwards.

== See also ==
- List of bombings during the Iraq War
