= 2007 Al Amarah bombings =

2007 terrorist incident in Iraq

- Location: Al Amarah, Iraq
- Date: December 13, 2007; 1100 (0800 GMT) (UTC+3)
- Attack type: car bombing, restaurant bombing
- Deaths: 46
- Injuries: 149
- Perpetrator: Unknown

The 2007 Al Amarah bombings occurred on December 13, 2007 when three simultaneous car bombs detonated in Al Amarah, Iraq, capital of Maysan province. The attack left 46 people dead and 149 others wounded.

The explosions hit Dijlah Street, a commercial thoroughfare, destroying shops and restaurants. According to witnesses the second car bomb, which was the most powerful of the three, blew up in front of Jalal Restaurant. As people were rushing to help the injured at the restaurant the third explosion occurred.
