= Abdullah restaurant bombing =

Afghan terrorist attack in 2008

The Abdullah restaurant bombing was a terrorist attack that was committed during the Iraq War on 11 December 2008. The attack involved a suicide bomber who blew himself up in a crowded restaurant outside of Kirkuk in Northern Iraq. The attack killed at least 55 people. At least 100 people were also injured in the blast.
