= 2011 Tikrit assault =

Attack by the Islamic State in Iraq

2011 Tikrit assault (29 March)
- Part of Islamic State of Iraq
- 2011 Tikrit assault (Iraq)
- Location: 34°35′48″N 43°40′37″E; Tikrit, Iraq
- Date: 29 March 2011; 1–6 p.m. (UTC+3; Arabia Standard Time (AST))
- Target: Tikrit politicians
- Attack type: shootings, bombings, suicide bombings, siege
- Weapons: guns, bombs, grenades, suicide belts
- Deaths: 65
- Injuries: 100
- Victims: politicians, citizens, journalists
- Perpetrator: 6–8 insurgents from Islamic State of Iraq

The 2011 Tikrit assault was an attack by the Islamic State of Iraq (ISI) organization that took place in the city of Tikrit, Iraq, on 29 March 2011, while the war was still ongoing. Reuters news agency included the attack in its list of deadliest attacks in 2011. ISI, which was then allied to al-Qaeda, claimed responsibility for killing 65 people and wounding over 100. At the time, the United States Armed Forces were withdrawing. Tikrit was Saddam Hussein's birthplace.

== Description of incident ==
On 29 March 2011, gunmen from the Islamic State of Iraq wearing suicide belts hidden under military uniforms entered Tikrit, Iraq. The men presented themselves as Iraqi soldiers when they arrived at the security checkpoint. After being told they needed to be searched, they opened fire on the guards. Around 1 p.m., attackers blew up a car to create a diversion by the council headquarters. Following the car bombing, the gunmen proceeded to take control over the second floor of the Saladin provincial council's headquarters. The provincial council meets every Tuesday, but according to Ali Abdul Rihman, a spokesperson for the governor, the local politicians had ended the meeting early because there was little to cover on their agenda. Therefore, many had already left the building. The gunmen did execute three councilmen, including Abdullah Jebara who was an outspoken critic of Al-Qaeda and terrorists, with shots to their heads and set fire to their bodies in front of the hostages. Insurgents were still carrying out attacks during the U.S. withdrawal and the transfer of powers to the Iraqis. As security reinforcements were arriving, another car bomb went off at the entrance of the council building. A five-hour standoff ensued. Ahmed Abdullah, Saladin's governor, explained a fierce shootout between what he believed to be at least eight gunmen that had taken over the council building, hurling grenades at the Iraqi security forces that surrounded the building. Fifteen hostages were killed execution style during the captivity. The attack also killed two journalists, who were Sabah al-Bazi and Muammar Khadir Abdelwahad. Both journalists were covering a provincial council meeting.

Iraqi Army forces together with US troops stormed the building, at which point the attackers blew up their explosives, which brought an end to the standoff. The bodies of six attackers were taken to the hospital where sources say the cause of death for two of the bodies had occurred from detonating their vest, while the other four deaths were the result of gunshot wounds. Several U.S. troops were said to have been wounded by a military spokespersonn. This incident killed 65 people and wounded 100.

Several days later the Islamic State of Iraq officially claimed credit for the attack.

== Casualties in journalism ==
=== Sabah Al-Bazi ===
Sabah Al-Bazi (22 March 1981 in Samarra – 29 March 2011) (also Romanized as al-Bazee), 30, died as a result of shrapnel from the bombing. He was assigned to cover a weapons cache discovery but was diverted by assault and killed by fire while covering operation. He worked for Al-Arabiya, CNN, Reuters and other international media as a freelance journalist. He had worked for Reuters since 2004 and CNN since 2006. Among his notable reporting assignments was the 2006 al-Askari Mosque bombing. Al-Bazi was from Saladin Governorate, married, and had three children.

=== Muammar Khadir Abdelwahad ===
Muammar Khadir Abdelwahad, 39, also died during the incident, but the cause of death is uncertain. He was a reporter for Al-Ayn news agency. According to the Journalistic Freedoms Observatory, Ayn stated he was in contact with the agency while in the building and then was quoted saying, "We lost contact at the moment of the assault by the security forces. We later learned that he was dead."

== Impact ==
The 29 March terrorist attack in Tikrit, Iraq was listed as one of the deadliest attacks in Iraq in 2011. The attack resulted in 65 fatalities and 100 wounded. Among the many that lost their lives were government workers, security forces, and journalists Sabah al-Bazil and Muammar Khadir Abdelwahad. This event highlighted the fragility of the Iraqi security forces while U.S. forces were withdrawing

== See also ==
- Iraq War insurgent attacks
- List of terrorist incidents, 2011
