= 2009 Baghdad bombings =

Six car bombings in Baghdad, Iraq

6 April 2009 Baghdad bombings
- Location: 33°20′39″N 44°26′9″E; Various, Baghdad, Iraq
- Date: 6 April 2009 (UTC+3)
- Attack type: 6 Car bombings
- Weapon: Explosives
- Deaths: 34
- Injuries: 124
- Perpetrator: unknown
- Motive: Anti-Shi'a sentiment

The 6 April 2009 Baghdad Bombings refers to six car bombings across the Iraqi capital of Baghdad. It was not known if the attacks were planned or merely coincidental.

== Background ==
The attacks came a week after Iraqi forces putting down an uprising by members of an Awakening Council angry over the arrest of their commander.

Despite a seeming decline in violence since the 2003 invasion of Iraq, the capability of many armed groups to strike with deadly results still exists. Though the government insists it is only detaining those wanted for grave crimes, certain fighters – many of them former insurgents – see it as settling sectarian scores. To this end some 250 Iraqis were killed in violent attacks in the month of March.

== Attack ==
The bombings in the Shia neighbourhood of Sadr City resulted in at least 10 deaths and 60 injuries. In the central Allawi district, another explosion killed four people and wounded 15 others. A car bomb targeted the convoy of a senior official in the Ministry of Interior resulting in the death of one civilian and one policeman, while four policemen were injured in a southeastern neighbourhood of New Baghdad. A vehicle explosion near a market in the district of Hussainiya resulted in two more deaths and 12 wounded. Another car bomb near the Doura district killed four people and injured 15 more.

== Perpetrators ==
There was/were no claim/s of responsibility as yet.

== Reaction ==
Interior ministry officials have declined to comment on whether the bombings were coordinated.

== See also ==
- List of bombings during the Iraq War
