= Terrorist incidents in Iraq in 2021 =

A number of terrorist incidents attacks occurred in 2021 in Iraq.

== List of attacks in 2021 ==
Name	Date	Dead	Injured	Location – Circumstances
January 2021 Baghdad bombings	21 January	32	110	Baghdad Governorate, Baghdad – Two suicide bombers in central Baghdad killed at least 32 people and injured another 110. This was the Iraqi capital’s first terrorist attack since 2019.
2021 Erbil rocket attacks	15 February	2	13	Erbil Governorate, Erbil – Rockets directly hit the U.S.-led coalition base near Erbil International Airport. Two people were killed in the attack, and an additional 13 were injured, including an American service member.
2021 Baghdad clashes	5 November	2	125	Baghdad Governorate, Baghdad – Political violence following the 2021 Iraqi parliamentary election.
2021 Basra explosion	7 December	7	20	Basra Governorate, Basra – A bombing killed at least seven people and injured 20 others.

== See also ==
- List of massacres in Iraq
