= 2011 Umm al-Qura Mosque bombing =

2011 Islamic State of Iraq attack

Umm al-Qura Mosque bombing
- Location: Baghdad, Iraq
- Date: 28 August 2011 (UTC+3)
- Target: Civilians population
- Attack type: Suicide bombing
- Deaths: 32
- Injuries: 39
- Perpetrator: Islamic State of Iraq

On 28 August 2011, an attack by the Islamic State of Iraq was launched at the Umm al-Qura Mosque in western Baghdad. A suicide bomber wearing a fake cast on his arm walked into the building and blew himself up inside the main hall, killing 32 people including parliamentarian Khalid al-Fahdawi. The attack took place near the end of the holy fasting month of Ramadan. The mosque is the largest place of worship for Sunni Muslims in the capital and the main headquarters of the Sunni Endowment. The organization is responsible for maintaining Sunni Muslim religious sites across Baghdad.

== See also ==
- List of terrorist incidents, 2011
