= 2007 Makhmour bombing =

Suicide attack in Makhmour, Iraq

13 May 2007 Makhmour bombing
- Part of the Iraqi civil war
- Location: Makhmour, Iraq
- Date: 13 May 2007 (UTC+3)
- Target: KDP office
- Attack type: Suicide attack
- Deaths: At least 50
- Injuries: About 70

The 13 May 2007 Makhmoor bombing was a suicide truck bomb that occurred in the northern Iraqi town of Makhmour. At least 50 people were killed and around 70 others were injured.
