= 2011 Basra bombings =

2011 terrorist incident in Iraq

- Part of Iraqi insurgency
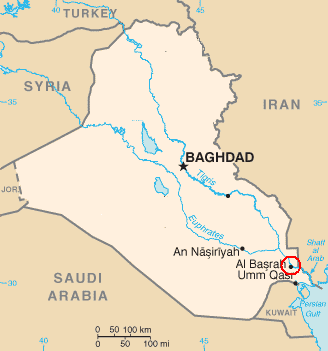
- Location: Basra, Iraq
- Date: 24 November 2011 (UTC+3)
- Target: Civilian population
- Attack type: Roadside, motorcycle and a bomb
- Deaths: 19+
- Injuries: 65+
- Perpetrator: Unknown

The 2011 Basra bombings were three bombing attacks in a busy market in Basra, Iraq, on November 24, 2011, that killed at least 19 people and wounded at least 65 more. The first bomb, concealed in a motorbike, exploded initially while the two other bombs exploded as security forces responded to the scene. As a result, most of the casualties in the bombing were troops and policemen. It was the second triple bombing in Basra in just over three weeks. Ali al-Maliki, the head of the Basra provincial council security committee said, "The fingerprints of Baathists and al Qaeda are clear in these explosions." The bombing took place one day before a major energy conference was due to take place.

== See also ==
- List of terrorist incidents, 2011
