= 2007 Karbala mosque bombings =

Series of suicide bombings in Iraq, in 2007

Imam Hussein Mosque bombing
- Part of Iraqi civil war
- Location: Karbala, Iraq
- Date: 14 April 2007
- Target: Shiite pilgrims
- Attack type: suicide bombing
- Deaths: 42
- Injuries: >160
- Motive: Anti-Shi'ism

Imam Abbas mosque bombing
- Part of Iraqi civil war
- Location: Karbala, Iraq
- Date: April 28, 2007
- Target: Shiite pilgrims
- Attack type: suicide car bomb
- Deaths: 68
- Injuries: >162
- Accused: Anti-Shi'ism

The 2007 Karbala bombings refer to a series of bombings in Karbala, Iraq in April 2007.

== Imam Hussein Mosque bombing ==
A suicide bomber killed at least 42 people in Karbala on 14 April and injured more than 160. The attacker detonated explosives at a crowded bus station in the city close to a shrine holy to Shia Muslims, at around 09:15.

== Hazrat Abbas Mosque bombing ==
A car bomb exploded in front of the Shia Abbas ibn Ali shrine on 28 April. The bomb killed at least 68 people and injured about 170 in the Iraqi city of Karbala. The bomb exploded near the golden-domed mosque. Karbala is considered the second most important shrine city for the Shia. Security officials said the car bomb was parked near a cement barrier intended to keep traffic away from the Imam Abbas and Imam Hussein shrines, which draw thousands of Shiite pilgrims from Iran and other countries.

== See also ==
- 2003 Karbala bombings
- 2004 Ashura bombings in Iraq
