= 2004 Kufa mosque bombing =

Part of the Iraq War

2004 Kufa shelling
- Part of Iraq War
- Location: Kufa, Iraq
- Date: August 26, 2004
- Target: mosque
- Attack type: mortar attack
- Deaths: 74
- Injuries: 315

The 2004 Kufa mosque bombing occurred on August 26, 2004 when the main mosque in Kufa, Iraq was hit by a barrage of mortar rounds.

The mortar rounds struck the mosque, killing 74 people, and injuring 315. Weeks before the attack happened there had been heavy fighting between U.S. forces and fighters loyal to Muqtada al-Sadr around Kufa, and Najaf. As a result of the shelling, the U.S. halted all operations around the area for 24 hours.
