= December 2009 Baghdad bombings =

Terrorist attacks in Iraq

- Location: Baghdad, Iraq
- Date: 8 December 2009; 10:30 am – 11:00 am (UTC+3)
- Target: Multiple
- Attack type: Car bombs
- Deaths: 127+
- Injuries: 448+
- Perpetrator: Islamic State of Iraq

The December 2009 Baghdad bombings were attacks in Baghdad, Iraq, which resulted in the deaths of at least 127 people and injuries to at least 448 more. The attacks have been condemned internationally as acts of terrorism. Opposition parties within Iraqi politics have suggested that the attacks were aided by corruption within the Iraqi security forces and that the Iraqi Prime Minister, Nouri al-Maliki, was incompetent in managing the incident.

The Islamic State of Iraq has claimed responsibility for the attacks.

== Attack ==
The attack occurred on the morning of 8 December 2009, at approximately 10:30 am. Local residents reported one blast just after 10:00, which was followed about a half-hour later by another four blasts in quick succession. By mid-afternoon, officials had reported five blasts in the area. At least four of the attacks are believed to have been coordinated.

The first of the bombings targeted a police patrol in Dora; this attack also wounded several people at a nearby college. The next four bombings were believed to be targeted at government buildings, and were detonated by suicide bombers. Islamic State of Iraq has claimed responsibility for these four attacks; it is unclear if the attack in Dora was connected to them. Burnt out vehicles, believed to be the ones used for the bombings, were found outside the Finance, Foreign, and Justice Ministries.

The attack is the deadliest in Iraq since the 25 October 2009 Baghdad twin truck bombings, which killed 155 people and wounded 500.

== Perpetrators ==
Islamic State of Iraq organization claimed the attack on 10 December, stating that it "targeted the headquarters of evil, the nests of non-belief (…) The list of targets will not end", and that they were "determined to uproot the pillars of the government".

== Aftermath ==
As the attacks happened in such quick succession, security forces could do nothing to stop them or curtail the damage. However, Iraqi opposition party leaders have suggested that the attacks were the fault of corrupt security officers and accused Iraqi Prime Minister Maliki of not being able to manage the incident. Colonel Ahmed Khalifa of the Iraqi Army has criticised guards at security checkpoints, saying that "It’s clearly negligence and laziness at fault."

Political interference in the Iraqi security forces was also a reason for the security failure.

The Iraqi Security forces did not feel that they could handle the aftermath of the attack alone and requested assistance from American forces, who aided them in forensic work and crowd management. American troops also airlifted survivors to hospitals. Prior to the bombing, Iraqi forces had managed to deal with such incidents largely by themselves. Speaking of the latest assistance, a member of the provincial council commented "The Americans are friends and in difficult situations they come to help us."

The day after the attack, the government's security chief for Baghdad was sacked by the Iraqi Prime Minister due to alleged security failings during the bombings.

== Reactions ==
The attacks have been internationally condemned as terrorist acts, and condolences have been offered by the US and UK, as well as Jordan. There is a universal feeling among Iraqi officials that the aim of the attacks was to undermine the Iraqi elections.

Iraq: Iraqi Prime Minister Nouri al-Maliki has said that the attacks were an attempt to "hinder the election" and cause chaos:

These cowardly terrorist attacks that took place in Baghdad today, after the Parliament succeeded in overcoming the last obstacle to conducting elections confirms that the enemies of Iraq and its people are aiming at creating chaos in the country, blocking political progress and delaying the elections.

— Iraqi Prime Minister Nouri al-Maliki

Mowaffaq al-Rubaie, the Iraqi National Security Advisor, blamed Al-Qaeda for the attacks. He said: "[Their] aim is to show the government is unable to protect civilians and its own people and also to deter people from going to ballot boxes." Iraqi Major General Qassim Atta has also blamed Al-Qaeda, commenting that: "This has the touch of al-Qaeda and the Ba'athists."

United Kingdom: A spokesman for British Prime Minister Gordon Brown said that "real improvements" have been made in the security and politics of Iraq, and that "Those who seek to use violence to undermine these efforts will not succeed". Foreign Secretary David Miliband offered his full support to the Iraqi authorities in their work against terrorism, saying that his thoughts are with those affected. Miliband has added that the Iraqi politicians and people have shown great determination in securing a democratic government.

United States: White House spokesman Robert Gibbs condemned the attacks, saying that the attacks show that there are those who feel threatened by the fact that Iraq is "moving in the right direction". Vice-President Joe Biden said "The United States strongly condemns these attacks on the Iraqi people and their elected government," while adding that the US would stand with the Iraqi people as a partner and friend as they build national unity. Hillary Clinton, the US secretary of state, also said that "the terrorists who murdered innocent civilians today will not succeed in undermining the Iraqi people's progress toward a more peaceful and democratic future. The United States will continue to support the Iraqi people as they face down violent extremism and work to build a more peaceful and democratic nation."

== See also ==
- List of terrorist incidents, 2009
