= 2011 Al Hillah bombing =

Terrorist Attack on an Iraqi police station in 2011

- Location: Al Hillah, Iraq
- Date: 5 May 2011 (UTC+3)
- Target: Iraqi Police
- Attack type: suicide bombing
- Deaths: 24
- Injuries: 72
- Perpetrator: Islamic State of Iraq

The 2011 Al Hillah bombing was an attack that took place in the city of Hillah on 5 May 2011. A suicide bomber detonated a car full of explosives at a local police station, killing 24 recruits and injuring at least 72 more. A few days after the explosion the Islamic State of Iraq claimed responsibility for it, saying it was revenge for the death of Osama Bin Laden on 2 May 2011. The insurgents apparently scouted the police HQ for some time before attacking during peak hours when more than 200 people were inside the building.

== See also ==
- List of terrorist incidents, 2011
