= 2006 Karbala–Ramadi bombings =

2006 suicide bombing in Iraq

5 January 2006 Iraq bombings
- Part of Iraqi insurgency (2003–2006) in Iraqi insurgency (2003–2011)
- Location: Karbala and Ramadi, Iraq
- Date: 5 January 2006 (UTC+3)
- Target: Shia pilgrims, police recruiting centre
- Attack type: suicide attack
- Deaths: about 120 or more
- Injuries: at least 120
- Perpetrator: Unknown
- Motive: Occupation of Iraq; Anti-Shi'ism

On 5 January 2006, a series of suicide attacks were launched in the Shia holy city of Karbala and in Ramadi city centre, each killing about 60 or more.

The bombings in Ramadi consisted of two suicide bombers detonating their bombs within minutes of each other. The casualty count by personnel on the ground put the total at 118 (including the two working dogs) 110 of which were Iraqi civilians volunteering to become Iraqi police; 8 were Americans including 2 working dogs. Thirty civilians died immediately and a further 46 were taken to Camp Ramadi for treatment.

According to a report released by The Washington Post newspaper on 6 January 2006, the residents of Ramadi alleged that al Qaeda in Iraq carried out the attacks.
