= Terrorist incidents in Iraq in 2012 =

This list is limited to bombings in Iraq and does not include other forms of attacks.

== January ==
- January 14 A bombing targeting Shiites in southern Iraq killed more than 50 people.
- January 27 A suicide bomber in Baghdad killed 33 people and wounded 65 others.

== February ==
- February 23 A series of bombings killed 32 people in Baghdad.

== March ==
- March 20 A series of explosions across Iraq killed 50 people and wounded 200 others.

== April ==
- April 19 – A series of bombings across Iraq killed 36 people and wounded 150 others.
- April 26 – two explosions at a popular coffee shop in the Diyala province killed 10 people and injured at least 15 others.

== June ==
- June 4 A suicide bomber killed 26 people and wounded 190 others in Baghdad.

== July ==
- July 23 A wave of terrorist incidents killed at least 90 people and wounded twice as more.

== August ==
- August 16 A series of bombings killed more than 90 people across Iraq.

== September ==
- September 30 A series of terrorist bombings killed 26 people and wounded 94 others.

== See also ==
- List of terrorist incidents in January–June 2012
- List of terrorist incidents in July–December 2012
- List of bombings during the Iraqi insurgency (2011–2013)
- Terrorist incidents in Iraq in 2013
