= Terrorist incidents in Iraq in 2017 =

This article lists terrorist incidents in Iraq in 2017.

== January ==
- January 1 A suicide bombing killed six policeman in Najaf.
- January 2 An IS car bomb killed 24 people in the Sadr district of Baghdad.
- January 8 Two suicide car bombs killed twenty people in marketplaces located in the Shi'ite districts of Jamila and Baladiyat in Baghdad.

== February ==
- February 14-16 A series of bombs on 3 consecutive days killed at least 48 people and injures over 50, all targeting Shi'ite majority areas in Baghdad.

== May ==
- May 30: Al-Faqma ice cream parlor bombing - An IS suicide bombing killed over 30 people at an ice cream parlor in Baghdad.

== July ==
- July 2 : A suicide bomber targets a displacement camp in Anbar, killing 14 people.

== September ==
- September 14: A suicide attack killed 50 people and injured 80 in the Southern part of Iraq. IS claimed responsibility for this attack.
