= Terrorist incidents in Iraq in 2020 =

Many attacks occurred in 2020 in Iraq. They left at least 34 people dead and another 24 were injured. An insurgent was also killed.

== List of attacks in 2020 ==
Name	Date	Dead	Injured	Involved	Location – Circumstances
2020 Camp Taji attacks	11 March	3	0	Disputed	Baghdad – Three soldiers, two American and one British, were killed when a missile hit a military base in Baghdad.
2020 Al-Maamel attack	28 August	2	17		Al-Maamel, Al- Husayniyah district – At least 2 people were killed and another 17 were injured in Al-Maamel, Al- Husayniyah district.
2020 Al-Haytawin attack	30 August	1	2	Islamic State	Al-Haytawin, Diyala Governorate – Islamic State kill one and injured two others in Al-Haytawin, Diyala Governorate.
Unnamed	1 September	1 (+1)	Unknown	Suicide bomber	Kirkuk Governorate – A woman was killed by a suicide bombing in Kirkuk Governorate.
Unnamed	1 September	1	1	Islamic State	Kirkuk Governorate – Insurgents from the Islamic State kill a soldier in Kirkuk Governorate.
Unnamed	3 September	2	0	Gang	Karaj area – An attack left at least two women dead in Karaj area.
Unnamed	5 September	2	1	Islamic State	Al-Qalaa, Jalawla sub-district – Islamic State killed two soldiers in Jalawla sub-district.
Unnamed	6 September	1	0		Bashir, Kirkuk District, Kirkuk Governorate – Missile attack in Bashir village, Kirkuk Governorate killed one.
Unnamed	7 September	5	0		Baghdad Governorate – 5 people were killed in Baghdad Governorate.
Unnamed	8 September	3	0		Diwaniyah-Babylon highway – A bomb killed 3 police on the Diwaniyah-Babylon highway.
Unnamed	12 September	1	0		Mosul – Two bombs were detonated, killing one civilian in Mosul.
Unnamed	13 September	1	0		Diyala Governorate – A civilian was shot dead in Diyala Governorate
Unnamed	17 September	4	0		Kirkuk Governorate – A convoy hit by a bomb kills 4 fighter from Popular Mobilization Forces in Kirkuk Governorate.
Unnamed	18 September	2	1		Unknown location – Kurdish insurgents kills at least 2 Turkish soldiers after attack a military base with rockets.
Unnamed	28 September	5	2		Baghdad – A missile hit a house in Baghdad close to the airport. The attack left at least 5 people dead including 3 children and another 2 children were injured.

== See also ==
- List of massacres in Iraq
