= Terrorist incidents in Iraq in 2014 =

This list is limited to bombings and does not include other forms of attacks.

== January ==
- January 2: A truck bomb killed 19 people in Baghdad.
- January 5: 20 people were killed in a series of bombings targeting a Shiite suburb.
- January 15: 75 people were killed in a series of bombings in Baghdad and Baquba.
- January 18: A series of car bombings killed 30 people in Anbar province.
- January 30: Six suicide bombers entered an Iraqi ministry building and killed 24 people before security forces regained control.

== February ==
- February 10: 22 people were killed when a terrorist accidentally blew himself up while demonstrating how to use an explosive belt.
- February 13: Two bombs killed 6 people and wounded 18 in Baghdad.
- February 18: 33 people were killed in a wave of car bombs in Baghdad.

== March ==
- March 9: At least 32 people were killed when a minibus packed with explosives exploded at a checkpoint in the city of Hilla.
- March 27: Bombings killed 33 people in Baghdad.

== April ==
- April 9: Car bombs killed 24 people across Iraq.
- April 20: Car bombs and a suicide bomber killed 9 people and injured 39 others.
- April 28: A suicide bomber killed 25 people in Khanaqi.

== May ==
- May 13: A wave of car bombs targeting Shiites killed at least 34 people.
- May 22: At least 24 Shia pilgrims were killed in three bombings in Baghdad.
- May 27: A suicide bomber killed 17 people in Baghdad.

== June ==
- June 8: At least 18 people were killed in a bombing attacking the office of Jalal Talabani's Kurdish political party.
- June 9: At least 30 people were killed in a double bombing targeting the offices of a Kurdish political party.
- June 15: 9 people were killed and 20 wounded after an attack near Tahrir Square. Further bombs went off after nightfall killing 3 people.
- June 25: A suicide bomber blew himself up outside a market in Baghdad killing 13 people and wounding 25

== July ==
- July 4: A suicide bomber detonated a vehicle at a security forces position north of Baghdad killing 15.
- July 9: Three car bombs exploded in front of a court in Hilia killing five and wounding 17.
- July 11: 28 people died following a suicide bombing in Kirkut.
- July 23: A suicide bombing killed 33 people in Baghdad.
- July 24: A car bomb killed 21 people in Baghdad.

== August ==
- August 23: A series of bombings killed 35 people across Iraq.
- August 26: A car bomb killed 10 people in Baghdad.
- August 30: A suicide bomber killed 11 people in a town south of Baghdad.
- August 31: Two suicide bombers killed 10 people in Ramadi.

== September ==
- September 1: A suicide bombing killed 37 people in western Iraq.
- September 4: A car bomb and a suicide bomber killed at least 20 people and injured dozens in Baghdad.
- September 8: A double suicide attack killed 9 people and injured 70 others in a town north of Baghdad.
- September 10: A wave of terrorist bombings killed at least 30 people in Baghdad.
- September 11: A wave of terrorist incidents killed at least 17 people and wounded 50.
- September 17: A suicide car bomb killed 7 people and destroyed a bridge in Ramadi.
- September 18: Two suicide bombings killed 13 people and injured 36 in Baghdad.
- September 27: A car bomb killed 10 people and wounded 24 others.

== October ==
- October 7: A suicide bomber rammed a vehicle into houses used by Shiite militiamen north of the city of Samarra, killing at least 17 people.
- October 9: A suicide attack killed 10 people in Baquba.
- October 12: A series of terrorist bombings in Baghdad including a suicide attack killed more than 50 people. A wave of bombings in Baquba killed 31 people and wounded 70 others.
- October 14: A suicide attack in Baghdad killed 19 people and wounded 35 others.
- October 16: Three car bombs in Baghdad killed 16 people and wounded 48 others.
- October 18: A series of car bombs in Baghdad killed 24 people.
- October 19: A suicide bombing targeting Shiites in Baghdad killed 19 people and injured more than 2 dozens.
- October 20: A wave of bombings targeting Shiites killed more than 43 people.
- October 22: Two car bombs in Baghdad killed 16 people and wounded 65 others.
- October 27: A similar attack killed 27 fighters and wounded 60 others. Another bombing in Baghdad killed 14 people and wounded 23 others.
- October 31: A series of bombings killed 15 people near Baghdad.

== November ==
- November 1: A series of terrorist bombings killed 24 people and wounded dozens in Baghdad.
- November 7: A suicide bomber killed a police general and wounded 9 policemen in Baiji.
- November 8: A series of car bombings killed 40 people and wounded dozens across Iraq.
- November 16: A series of bombings in Baghdad killed 5 people and wounded 20 others.
- November 19: A suicide attack in Erbil killed 6 people and wounded more than 20 others.
- November 23: A car bomb killed 7 people and wounded 16 others in a town south of Baghdad.

== December ==
- December 4: A series of bombs killed 35 people in Baghdad and Kirkuk.
- December 24: A suicide bomber killed 26 people and wounded 56 others south of Baghdad.

== See also ==
- List of terrorist incidents in January–June 2014
- List of terrorist incidents in July–December 2014
- Timeline of the Iraq War (2014)
- Terrorist incidents in Iraq in 2015
- Terrorist incidents in Iraq in 2013
- List of bombings during the Iraqi insurgency (2011–2013)
