= 2011 Taji bombings =

Terrorist incident in Taji, Iraq

5 July 2011 Taji bombings
- Location: Taji, Iraq
- Date: 5 July 2011 (UTC+3)
- Target: Civilian population
- Attack type: Car bomb and bomb
- Deaths: 35+
- Injuries: 50+
- Perpetrator: Unknown

The 5 July 2011 Taji bombings were two coordinated bombings, a car bomb followed by a bomb, that were detonated in the parking lot of a municipal government building in Taji, Iraq killing at least 35 and wounding at least 50.

== See also ==
- List of terrorist incidents, 2011
