= 2021 Basra bombing =

Explosion in Basra

2021 Basra explosion
- Part of Iraqi insurgency (2017–present)
- Location: Basra, Iraq
- Date: 7 December 2021
- Target: Civilians
- Attack type: Bombing
- Weapon: Explosive-laden motorcycle
- Deaths: At least 7
- Injuries: 20
- Perpetrator: Unknown
- Motive: Unknown

On 7 December 2021, a bomb blast near a hospital in the southern Iraq city of Basra has killed at least seven people and injured 20 others. The blast set a vehicle on fire and damaged a bus. According to the preliminary investigation, the motorcycle was loaded with explosives which could have caused the explosion.
