= 2011 Samarra bombing =

Terrorist incident in Samarra, Iraq

- Location: Samarra, Iraq
- Date: 12 February 2011 (UTC+3)
- Target: Shia pilgrims
- Attack type: Suicide bombing
- Deaths: 48
- Injuries: 80
- Perpetrator: Islamic State of Iraq

The 2011 Samarra bombing was an attack that took place in the city of Samarra on 12 February 2011. A suicide bomber detonated an explosives vest in a bus depot at the entry to the city as Shia pilgrims gathered to commemorate the death of one of their 12 revered imams. The attacker infiltrated the crowd at a security checkpoint before detonating his explosives, killing 48 and injuring 80. Iraqi officials alleged that the Islamic State of Iraq organization carried out the attacks.

== See also ==
- List of terrorist incidents, 2011
