= 2011 Karbala bombing =

Suicider bomber attack in Iraq

- Location: Karbala, Iraq
- Date: 25 September 2011 (UTC+3)
- Target: Shia Civilian population
- Attack type: Car bombing
- Deaths: 25
- Injuries: dozens
- Perpetrator: Unknown

An attack that took place in the city of Karbala on 25 September 2011. A car bomb exploded next to a crowded identity card office early in the morning and as people gathered to help injured in the first attack, a suicide bomber detonated his explosives.

== See also ==
- List of terrorist incidents, 2011
