= List of terrorist incidents in 2011 =

This is a list of terrorist incidents which took place in 2011, including attacks by violent non-state actors for political motives. Note that terrorism related to drug wars and cartel violence is not included in these lists. Ongoing military conflicts are listed separately.

== Guidelines ==
- To be included, entries must be notable (have a stand-alone article) and described by a consensus of reliable sources as "terrorism".
- List entries must comply with the guidelines outlined in the manual of style under MOS:TERRORIST.
- Casualty figures in this list are the total casualties of the incident including immediate casualties and later casualties (such as people who succumbed to their wounds long after the attacks occurred).
- Casualties listed are the victims. Perpetrator casualties are listed separately (e.g. x (+y) indicate that x victims and y perpetrators were killed/injured).
- Casualty totals may be underestimated or unavailable due to a lack of information. A figure with a plus (+) sign indicates that at least that many people have died (e.g. 10+ indicates that at least 10 people have died) – the actual toll could be considerably higher. A figure with a plus (+) sign may also indicate that over that number of people are victims.
- If casualty figures are 20 or more, they will be shown in **bold**. In addition, figures for casualties more than 50 will also be **underlined**.
- Incidents are limited to one per location per day. If multiple attacks occur in the same place on the same day, they will be merged into a single incident.
- In addition to the guidelines above, the table also includes the following categories:

0 people were killed/injured by the incident.
1–19 people were killed/injured by the incident.
20–49 people were killed/injured by the incident.
50–99 people were killed/injured by the incident.
100+ people were killed/injured by the incident.

== List ==
Total Incidents: 36

Dates	Type	Dead	Injured	Location	Article	Details	Perpetrator
1 January	Suicide bombing	23	97	Alexandria, Egypt	2011 Alexandria bombing	A car bomb exploded outside a Coptic Orthodox church after worshippers gathered for a prayer celebration on New Year's Eve.	Islamic State of Iraq
24 January	Suicide bombing	36 (+1)	180	Domodedovo International Airport, Russia	Domodedovo International Airport bombing	Suicide bombing in the international arrival hall of Moscow's busiest airport.	Caucasus Emirate and Al-Qaeda
24 January	Car bombing	27	70	Karbala, Iraq	24 January 2011 Iraq bombings	Two car bombs targeting Shia pilgrims struck a bus terminal and another location on the outskirts of Karbala.	Islamic State of Iraq
27 January	Car Bomb	48	78	Baghdad, Iraq	27 January 2011 Baghdad bombing	A car bomb exploded near a funeral tent in a predominantly Shia neighborhood.	
12 February	Suicide bombing	48	80	Samarra, Iraq	2011 Samarra bombing	A suicide bomber targeted a bus carrying Shia pilgrims.	Islamic State of Iraq
2 March	Shooting	2	2	Frankfurt am Main, Germany	2011 Frankfurt Airport shooting	A Kosovan was arrested for shooting at US Air Force personnel at Frankfurt airport. One of the dead was a bus driver and the other was a passenger.	Lone wolf
8 March	Car bombing	25+	131+	Faisalabad, Pakistan	2011 Faisalabad bombing	A car bomb struck a gas station, triggering off nearby gas cylinders and creating a bigger explosion.	Pakistani Taliban
9 March	Suicide bombing	43	100+	Peshawar, Pakistan	March 2011 Peshawar bombing	A suicide bomber struck a funeral for a local militia member.	Pakistani Taliban
28 March	Explosion	150+	45	Jaʿār, Yemen	Jaʿār munitions factory explosion	An ammunition plant, which had previously been raided by Al Qaeda militants, was blown up in suspicious circumstances, in a series of explosions in the Khanfar area.	Al-Qaeda in the Arabian Peninsula
29 March	Hostage Crisis	65	100+	Tikrit, Iraq	2011 Tikrit assault	Militants stormed a council building, holding dozens of people hostage at a meeting, only to execute councilors, civilians and a journalist when security forces attempted to take back the building.	Islamic State of Iraq
2 April	Car bombing	1	0	Omagh, Northern Ireland	Murder of Ronan Kerr	A car bombing killed Ronan Kerr, a Catholic member of the PSNI.	Suspected Dissident republicans
3 April	Suicide bombings	50+	100+	Dera Ghazi Khan, Punjab Province, Pakistan	2011 Dera Ghazi Khan bombings	Twin suicide bombings struck the Sakhi Sarwar Shrine, as Sufi Muslim devotees gathered for an annual three-day festival.	Pakistani Taliban
11 April	Bombing	15	300+	Minsk, Belarus	2011 Minsk Metro bombing	A bomb explosion occurred at the escalators of the Minsk Metro at the peak of the evening rush hour, targeting commuters near President Alexander Lukashenko's office.	Dzimitry Kanavalau and Vlad Kavalyou
28 April	Suicide bombing	16	20+	Marrakesh, Morocco	2011 Marrakesh bombing	A suspected suicide bombing struck a cafe in Djemaa el Fna square, killing mostly foreigners.	Moroccan Islamic Combatant Group
5 May	Car bombing	21	75	Hilla, Iraq	2011 Al Hillah bombing	A suicide bomber rammed a car packed with explosives into a police station before blowing it up.	
22 May	Bombings, shootings, hostage taking	24	21	Karachi, Pakistan	PNS Mehran attack	Attack on Mehran naval base. Six militants and 18 military personnel (including the lieutenant in charge of the anti-terrorist operation) were killed during the 16-hour battle.	Tehrik-i-Taliban Pakistan, al-Qaeda
11 June	Bombings	34	100+	Peshawar, Pakistan	June 2011 Peshawar bombings	Two explosions ripped through a market.	
16 June	Suicide bombing, Car bombing	6	7	Abuja, Nigeria	2011 Abuja police headquarters bombing	A suicide bomber drove his car into the parking lot of a police HQ after picking up a traffic officer who guided him to the spot. At least 30 cars were destroyed in the explosion.	Boko Haram
5 July	Car bombing	21	28	Taji, Iraq	2011 Taji bombings	Two explosions occurred 20 kilometers north of Baghdad. At least one of the blasts was caused by a car bomb that detonated as civilians were gathering in front of a government building to pick up identification cards.	
13 July	Bombings	26	130	Mumbai, India	2011 Mumbai bombings	Three simultaneous blasts rocked India's financial capital. Two of the bombings were in the (Zaveri Bazaar and the Opera House).	
18 July	Bombing, stabbing	18	4	Hotan, Xinjiang, China	2011 Hotan attack	18 young Uyghur men stormed a police station and killed two security guards by stabbing and lobbing molotov cocktails. They occupied the police station, took eight hostages, and smashed and set fire to the station. Shouting slogans and unfurling banners with Jihadi writing, they refused to negotiate and engaged in a firefight with police. The attack ended within 90 minutes when police shot 14 attackers dead. Authorities detained four attackers and rescued six hostages, however two were killed.	East Turkestan Islamic Movement
22 July	Bombing/shooting	77	319+	Oslo and Utøya, Norway	2011 Norway attacks	A bomb exploded outside Prime Minister Jens Stoltenberg's office and other government office buildings, and later a shooting of youth members of the Labour Party occurred on Utøya island, both committed by a right-wing militant.	Anders Behring Breivik (Lone wolf)
30–31 July	Carbombing, stabbing	23	42	Kashgar, Xinjiang, China	2011 Kashgar attacks	On the first day, two Uyghur men hijacked a truck, ran it into a crowded street, and started stabbing people, killing nine, until they were overpowered by the crowd, who killed one attacker. On the second day, the premature explosion of two car bombs intended for a dapanji restaurant killed four people. The 12 would-be car-bombers abandoned their original plan and instead stormed the restaurant with knives, killing 13 people. A firefight ensued with police capturing the group and killing seven attackers. ETIM later claimed responsibility for the attack, confirming that one of the suspects who escaped (but was later shot by police) had received training in ETIM camps in Pakistan.	East Turkestan Islamic Movement
8 August	Bombing	0	2	Atizapán de Zaragoza, Mexico	Monterrey Tech bombing	A bomb exploded in front of the Monterrey Institute of Technology and Higher Education.	Individualists Tending to the Wild
15 August	Suicide bombings, car bombs, IEDs	62	273	Kut, Najaf, Kirkuk, Kerbala and Tikrit, Iraq	15 August 2011 Iraq attacks	Series of coordinated attacks across various cities. The deadliest assault took place in Kut, where a roadside bomb followed by a car bomb targeting police killed at least 37 and wounded 68. At least six were killed and 78 injured in a double car bomb attack in Najaf. In Diyala Governorate a suicide car bomber attacked a municipality building in Khan Bani Saad, killing eight and leaving 14 injured. One person was killed and 12 wounded in simultaneous car and motorbike bomb attacks in Kirkuk and 4 more were killed (and more than 40 injured) after an attack against a police station in Kerbala Governorate. Militants attacked a counter-terrorism unit in Tikrit, hoping to free imprisoned insurgents. The attackers bypassed several security checks and had IDs and uniforms. They managed to kill two policemen and injured six more, but failed to achieve their target. In al-Wajehiya a parked car bomb exploded in front of a police HQ, killing one policeman and injuring 13 more. Other attacks also took place in Taji, Baqubah, Baghdad and Mosul.	Islamic State of Iraq
18 August	Ambush, shooting, bombing	17	40	Beer Sheva and Eilat, Israel	2011 southern Israel cross-border attacks	In the first attack, a bus was leaving Beer Sheva central bus station with mostly soldiers headed home for Eilat for the weekend when it came under attack from three gunmen from a white car who had earlier crossed into the country as it passed through Netafim border crossing checkpoint on the border with Egypt. The second attack occurred on a military vehicle which went over a roadside bomb. In the third attack, an anti-tank missile was said to have been launched on a private car 20 km north of the first shooting. Some local media reports suggested mortar fire emanated from Egypt.	
19 August	Suicide bombing	48+	100+	Jamrud, Ghundai, Khyber Agency, Pakistan	2011 Khyber Agency bombing	A suicide bomber exploded his vest in a packed mosque during Friday prayers during Ramadan near the border with Afghanistan.	Tehrik-i-Taliban Pakistan suspected
26 August	Car bomb	21	73	Abuja, Nigeria	2011 Abuja United Nations bombing	A car bomb broke through two security barriers at the United Nations building, crashed into the reception area, and detonated.	Boko Haram
13–14 September	Shooting/Bombing/Suicide attack	9	15	Kabul, Afghanistan	September 2011 Kabul attack	Militants attacked the US embassy and fought government forces for twenty hours in a multi-storey building.	Afghan Taliban
19 September	Car Bombing	8	?	Karachi, Pakistan	Chaudhry Aslam Khan	The Tehreek-i-Taliban Pakistan carried out a car bomb suicide mission in which eight people lost their lives. The intended target was Chaudhary Aslam Khan Swati, the head of the Sindh Police's Counter Terrorism Unit and chief of the Anti-Extremism Cell, at his residence in the posh Defence Housing Society Phase VIII neighbourhood, next to a school. He and his family survived the attack.	Tehreek-i-Taliban Pakistan
4 October	Car Bombing	70+	110+	Mogadishu, Somalia	2011 Mogadishu bombing	A truck laden with drums of fuel rammed a checkpoint outside a compound housing government ministries in the K4 (Kilometer 4) area, where students had gathered to register for scholarships offered by Turkey.	Al Shabaab
4 November	Car bombings, shootings, suicide bombings	100–150	100–500	Damaturu and Maiduguri, Nigeria	2011 Damaturu attacks	Series of coordinated assaults	Boko Haram
6 December	Suicide bombing	74+	160+	Kabul, and Mazar-e Sharif, Afghanistan	2011 Afghanistan Ashura bombings	At least 70 Shiite worshippers were killed in a suicide bombing at the Abul Fazal Abbas shrine in the Murad Khani district of Kabul. A second attack took place in Mazar-e Sharif, claiming at least 4 lives.	Lashkar-i-Jhangvi; Suspected
12 December	Shootings	2	3	Florence, Italy	2011 Florence shootings	A member of Casa Pound opened fire in a suburb market where many Senegalese immigrants were selling goods before committing suicide.	Gianluca Casseri
13 December	Murder-suicide	6	125	Liège, Belgium	2011 Liège attack	A French-speaking Belgian of Moroccan origin threw grenades and fired a rifle into Saint-Lambert Square, which was full of Christmas shoppers. He later shot himself.	Nordine Amrani
22 December	Suicide and car bombings	63	185	Baghdad, Iraq	22 December 2011 Baghdad bombings	14 blasts throughout the capital. Ten were improvised explosive devices (IEDs) and four were car-bombs.	
