= Khan Bani Saad =

- Town
- Location in Iraq
- Coordinates: 33°34′N 44°32′E
- Country: Iraq
- Governorate: Diyala
- District: Ba'quba

Population (2014)
  - Total: 127,000
- Time zone: UTC+3 (Arabian Time)

Khan Bani Saad (Arabic: مدينة خان بني سعد, romanized: Madīna Khān Banī Sa`ad) is a majority Shia Arab city in Diyala Governorate, Iraq.

== 2015 massacre ==
On 17 July 2015, a suicide bomber detonated a car bomb in the city's crowded market. Over 120 people were killed and 130 injured. The Islamic State of Iraq and the Levant (ISIL) claimed responsibility for the attack.
