= October 2009 Baghdad bombings =

2009 ISIS terror attack in Baghdad, Iraq

Coordinates: 33.3157°N 44.3922°E

25 October 2009 Baghdad bombings
- Part of the Iraqi insurgency (2003–2011)
- Location: Baghdad, Iraq
- Date: 25 October 2009; 10:30 am – (UTC+3)
- Target: Multiple
- Attack type: Car bombs
- Deaths: 155
- Injuries: 721+
- Perpetrator: Islamic State of Iraq

The 25 October 2009 Baghdad bombings were attacks in Baghdad, Iraq which killed 155 people and injured at least 721 people.

== Attack ==
The attack was caused by two suicide car bombs, in a minivan and a 26-seat bus, which targeted the Ministry of Justice and the Baghdad Provincial Council building in a quick succession at 10:30 am local time. The Ministry of Municipalities and Public Works, which is approximately 50 metres (160 ft) from the Justice Ministry, also sustained severe damage. Among the dead were 35 employees of the Ministry of Justice and at least 25 staff members of the Baghdad Provincial Council. Among the wounded were three American contractors. A bus carrying children from a daycare next to the Justice Ministry was also hit, killing the driver and 2 dozen children on board as well as wounding six other children.

The blasts badly damaged St George's church, the only Anglican church in Iraq. Canon Andrew White reported body parts had been blown into the church by the explosion and that a humanitarian medical clinic which operated on the site had been destroyed.

It was the deadliest attack in Iraq since August 2007 and took place very close to where car bombers killed at least 120 people at the Foreign and Finance Ministries two months earlier.

== Perpetrators ==
Iraqi Deputy Interior Minister Ahmad al-Khafaji told Adnkronos International (AKI) that the bombs were manufactured inside the Green Zone, in a location right next to the blasts. Deputy Minister al-Khafaji said, "It seems the individuals who carried out the attacks had rented a house or commercial premises in a sidestreet of the area they intended to target and gradually sneaked in the bomb-making materials."

On 11 March 2010, Iraqi police arrested Munaf Abdul Rahim al-Rawi, the mastermind of the bombings. His capture also led to the death of Al-Qaeda leaders Abu Ayub al-Masri and Abu Omar al-Baghdadi. Al-Rawi was called the "Governor of Baghdad" and masterminded many of the other Baghdad bombings since Aug. 2009, according to Major General Qassim Atta, a Baghdad military spokesman.

== Political effects ==
Iraqi Prime Minister Nouri al-Maliki had been trying to portray the country as safer than the period of civil war from 2006 to 2008. Local politicians said the blasts were trying to destroy faith in Prime Minister Nouri al-Maliki and his ability to secure the country after the U.S. withdrawal. He faced re-election in January 2010, and much of his popularity had rested on the safety of the country. The bombings prompted some Iraqis to reconsider their support for the Prime Minister.

The Prime Minister responded, stating, "The cowardly acts of terrorism which occurred today, must not weaken the resolution of Iraqis to continue their journey and to fight the followers of the fallen regime, the Baathists and al-Qaeda."

US President Barack Obama strongly condemned the attacks; Secretary of State Hillary Clinton said in a statement that the U.S. would work together with Iraqis "to combat all forms of violence and attempts at intimidation."

== See also ==
- August 2009 Baghdad bombings
- List of terrorist incidents, 2009
