= Terrorist incidents in Iraq in 2013 =

List of terrorist bombings in Iraq in 2013

This list of terrorist incidents is limited to bombings and does not include other forms of attacks.

== January ==
- January 3 A car bomb killed 20 Shiites and injured 50 others.
- January 17 Bombs killed 21 people across Iraq.
- January 22 Car bombs killed 17 people and injured dozens in Baghdad.

== February ==
- February 3 Suicide bombers killed at least 15 people and injured 70 others in Kirkuk.
- February 8 Bombings targeted Shiite areas killing 33 people and wounding 100 others.
- February 17 Car bombs killed 37 people and wounded more than 100 others in Baghdad.

== March ==
- March 17 A car bomb near Basra killed 10 people.
- March 19 Bombings in Baghdad killed 56 people and injured 200.

== April ==
- April 12 A series of bomb attacks killed at least 11 people and wounded 30 others.
- April 15 Bombs killed 33 people and wounded dozens across Iraq.

== May ==
- May 15 Bombs killed 35 people across Iraq.
- May 20 A dozen car bombs across Iraq killed at least 84 people and wounded more than 200.

== June ==
- June 8 Car bombs killed 5 people and wounded 20 others.
- June 10 Five car bombs killed 29 people and wounded 80 others in Mosul.

== July ==
- July 14 A wave of terrorist bombings killed 34 people and wounded 126 others.
- July 20 A wave of car bombs killed 65 people across Iraq.

== August ==
- August 6 Car bombs killed 36 people in and around Baghdad.
- August 10 A wave of terrorist incidents including car bombs killed 69 people across Iraq.
- August 25 Terrorist bombings across Iraq killed 46 people and wounded 80 others.

== September ==
- September 13 A bomb placed in a mosque killed 30 people and injured 45 others.
- September 21 Suicide bombers killed 72 people and wounded 120 others at a Shiite funeral.
- September 29 A suicide bomber killed 40 people and wounded dozens in a Shiite town.

== October ==
- October 7 A wave of terrorist bombings killed at least 38 people mainly in Baghdad.
- October 20 A suicide bombing killed 35 people and wounded 45 in Baghdad.
- October 27 A dozen terrorist incidents mainly car bombs killed 55 people.

== November ==
- November 14 A wave of bombings targeting Shiites killed at least 41 people and wounded 80 others.
- November 21 A series of bombings across Iraq killed at least 45 people and wounded 54 others.

== December ==
- December 25: 2013 Baghdad Christmas Day bombings: 3 bombings targeting Christians in Baghdad killed 37 people and wounded 59 others.

== See also ==
- List of terrorist incidents in January–June 2013
- List of terrorist incidents in July–December 2013
- Timeline of the Iraqi insurgency (2013)
- List of bombings during the Iraqi insurgency (2011–2013)
- Terrorist incidents in Iraq in 2012
- Terrorist incidents in Iraq in 2014
