= January 2011 Iraq attacks =

Terrorist attacks

- Location: Baghdad, Baqubah, Karbala and Tikrit, Iraq
- Date: 2 January 2011; 18–20 January 2011; 24 January 2011; 27 January 2011 (UTC+03:00)
- Target: Shia pilgrims, police buildings, funeral tent
- Attack type: Car bombs, suicide bombing, spree shooting, roadside bombings
- Deaths: 5 (2 January); 137+ (18–20 January); 27+ (24 January); 48 (27 January); Total: 217+ killed
- Injuries: 230+ (18–20 January); 78+ (24 January); 78 (27 January); Total: 386+ injured
- Perpetrators: Islamic State of Iraq (claimed; Tikrit attack)

In January 2011, a series of insurgent shooting and bombing attacks were launched throughout Iraq.

== 2 January attack ==
On 2 January 2011, four Iraqi security personnel and an engineer were killed in Baghdad by suspected insurgents. The attackers all used silencers on their weapons, and the attacks occurred within an hour of each, which implied they were deliberately targeting government officials. However, there were no immediate claims of responsibility.

== 18 January attack ==
On 18 January, a bomber killed 63 people and injured around 150 in the city of Tikrit. The bombing occurred near a police facility where several hundred people were gathered. The attack was blamed on a lack of security at the event; a local police official said that "[t]he security procedures weren't good. They did not meet the demands of such a gathering." A local councilman, Abdullah Jabara, said that the attack was committed by the Islamic State of Iraq, and was intended "to shake the security in the province and to bring back instability to Tikrit."

== 19 January attacks ==
On 19 January, at least 15 people were killed in two attacks in the towns of Baqubah and Ghalbiyah, both located in the same region about 65 kilometres (40 mi) northeast of Baghdad. In the incident in Baqubah, the attacker reportedly fired on guards at a police building before driving an ambulance with explosives into the building, where the vehicle was blown up. This attack killed either 13 or 14 people, while injuring between 60 and 70. The building collapsed after the attack, burying survivors of the initial explosion. The bombing was estimated to have used 450 pounds (200 kg) of explosives and left a crater 7 feet (2.1 m) in diameter.

In Ghalbiyah, a suicide bomber killed two people and injured 15 out of a crowd marching from Baghdad to Karbala, a holy city. An official from the Diyala Governorate and three of his bodyguards were wounded in this incident.

== 20 January attacks ==
On 20 January, at least 56 people died when two car bombs detonated near Karbala during the holy festival of Arba'een. In Baquba, three others were killed in a separate suicide bombing.

== 24 January attacks ==
On 24 January, two blasts, caused by roadside bombs, occurred in the Iraqi capital Baghdad, the first of which killed two people including an Iraqi brigadier general. The second explosion caused at least eight injuries. In Karbala, where Shia pilgrims were marking Arba'een, two car bombs detonated a few hours apart. The first bomb targeted a bus terminal to the east of Karbala and killed seven people, injuring more than double that, while the second hit south of the city and claimed 18 lives. The attacks killed 27 and wounded at least 78.

Several theories arose as a result of the attacks, including that the attacks could be the work of Saddam Hussein's former Ba'ath Party members, or that they were an attempt to reduce confidence in the security arrangements for an Arab League summit in March.

== 27 January attacks ==
Three days later on 27 January, a car bomb targeting Shias was detonated at a funeral tent in the north-western Shula district of Baghdad, killing at least 48 people were killed and 78 wounded.

== See also ==
- 2011 in Iraq
