= Terrorist incidents in Iraq in 2007 =

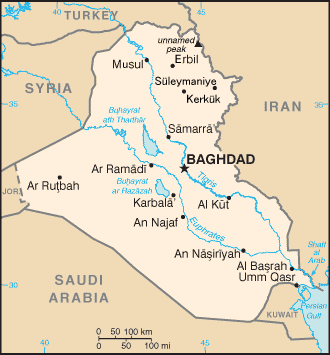
Map of Iraq

This list details terrorist incidents occurring in Iraq in 2007. In 2007, the US sent 20,000 additional troops into combat as part of a troop surge.There were 442 bombings in 2007, the second-most in a single year during the Iraq War. Major events included a January 16 attack on Mustansiriyah University, which killed 70 and injured 180, and February 3 bombings at the Sadriyah market in Baghdad, which killed 135 people.

== January ==
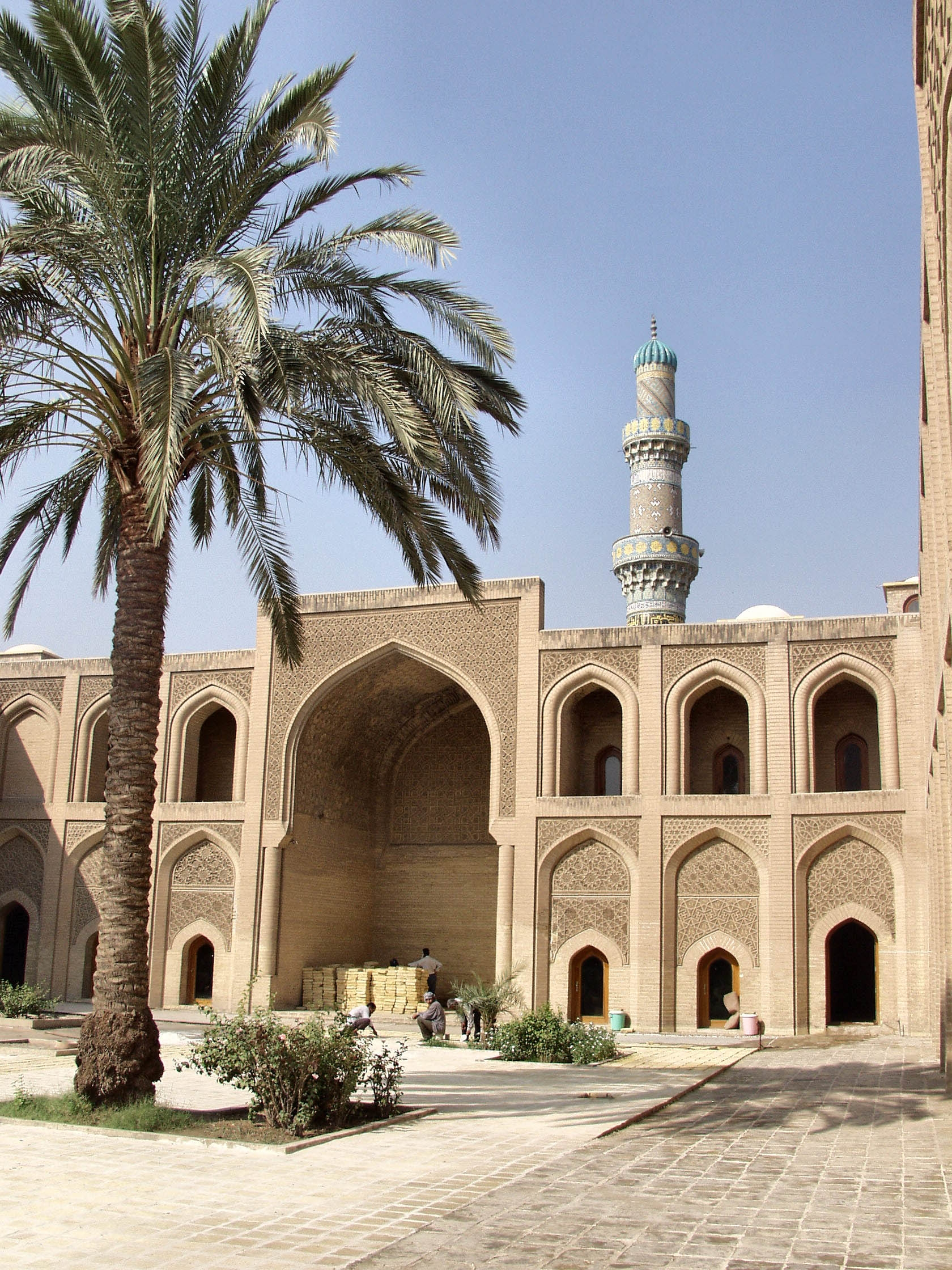
An image of Mustansiriya University, a target of a January 16 attack

- January 8: A suicide truck bomber attacked a checkpoint in Ramadi killing two policemen.
- January 10: Two suicide bombers attacked separately in Tal Afar killing five people and wounding 15 others.
- January 15: A suicide bomber attacked an office of the Kurdistan Democratic Party in Mosul killing 5 people and wounding 28.
- January 16: Mustansiriya University bombings: A double car bombing, including one suicide attack, killed 70 people and wounded 180 at the Mustansiriya University in Baghdad. Shortly after a bomb exploded in a Baghdad motorcycle market a suicide bomber attacked the police and first responders who had arrived at the scene, killing 13 people.
- January 17: A suicide car bomb struck a market in Sadr City, killing 17 people. A suicide bomber attacked near a police headquarters in Kirkuk killing 10 people. Police shot and killed a suicide bomber after he attempted to attack a police checkpoint in Ramadi.
- January 18: A suicide bomber attacked a police patrol in Mosul killing one civilian and wounding six people, including four policemen.
- January 21: A suicide bomber attacked an Iraqi army patrol in Mosul killing one woman.
- January 22: Bab al-Sharqi market bombings: A parked car bomb followed immediately by a suicide car bomber struck a predominantly Shiite commercial area in the Bab Al-Sharqi market in central Baghdad, killing 88 people.
- January 23: A suicide car bomber attacked the Kurdistan Youth Federation, an affiliate of the KDP, in Mosul killing wounding nine people.
- January 24: A suicide bomber attacked a police patrol in Baghdad killing four policemen.
- January 25: A suicide car bomber killed 26 people and wounded 55 at a busy intersection in the Karrada district of Baghdad.
- January 26: A suicide bomber attacked a Shi'ite mosque near Mosul killing one person. A suicide bomber attacked a U.S. army patrol in Baghdad killing 2 U.S. soldiers. Police killed a suicide car bomber as tried to attack their checkpoint in Ramadi.
- January 27: 13 people were killed in a double suicide bombing in Baghdad. A suicide car bomb exploded outside a Shiite mosque in Kirkuk killing the vehicle driver and passenger.
- January 28: In the first attack of its kind, a suicide bomber targeted an Emergency Response Unit in Ramadi with a chlorine-laden truck bomb. 16 People were killed in the blast, but the chlorine did not appear to injure anyone. A suicide bomber blew himself up in Kirkuk, killing eight people.
- January 29: A suicide car bomber attacked a police checkpoint in the Hurriyah district of Baghdad killing 4 people and wounding 5.
- January 30: A suicide bomber killed 23 people and wounded 57 in an attack on a Shi'ite mosque in Balad Ruz. A suicide bomber attacked a checkpoint protecting religious pilgrims commemorating the Ashura holiday in Hafriya killing two people.

== February ==
- February 1: Two suicide bombers blew themselves up in a crowded outdoor market in Hilla, south of Baghdad, killing 73 people.
- February 3: Sadriyah market bombing: A suicide bomber blew up his vehicle in Baghdad's Sadriya market, killing 135 people and wounding 305, in the deadliest single bombing since the 2003 US-led invasion. A suicide bomber inadvertently veered into & blew up an ambulance in Mosul, killing a pregnant woman and wounding two others. Police sources suggested his intended target was the Al Boursah Market.
- February 8: A suicide bomber attacked an Iraqi police checkpoint north of Haditha in Anbar province, killing seven policemen and wounding three.
- February 10: A suicide car bomber killed five people and wounded 10 near a queue outside a bakery in the mainly Shi'ite district of Karrada. A suicide car bomber killed one Iraqi soldier and wounded five people, including three civilians, as it targeted an army checkpoint in the northern Iraqi town of Tal Afar.
- February 11: In Tikrit, 80 miles north of Baghdad, a suicide truck bomber slammed into a crowd of police lining up for duty Sunday near Tikrit, collapsing the station and killing at least 30 people and wounding 50. One policeman was wounded when a suicide bomber exploded near a Shi'ite mosque in the Ilaam district in southern Baghdad.
- February 13: A suicide bomber blew up a truck near a Baghdad college in the western district of Iskan, killing 18 people and wounding 40.
- February 14: A suicide car bomber killed at least eight policemen and wounded 20 others when he blew up his vehicle at the entrance of a police station in the western Iraqi city of Ramadi, police sources said. The officer in charge of the station, Colonel Salam al-Dulaimi, died in the blast.
- February 17: A suicide bomber attacked a checkpoint near Kerbala wounding two policemen. A double suicide attack killed 10 people and wounded 83 in Kirkuk.
- February 19: At least one suicide car bomber attacked a US combat outpost north of Baghdad, killing 2 American soldiers and wounding 29 others. Two suicide bombers killed 11 people, including five police officers, when they attacked the house of a tribal leader in Ramadi. A chlorine-laden truck was detonated by a suicide bomber in Ramadi, killing two Iraqi security forces. A suicide bomber attacked the house of the army chief in Dhuluiya, killing five and wounding 15.
- February 20: Seven are killed by a suicide bomber during a funeral in Baghdad. A suicide car bomber hit a vegetable market in a Shiite enclave of the Sunni Dora district in southern Baghdad. At least five people were killed and seven injured.
- February 21: In a suicide bombing in Najaf on a police checkpoint 12 people, including seven policemen, were killed.
- February 24: A suicide truck bomber killed 52 people at a mosque in Habbaniyah. A suicide car bomber killed one civilian in southern Baghdad. A suicide bomber attacked outside an SCIRI compound in Baghdad killing three people, the compound was not his target.
- February 25: A suicide bomber attacked a college campus in Baghdad killing 41 people, mostly students.
- February 26: A suicide bomber attacked a police station in Ramadi killing 14 people. A suicide bomber attacked a checkpoint near Kirkuk killing one Iraqi soldier.
- February 27: A suicide bomber attacked an Iraqi police station in Mosul killing 7 policemen and wounding 47 people, including 15 other policemen. A suicide bomber killed four people near Mosul.
- February 28: A suicide bomber attacked an Iraqi police station in Baghdad killing 2 policemen and wounding another 4.

== March ==
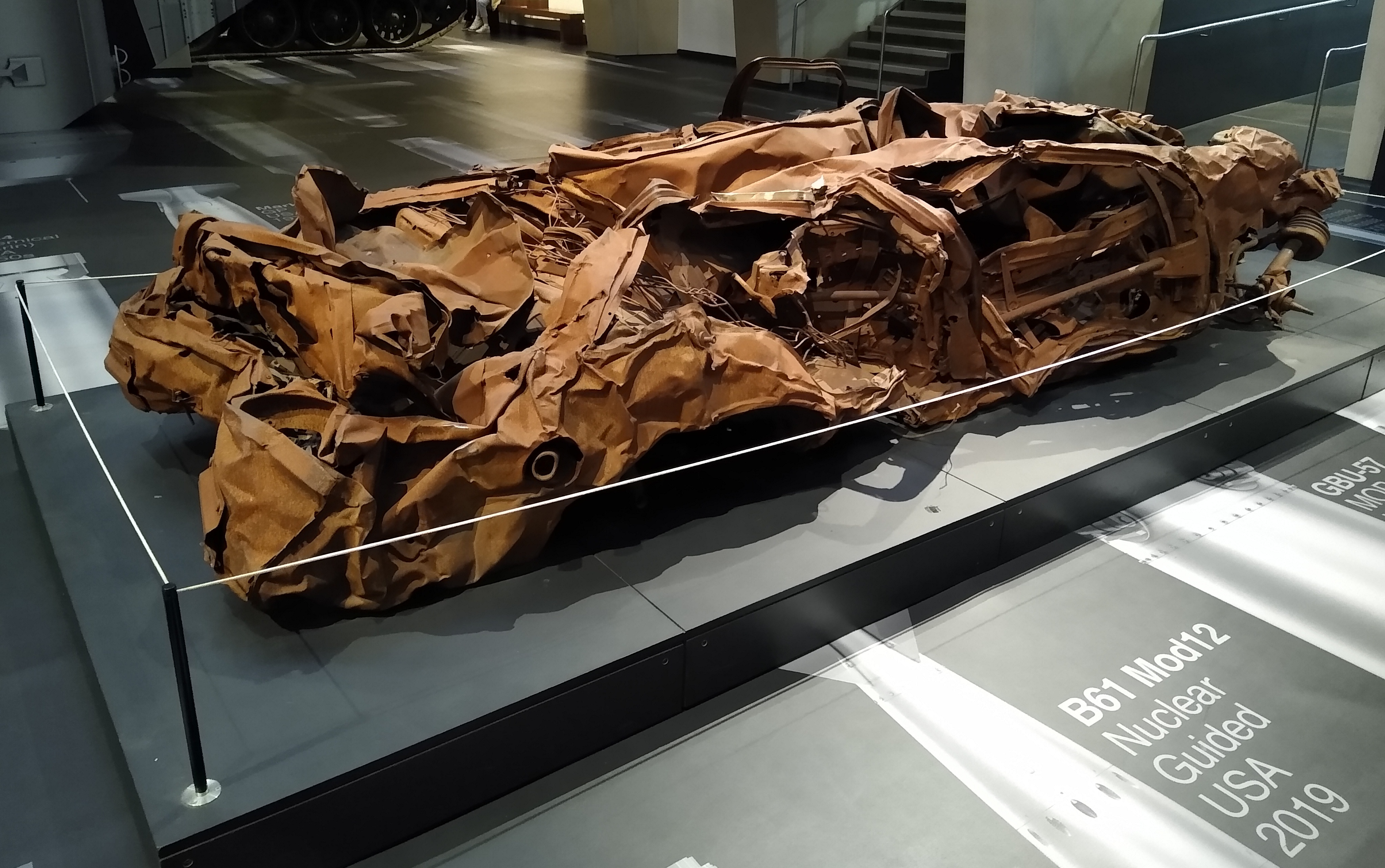
Car destroyed by the bombing on March 5

- March 3: A suicide bomber killed 3 policemen and 9 civilians in Ramadi.
- March 5: A suicide bomber killed 38 and wounded 105 people at Mutanabbi Street book market in Baghdad.
- March 6: Hillah bombings: Two suicide vest bombers killed 120 people and wounded 190 when they targeted Shi'ite pilgrims in Hillah.
- March 7: A suicide bomber kills 30 at a restaurant in Balad Ruz, in the Diyala province. A suicide bomber attacked a checkpoint in Baghdad killing 12 policemen and 10 civilians.
- March 8: A suicide car bomber struck a police patrol in Mosul, killing four policemen.
- March 10: A suicide bomber targeting a U.S. Military patrol in Sadr city kills 18 people, including 6 U.S. soldiers, and wounds 48.
- March 11: A suicide car bomber rammed a truck carrying Shiite pilgrims returning from a religious commemoration, killing 32 people. A suicide bomber attacked the offices of Iraq Islamic Party in Mosul, killing three guards. A suicide bomber killed 10 people in an attack between Talbiya Bridge and Mustansiriya Square.
- March 14: A man wearing an explosives belt strolled into an outdoor market in Tuz Khormato and blew himself up, killing 8 and wounding 25. A suicide car bomber slammed into an Iraqi army checkpoint in the Sunni neighborhood of Yarmouk, killing 2 civilians and wounding 4 others.
- March 15: A suicide bomber attacked an Iraqi army and police checkpoint in central Baghdad, killing eight policemen and soldiers and wounding 25. A suicide bomber targeted an Iraqi army checkpoint killing one Iraqi soldier in the Yarmouk district in Baghdad. A suicide bomber struck in the Karada district in Baghdad killing two civilians. A suicide bomber attacked a military checkpoint under construction west of Baquba wounding 10 Iraqi Army soldiers. A suicide bomber rammed his car into a bus killing four people in Iskandariyah.
- March 16: Three suicide bombers driving chlorine-laden trucks wounded 350 Iraqis in co-ordinated attacks across Al Anbar province. The bombers struck in Ramadi, Amiriyah, and the Albu Issa tribal region south of Fallujah. A suicide bomber wounded 11 people, including 4 policemen, in Diyala province. A suicide bomber wounded 11 people, including 4 policemen, in Diyala province.
- March 17: Iraqi soldiers from 3rd Brigade, 5th Iraqi Army Division killed a suicide bomber south of Shakarat. The bomber ignored several verbal warnings to stop, and upon being shot his vest detonated.
- March 18: An insurgent car bomb was waved through a security checkpoint in Azamiya, Northern Baghdad, after troops noticed two children were sitting in the back seats. Using the children as a decoy, the driver then gained permission to leave his vehicle parked next to a crowded marketplace in the district. With both minors still on board the car bomb detonated, killing them along with at least three other people.
- March 19: A suicide bomber attacked a Shiite mosque in Baghdad killing 6 people and wounding 32.
- March 20: A suicide car bomber targeted an Iraqi army checkpoint in the Jami'a district of Baghdad, killing one soldier and wounding another.
- March 21: A suicide truck bomber killed five and wounded 40 when he attacked the headquarters of a Kurdish party, the Patriotic Union of Kurdistan, in Mosul.
- March 23: Deputy prime minister Salam Al-Zubaie was seriously injured in a high-profile assassination attempt by a suicide bomber at a prayer hall in his own residential compound. Eight members of his entourage were killed, and there were reports the bomber could have been one of his own bodyguards.
- March 24: A suicide truck bombing destroyed a Baghdad police station, killing 33 officers and wounding another 44 people. In Haswa, a suicide truck bomber killed 11 people and wounded 45 more near a mosque. A suicide bomber blew himself up in a Tal Afar marketplace, killing ten and wounding three people. Three suicide bombers attacked a police station and two checkpoints near Al Qaim on the Syrian border killing 17 policemen and 3 civilians.
- March 25: Two soldiers died after a suicide car bomber struck an Iraqi army checkpoint in Baqouba.
- March 26: Near the Shorja marketplace in central Baghdad, a suicide car bomber killed two people and injured five others. Two suicide truck bombers attacked a U.S. military outpost near Fallujah wounding 8 American soldiers.
- March 27: Tal Afar bombing: In the deadliest single blast of the four-year-old insurgency, 152 people were killed and 347 wounded when a suicide truck bomber targeted a Shi'ite district of Tal Afar. 100 homes were destroyed in the blast. Outside Ramadi, a suicide truck bomber attacked a roadside restaurant where he killed 17 people and wounded 32 others. In an internal conflict between insurgent groups a suicide bomber killed a leader of an opposite group in the Abu Ghraib suburb of Baghdad. Outside Ramadi, a suicide truck bomber attacked a roadside restaurant where he killed 17 people and wounded 32 others. In an internal conflict between insurgent groups a suicide bomber killed a leader of an opposite group in the Abu Ghraib suburb of Baghdad. In Ramadi, a suicide bomber killed one person and injured seven others. A suicide bomber killed himself and two policemen in Baquba.
- March 28: Two suicide truck bombs, one of which contained chlorine gas, detonated outside the Fallujah Government Center. The initial blasts were followed by a sustained attack involving gunfire and two suicide bombers on foot. In total 14 US personnel and 57 Iraqi forces suffered injuries. A suicide car bomber drove into an Iraqi army post in Hay al-Jamiya in Baghdad killing one soldier and wounding three others.
- March 29: Al-Shaab market bombings: A pair of suicide bombers on foot killed 82 people in a market in Baghdad's Sha'ab neighborhood. Three suicide car bombers attacked a market in the town of Khalis, killing 43–53 people.
- March 31: In Tuz Khormato a suicide car bombing killed two Shi’ite laborers and wounded 11 more.

== April ==
- April 1: East of Mosul at an Army base in Sinaea, two suicide truck bombs killed two people and wounded 17 others.
- April 2: A suicide bomber attacked a police station in Kirkuk killing 15 people, including 1 U.S.soldier. In Baghdad, a suicide car bomber drove into a police checkpoint in the Doura neighborhood where he killed two people and wounded five others. A suicide bomber killed three people and wounded 20 near a popular Khalis restaurant.
- April 5: A suicide truck bomber attacked a Baghdad satellite television station run by Iraq's biggest Sunni political party, killing one person and wounding three.
- April 6: A suicide truck bomb containing chlorine detonated at a police checkpoint in Ramadi, killing 27 people. A suicide car bomb with two attackers on board hit a checkpoint south of Baghdad, but only the bombers were harmed.
- April 8: A suicide bomber killed seven people in the Ilaam district of Baghdad.
- April 10: A female suicide bomber on foot killed 17 recruits and injured 33 others outside a police station in the majority Sunni Muslim town of Muqdadiya.
- April 12: Parliament bombing: A suicide bomber penetrated the Green Zone and exploded himself in a cafeteria within the parliament building, killing Iraqi MP Mohammed Awadh and wounding more than twenty other people. A suicide truck bomb killed 10 people when it detonated in the middle of Baghdad's al-Sarafiya bridge, collapsing large parts of the steel structure and sending cars plunging into the river below.
- April 14: A suicide car bomber killed at least 44 people and wounded 224 at a crowded bus station near a major Shi'ite shrine in Kerbala. A suicide car bomber detonated his device near a checkpoint at Baghdad's Jadriyah bridge, killing 10 people. A suicide car bomber killed five Iraqi soldiers and wounded four others when he targeted a checkpoint in Baiji. Four would-be suicide attackers were killed in Kirkuk when one of them detonated his explosives belt prematurely, said Police Brig. Adil Zain-Alabideen. No civilians were hurt.
- April 15: A suicide bomber blew himself up on a small bus killing six people and wounding 11 in a Shiite are of northwestern Baghdad. In Mosul six people were killed in a double suicide car bomb attack on an Iraqi army base. Four Iraqi soldiers were among the dead.
- April 16: Nine people were killed and ten wounded when a suicide car bomber targeted a police directorate in Ishaqi.
- April 17: A suicide bomber in a tanker targeted a police patrol east of Mosul, killing one civilian and wounding four Iraqi soldiers.
- April 18: Baghdad bombings: A suicide bomber killed 41, including 5 policemen, and wounded 76 in Sadr City. A suicide bomber attacked a police checkpoint in Baghdad's Sadiyah district killing two policemen and wounding eight. A suicide bomber killed two policemen and wounded four people when he targeted a police patrol near Baghdad. A suicide bomber injured seven people near Mosul.
- April 19: In Baghdad a suicide car bomber drove his vehicle into a fuel tanker killing 12 and wounding 34 people.
- April 20: A suicide truck bomber killed a civilian and wounded 8 U.S. troops when he detonated his vehicle under a highway overpass near Saqlawiya. A suicide truck bomber targeted a police station near Falluja, killing two civilians and wounding 37.
- April 22: A double suicide attack on a police station in Baghdad killed 12 people and wounded 95 others. Most of the dead were civilians.
- April 23: 9 American soldiers were killed and 20 wounded in a double suicide truck bombing at a military base in Diyala province. The U.S. military claimed only one vehicle was involved, but witnesses & Al Qaeda insisted two separate suicide truck bombs had been used. A suicide belt bomber attacked a restaurant near the entrance to the Green Zone, killing seven people and wounding 16. Three suicide car bombs hit a restaurant and two checkpoints in Ramadi, killing between 20 and 29 people. A suicide car bomber killed 10 people and wounded 20 at a PDK office near Mosul. A suicide car bomber killed 10 policemen, including the chief of police, and wounded 23 more when he targeted a gathering of senior police officials in Baquba. A suicide car bomber targeted Diyala Governorate's hall, killing 4 and injuring 25.
- April 24: A suicide truck bomb targeted a police patrol in the Albufarraj area near Ramadi, killing 25 people and wounded 44.
- April 25: A suicide vest bomber attacked a police station in Balad Ruz killing nine people, including at least four policemen, and wounding 16 others.
- April 26: A suicide car bomber killed at least ten Iraqi soldiers and wounded 15 other people at an Iraqi army checkpoint in Khalis. Two suicide bombers detonated 50 yards from a PDK office in Zumar near Mosul, killing three security guards.
- April 27: A suicide bomber attacked the home of the chief of police in Hit, killing 10–15 people. A suicide bomber exploded himself near a checkpoint in Kisk north of Kirkuk, killing four policemen.
- April 28: A suicide car bomber killed 60 people in Karbala when he struck a checkpoint outside the al-Abbas shrine. A suicide bomber attacked a military checkpoint in Khalis, killing one Iraqi soldier and wounding three others.
- April 30: A suicide vest bomber targeted a Shi'ite funeral in Khalis, killing at least 32 people. A suicide car bomber detonated his vehicle inside a subway tunnel near Nisour square in Baghdad, killing two civilians and injuring 15. A suicide car bomb injured four people when it exploded in Baghdad's Hay Al-Ja'mia neighborhood near the Mula Huaish mosque.

== May ==
- May 2: A suicide car bomber struck a police car near Al Rafidein police station in Sadr city, killing between four and nine people.
- May 5: A suicide car bomber killed one person when he targeted the Karkh police directorate in Baghdad's Yarmuk neighbourhood. A suicide vest bomber exploded himself amongst a queue of Iraqi army recruits in Abu Ghraib, killing 15. McClatchy reported that that attack was caused by two suicide car bombs, but all other news reports and also Al Qaeda's own communique attributed it to a lone vest bomber.
- May 6: A suicide car bomb exploded near the police directorate in Samarra, killing up to 12 police officers. CNN reported that 2 U.S. soldiers were also killed in the attack.
- May 7: Two suicide car bombers struck a market and a police checkpoint near Ramadi, killing 13 people. A suicide car bomber attacked a police checkpoint on the outskirts of Baghdad, killing eight policemen and wounding 12.
- May 8: A suicide car bomber struck a market in the Shi'ite city of Kufa, killing 16 people and wounding 70 others. A suicide vest bomber wearing a police uniform exploded himself inside a police station in the town of Jalawla during morning roll call, killing two to five police officers.
- May 9: A suicide truck bomb detonated outside the Interior Ministry in Irbil, killing at least 19 people and wounding 80.
- May 11: A pair of suicide car bombers hit Iraqi police checkpoints on two bridges crossing the Diyala River, a Tigris tributary. The attacks on the southern edge of Baghdad in a Shi'ite area killed 23 people, including 11 police officers, and badly damaged one of the bridges. A third truck bomb struck a bridge near the town of Taji just north of Baghdad, followed immediately by a car bomb which killed four soldiers, but agencies did not report whether either of those bombings were suicide attacks.
- May 12: According to McClatchy, police commandos manning a checkpoint opened fire on a truck bomb as it was being driven up to a petrol station in Baghdad's Al-Meda'en neighbourhood, causing it to explode and kill just the driver. CNN, however, reported that the explosion killed two civilians and was caused by a parked car bomb.
- May 13: 50 people were killed in a suicide truck bombing targeting a KDP office in the town of Makhmoor in northern Iraq.
- May 14: Two Iraqi soldiers were killed when a suicide car bomber attacked a military checkpoint in Baghdad's Mansour neighborhood.
- May 15: McClatchy reported that a suicide car bomb struck a market in Abu Saida town, Diyala province, killing 12 and injuring 22. Reuters meanwhile put the death toll as high as 45 and reported that the attack was a chlorine bombing, but made no reference to it being a suicide attack. A suicide car bomber hit an Iraqi army checkpoint near Mosul, wounding four soldiers.
- May 16: Heavy street fighting erupted in Mosul in which there were up to 10 car bombs exploding, seven of which were suicide bombings. 10 police officers, one soldier, one civilian and 15 insurgents were killed in the fighting. Seven tribesmen were killed during a suicide bombing at a checkpoint near Fallujah. A soldier died in a suicide bombing at a checkpoint in the Hadeed area of west Baquba.
- May 18: A suicide bomber attacked an Iraqi police checkpoint in Mussayab killing three people and wounding four, mostly policemen. A suicide bomber killed three policemen and wounded two in Hilla. A suicide bomber detonated his cargo near a U.S. convoy in Fallujah 5 U.S. Marines were among the dead.
- May 20: Two suicide bombers targeted an Iraqi army checkpoint and military HQ in Baghdad, killing one soldier and one civilian. A suicide truck bomber using chlorine gas attacked a police checkpoint in Zangora district west of Ramadi, killing between two and 11 people.
- May 21: A suicide car bomber rammed his cargo into a checkpoint in Fallujah. No casualty figures were released.
- May 22: A 17-year-old suicide vest bomber blew himself up in the house of two brothers affiliated with the Anbar Salvation Council. Ten people were killed, including the intended targets Sheik Mohammed Ali & police Lt. Col. Abed Ali, as well as their wives and children. A suicide car bomber targeted a police checkpoint on the Al Mikaneek bridge in Baghdad's Doura district, killing one police officer and wounding three other people.
- May 23: A suicide vest bomber killed 15–20 people in a cafe in Mandali, a mainly Shiite Kurd town near the Iranian border. A suicide bomber killed a policeman and wounded three others in the Doura section of Baghdad.
- May 24: Reuters reported that a suicide car bomber targeted a funeral procession in Fallujah, killing at least 28 people. AP attributed the explosion to a parked car bomb however. A suicide car bomber killed an Iraqi soldier and wounded three others when he struck an Iraqi army checkpoint in northern Baghdad. A suicide vest bomber killed three civilians on a minibus in eastern Baghdad.
- May 26: In Baghdad's Ghazaliya district, two people were killed and 11 wounded during a suicide car bomb attack on a checkpoint.
- May 28: A suicide car bomber rammed his vehicle into a police checkpoint, injuring three officers and a child.
- May 31: A suicide bomber killed 25 people, including 10 policemen, and wounded 30 more at a police recruitment center in Fallujah. In Ramadi, a suicide truck bomber killed five people and wounded 15 more. A suicide car bomber attacked a U.S. military checkpoint in Baghdad wounding 8 U.S. soldiers and 3 civilians.

== June ==
- June 1: A suicide truck bomber attacked what is thought to be an al-Qaeda safehouse; at least two insurgents were killed. A suicide truck bomber attacked a police lieutenant colonel's home in Shurkat killing 12 civilians.
- June 2: A suicide car bomber at a checkpoint in Shurqat killed five Iraqis, including two soldiers and two policemen. A suicide bomber attacked a U.S. military patrol in Babil province killing 1 U.S. soldier. Another bomber was killed when his vest detonated after the soldiers fired on him.
- June 3: A chlorine-laden car bomb – possibly driven by a suicide attacker – targeted FOB Warhorse near Baquba. In the aftermath of the attack at least 62 U.S. soldiers were sickened by noxious gas, but no-one was seriously injured. A suicide car bomber killed at least 10 people and injured 30 others when he targeted a police convoy in a busy market area in Balad Ruz.
- June 4: Three Iraqi soldiers were killed yesterday when a suicide car bomber attacked their checkpoint near Taji. Two guards were wounded when a suicide truck bomber attacked the home of a police brigadier; 11 people were also injured.
- June 5: A suicide car bomber killed 19 people and wounded 25 in a Fallujah marketplace. In Baghdad, a female suicide bomber detonated prematurely after security forces opened fire on her at an Interior Ministry police recruitment center in the Sadr al-Qanat neighborhood. Three police commandos were injured during the incident.
- June 7: Near the Syrian border at Rabea, a suicide bomber killed 10 people, while wounding at least 30 Iraqis and five British contractors. Six people were wounded during a botched suicide truck attack at a police checkpoint near Ramadi; police fired at the driver and blew the truck up before it reached its destination.
- June 9: A suicide truck bomber killed 14 Iraqi soldiers and wounded 30 more during an attack at a checkpoint near Hilla. In Baquba, two suicide bombers at a police checkpoint killed one officer.
- June 10: A suicide truck bomber killed 14 policemen and wounded 42 more at a police station in Tikrit. A suicide truck bomber destroyed a pillar of a bridge over the main highway between Mahmudiya and Baghdad collapsing part of the bridge and killing 3 U.S. soldiers and wounding 6 other soldiers and an Iraqi interpreter. South of Baquba, a suicide bomber killed two policemen and wounded three others at a police station.
- June 12: A suicide car bomber in Ramadi killed three policemen and wounded 15 others.
- June 13: In Ramadi, four policemen were killed an 11 wounded during a suicide car bombing at a checkpoint outside town. A suicide bomber in a Mandali police station killed three people, including the police chief and wounded five others. A suicide bomber was killed in Baquba before he could detonate his cargo.
- June 14: A gunman blew himself up in front of the Arabic Advisory Council office in Diyala province. A suicide bomber killed two policemen and injured five others in an attack in Fallujah.
- June 17: A suicide vest bomber killed at least four civilians when he detonated himself amongst a crowd gathering to renew their Falluja residency badges in Jbil district. Three policemen were killed and seven more were wounded during a suicide car bombing in Baiji.
- June 18: A suicide truck bomber targeted Iraqi security troops occupying the Al Mutawakil school in central Samara. Gunmen also attacked the building as a diversion, and in total four soldiers and one civilian were killed.
- June 19: Al-Khilani Mosque bombing: A suicide bomber killed 87 people and wounded some 200 more when he rammed his truck into the Khilani Shi'ite mosque in Baghdad.
- June 20: A suicide car bomber killed five policemen and wounded 13 other officers in Ramadi.
- June 21: A suicide truck bomber killed at least 20 people and wounded 75 when he rammed his vehicle into the municipal headquarters of Sulaiman Bek, about 90 km south of Kirkuk. A suicide truck bomb detonated near a building housing police commandos in Madaen 45 km south of Baghdad, killing three policemen and wounding 12.
- June 22: Aswat Aliraq reported that a suicide bomber targeted a police checkpoint in al-Baghdadi, killing 20 policemen and wounding 10. A suicide bomber killed two people and wounded four when he blew himself up in a telecommunications office in Falluja. A suicide vest bomber attacked a police checkpoint at al-Somoud bridge in western Fallujah, killing three policemen.
- June 23: A suicide vest bomber killed two policemen inside Fallujah market after being confronted by them. A car bomb with two apparent suicide bombers on board targeted a U.S. military patrol in Tikrit. The soldiers fired at the car, killing both occupants and causing the vehicle to crash without its cargo being detonated.
- June 25: A suicide vest bomber blew himself up in the lobby of the Mansour Hotel in Baghdad, killing at least 12 people. Amongst the dead were six tribal leaders, two of their bodyguards, and an anchorman with Iraqiya state television. A suicide bomber in a fuel tanker struck Baiji police headquarters in northern Iraq, killing 27 people including up to 17 policemen. A suicide car bomber targeted a government compound in Hilla, killing at least eight people. Shortly after midday a suicide vest bomber detonated on a side-road near Al Waziriyah fuel station in Baghdad. No casualties were reported. In Siniyah, a suicide bomber killed two Iraqi soldiers and wounded three others at a checkpoint.
- June 27: A suicide car bomber killed one police commando and wounded six others at a police checkpoint in al-Jaderiyia in Baghdad.
- June 29: A suicide car bomber killed four people and wounded 11 when he targeted an Iraqi army position in the Tarmiya neighborhood of Baghdad. A suicide truck bomber killed six Iraqi soldiers and wounded five at an army post in Mishada.
- June 30: A suicide bomber dressed as a policeman killed up to 25 people when he blew himself up outside a police recruitment centre in Muqdadiya, mostly policemen and volunteers.

== July ==
- July 1: A suicide truck bomb hit a police checkpoint in Fallujah, killing two policemen. In Ramadi a suicide car bomb struck a police station or checkpoint, killing five policemen. It was also reported that a suicide truck bomb exploded north of Ramadi on a bridge crossing the Euphrates, damaging the bridge and injuring two civilians, though this and the other Ramadi attack were likely one and the same. A suicide bomber killed one civilian and wounded four others when he detonated his cargo during an approach to a police checkpoint near al-Jadriya bridge in Baghdad.
- July 2: A suicide vest bomber targeted a Fallujah tribal leader, Sheik Kamel Mohammed al-Essawi, killing four civilians and wounding 10 others.
- July 4: A suicide car bomber killed 15 people at a checkpoint near Ramadi. A suicide car bomber killed between three and seven people when he targeted a police patrol outside a restaurant in Baiji. A suicide car bomber killed two policemen and wounded seven others at a police checkpoint in al-Salam district of Baghdad. A suicide bomber killed four police commandos and wounded eight more in Doura district of Baghdad.
- July 5: A suicide car bomber struck the convoy of a wedding party in Baghdad, killing 17 people.
- July 6: A suicide car bomb detonated outside a cafe in the Shiite Kurdish village of Ahmad Maref near the Iranian border, killing 26 people. A suicide vest bomber attacked a funeral tent in the Shiite Kurdish village of Zargosh in Jalwla, killing 22. A Saudi man was detained while trying to carry out a suicide bomb attack in a truck carrying canisters of chloride in Ramadi.
- July 7: Amirli bombing: Approximately 150 Iraqis were killed and 250 wounded when a suicide truck bomb resembling an Iraqi military vehicle exploded in a busy market in the village of Amirli near Tuz Khurmatu. Some reports put the death toll higher than 160, which would make it the deadliest single insurgent bombing since the 2003 invasion. A suicide car bomber killed five Iraqi soldiers and one other person at an Iraqi army checkpoint in the Zayuna neighborhood of southeastern Baghdad. A suicide bomber attacked a military checkpoint in eastern Baghdad, reportedly wounding 23 people, though it was unclear if this and the Zayuna attack were one and the same.
- July 8: A suicide bomber attacked a truck carrying military recruits south of Baghdad near Haswa, killing 23 recruits and wounding 27 more. A suicide bomber attacked a U.S. military patrol just west of Baghdad, killing 1 American soldier and wounding three others. A suicide bomber was killed along with three accomplices in Hilla when their bomb exploded prematurely.
- July 9: A suicide car bomber killed three Iraqi soldiers and four policemen in an attack on a checkpoint in the Doura district of Baghdad. An unknown number of people were killed or wounded during a suicide car bombing at funeral in the village of Zarghosh.
- July 10: A suicide bomber killed one police commando and injured eight in an attack in Saidiya district of Baghdad. A suicide vest bomber on a bicycle detonated next to two police vehicles in the Al Jumhuriyah area of central Fallujah, wounding between one and three people.
- July 11: In the town of Garmah, two suicide vest bombers blew themselves up amongst a crowd of the al-Jumailat tribe in the house of Sheikh Meshhin al-Khalaf. Later, two more suicide vest bombers mingled in with people evacuating the casualties before detonating their explosives. In total some 21 people were killed and 50 wounded, many critically. In the Al Saidiyah neighborhood of Baghdad police manning a checkpoint opened fire on an approaching car bomb, causing it to detonate and killing the driver.
- July 12: Seven people were killed when a suicide vest bomber targeted guests celebrating the wedding of an Iraqi policeman in Tal Afar. For the second time in three days, a suicide vest bomber on a bicycle wounded a policeman at a checkpoint in Falluja. A suicide bomber killed two people when he targeted a police recruitment centre in Fallujah.
- July 14: A suicide bomber plowed his explosives-packed vehicle into a line of cars queuing at a Baghdad gas station, killing seven people.
- July 16: A double suicide car and truck bomb attack in Kirkuk left at least 85 people dead. The targets were the headquarters of the Patriotic Union of Kurdistan, and the Haseer food market. In Baghdad a suicide car bombing struck a police checkpoint on a road leading to an Interior Ministry building, killing four policemen and a civilian.
- July 17: A suicide car bomb targeting an Iraqi Army patrol in Baghdad's Zayouna district killed between eight and 20 people.
- July 22: Two suicide bombers in a minivan struck a house in Taji where Sunni tribal leaders opposed to al Qaeda were meeting, killing between three and five people.
- July 23:Seven policemen were killed when a female suicide bomber detonated her explosives at a police checkpoint in Ramadi.
- July 24: A suicide truck bomber struck a crowded market near a children's hospital in Hilla, killing 26 people.
- July 25: Two suicide car bombers in Baghdad killed 50 Iraqi soccer fans celebrating their national team's semi-final victory in the Asian Cup. The first struck in Baghdad's Mansour district, and the second hit an army checkpoint in the east of the city.
- July 26: A suicide vest bomber blew himself up at the gate of a police station in the northern Tal Abta area, killing five policemen and one civilian.
- July 30: A suicide truck bomb targeting a joint Iraqi army and police checkpoint killed six security members near the town of Balad.

== August ==
- August 1: A suicide bomber killed 50 people after luring motorists to an explosives-laden fuel truck near a petrol station in Baghdad's Mansour district. A suicide car bomb killed 15–20 people near a popular ice cream shop in the al-Hurriya Square of Baghdad's Karrada district.
- August 2: A suicide car bomber targeted recruits lining up outside a police station in the northern town of Hibhib, killing 13 people.
- August 5: A suicide car bomb targeted a vehicle workshop at the entrance to the town of Mahmudiya, killing two people and wounded five.
- August 6: A suicide truck bomber killed at least 28 people including 19 children in Tal Afar.
- August 7: A suicide bomber killed seven people and wounded eight near a market in the village of Salih Al Khalaf, north of Baghdad. A suicide car bomber struck an American checkpoint near the Arab Shoka village north of Baquba, killing 1 U.S. Soldier.
- August 8: A suicide bomber blew himself up in a barber shop in the Gatoon neighbourhood in Baquba, killing five people and wounding eight.
- August 9: Police detained a suicide bomber about to detonate an explosive vest in a crowded market in Ba'quba.
- August 10: Four Peshmerga fighters were killed and 14 wounded when a suicide car bomber struck their convoy in Ein Zala village north of Mosul.
- August 14: Qahtaniya bombings: Four suicide vehicle bombers massacred hundreds of members of northern Iraq's Yazidi sect in the deadliest post-war attack to date. The final death toll given by the Iraqi government was 411, but the Iraqi Red Crescent reported that over 500 people had been killed and 1500 wounded. A suicide truck bomber struck the Thiraa Dijla Bridge near Taji, killing ten people and sending three civilian vehicles plunging into the river below.
- August 15: A suicide car bomber killed between two and five people when he targeted a senior judge in Hilla. A suicide car bomb struck a police patrol in Mosul, killing one officer. Two suicide bombers were killed in heavy fighting in Buhriz, near Baquba, when their vests detonated prematurely. In total the battle killed 21 insurgents and six civilians.
- August 21: A suicide vest bomber wounded eight people when he targeted a queue outside a police station in Fallujah. In al-Arafiya, a man died preventing a suicide bomber from reaching a meeting between US soldiers and members of a civilian defence force.
- August 22: A suicide fuel tanker bombing killed 27 people at a Baiji police station. Officials initially put the death toll at 45, but later revised that figure down. Ten people were killed when a suicide motorcycle bomber struck a police patrol in a Muqdadiyah marketplace. Two suicide car bombers killed four Iraqi soldiers and wounded 11 US soldiers in an attack on a joint US-Iraqi outpost in Taji.
- August 23: A suicide bomber was killed by police when he targeted a checkpoint in Fallujah's Dam street. Two people were wounded.
- August 26: The Iraqi army foiled three suicide truck bomb attacks in Mosul, resulting in the death of one of the bombers and the detention of the other two.
- August 27: A suicide vest bomber in Fallujah killed 12 people at the al-Raqeeb Mosque after evening prayers.
- August 28: Police reportedly killed a gunman wearing a suicide vest in Mosul.
- August 31: A suicide car bomber killed four police commandos and wounded seven when he targeted their patrol in al Jallam village near Samarra.

== September ==
- September 1: A suicide car bomber wounded six people when he targeted an Iraqi army patrol in Mosul.
- September 2: A suicide car bomber killed two soldiers and injured eight when he targeted the first gate of an Iraqi Army base in Taji.
- September 3: A suicide car bomb targeted a police checkpoint in the al-Jazeera area near Ramadi, killing two policemen and wounding 13 other people. US forces killed five gunmen who had attacked a police station in al-Saqlawiyah, including one who was wearing a suicide vest.
- September 5: A suicide car bomb at a Mosul checkpoint killed one policeman and wounded 28 other people.
- September 8: A suicide car bomb near a Sadr City police station in Baghdad killed 15 and wounded 45 others.
- September 9: A suicide fuel tanker bombing hit an Iraqi army checkpoint near a bridge in Balad, Salahuddin province. Four soldiers were killed and 15 wounded. Two people were killed and six wounded when a suicide car bomber targeted an Iraqi army checkpoint in Mahmudiya.
- September 10: A suicide truck bomb killed at least ten people and wounded 60 others in the village of Tal Marag, near Mosul, when he targeted the offices of the Kurdish Democratic Party. A suicide bomber attacked a Saqlawiyah police checkpoint, killing two policemen and two civilians and wounding two other policemen.
- September 14: A suicide bomber attacked a police checkpoint at a restaurant in Baiji killing 11 people, including nine policemen, and wounding 15 others.
- September 15: Ten people were killed and 15 injured when a suicide car bomber blew up his vehicle near a bakery in Baghdad's southwestern Amil district as Muslims were preparing to break the Ramadan fast. The Iraqi military detained a would-be suicide bomber in Mosul.
- September 16: A bomb – either attached to a suicide bomber or a booby-trapped bicycle – killed six people at an outdoor cafe in the northern town of Tuz Khurmato.
- September 18: A suicide bomber killed a civilian in the Baladiyat neighborhood of Baghdad. A suicide bomber attacked a mobile phone shop in Jalawlaa, killing four and wounded 15 others. In Mosul Iraqi soldiers killed a suicide bomber before he attacked their convoy but two soldiers were still wounded. Also a suicide bomber attacked a U.S. military patrol in central Iraq killing 1 U.S. Soldier
- September 22: In Hibhib a suicide bomber attacked an army checkpoint wounding five people, including Iraqi soldiers.
- September 24: A suicide bomber attacked a gathering of local leaders in Baquba, the chief of police was among the 28 dead and another 50 were wounded, one other police official was killed and 2 U.S. soldiers were among the wounded. In Abu Maria, a suicide truck bomber killed six people, including two policemen and an Iraqi soldier, and wounded 17 others at a checkpoint.
- September 25: A suicide car bomber in Basra killed three policemen and wounded 20 during an attack on a police station. In Mosul, a suicide bomber detonated his vest near a police colonel; ten were wounded, including the police officer and a judge. A suicide car bomber targeted the head of the Hawija City Council; the chairman, two guards, and a civilian were wounded.
- September 26: A suicide bomber killed a civilian and wounded another in Baghdad. A suicide bomber killed three people and wounded 50 in Mosul. Also, police killed a suicide bomber before he could detonate his cargo. A suicide bomber in Fallujah caused no casualties.
- September 29: A suicide bomber in Mosul killed five policemen and one civilian and wounded 21.

== October ==
- October 1: In Mosul a suicide car bomber killed a university professor and wounded seven other people.
- October 2: In Khalis a suicide bomber attacked a police station killing six people, including two policemen.
- October 4: A suicide bomber in Tal Afar killed three people and wounded 57 at a marketplace.
- October 8: A suicide truck bomber destroyed a police station in the village of Dijlah, north of Baghdad, killing 13 people, including 3 policemen, and wounding 22 other people. A suicide bomber attacked a police checkpoint in Tikrit killing 3 policemen and 1 civilian and wounded 10 other people. A suicide bomber wounded seven policemen in Khalis. A suicide bomber in the Arab Jabour area on Baghdads' southern outskirts blew himself up to avoid capture wounding 2 U.S. special forces soldiers.
- October 9: 22 people were killed and 30 were wounded in an attack by two suicide truck bombers in Baiji.
- October 10: A suicide bomber attacked the KDP headquarters in Mosul killing seven people and wounding 20. A suicide bomber attacked an army base in al-Zab killing one Iraqi soldier and wounding seven others.
- October 11: A suicide bomber attacked a cafe in Baghdad killing 8 people and wounding 25. A suicide bomber attacked the PUK headquarters in Mosul wounding 8 people, including 4 PUK guards.
- October 14: A suicide car bomber killed 18 people and wounded 37 in Samara in an attack near a mosque. A suicide bomber also attacked a police commando station in Samara killing 4 police commandos and wounding 9. In the village of Baghdadi near Ramadi, a suicide car bomber killed four members of a police major's family and wounded eight others.
- October 15: In Baghdad, a suicide car bomber killed four people and wounded 25 others. A suicide car bomber attacked a checkpoint of a U.S.-allied Iraqi militia in Balad killing 6 militiamen and wounding 8. A policeman and four members of his family were killed when a suicide bomber drove into the policeman's home in Heit.
- October 16: A suicide truck bomber killed 16 people and wounded 80 in an attack on a police station in Mosul.
- October 26: A suicide bomber killed a woman and wounded four other people in an attack on the headquarters of the U.S.-allied Iraqi militia, 1920s Revolution Brigades, in Muqdadiyah.
- October 27: U.S. forces killed a suicide bomber before he could detonated his explosives in Baghdad.
- October 29: A suicide bomber on a bicycle killed 30 policemen and wounded 25 others when he attacked their base in the volatile city of Baquba.

== November ==
- November 1: A suicide truck bomber targeting an Iraqi army base killed five people, including three soldiers, and wounded 18 civilians and soldiers in the town of Saadiya.
- November 7: At least 12 people were wounded in a suicide car bomb attack on the Kurdistan Democratic Party headquarters in Kirkuk.
- November 8: One woman was killed and five people were wounded when a suicide car bomber exploded near the Kurdistan Democratic Party headquarters in the village of Tal Asquf, north of the northern city of Mosul.
- November 9: A suicide bomber killed five Sunni Arab tribal leaders in the village of Dojemah, near the town of Khalis.
- November 15: The head of a Sunni tribe was killed and 10 members of the tribe wounded when a suicide bomber wearing a vest packed with explosives infiltrated their meeting in the town of Iskandariya.
- November 16: U.S. military officials killed a suicide bomber wearing a vest loaded with grenades before he could detonate himself in Baghdad.
- November 25: One Iraqi soldier was killed and four were wounded when Iraqi forces opened fire on a suicide truck bomber speeding towards a checkpoint in the city of Kirkuk. Three soldiers were still missing after the truck exploded.
- November 26: A suicide truck bomber killed one soldier and wounded five others in an attack on an Iraqi army checkpoint in the Al-Zab area.
- November 27: A suicide bomber posing as a shepherd killed four policemen and two civilians and wounded 13 others, including six policemen, in an attack on the Diyala province police headquarters in the city of Baquba.
- November 30: One Iraqi police captain was killed and two other policemen were wounded when a suspected al Qaeda member blew himself up as they entered his home to arrest him in the town of Dhuluwiya.

== December ==
- December 1: A suicide bomber killed one civilian and wounded five others in Salman Pak.
- December 4: A suicide bomber wearing a vest carried out an attack on a police station near a busy market, killing six people and wounding 25 in Jalawla.
- December 7: A female suicide bomber wearing a vest packed with explosives killed 16 people and wounded 27 in the town of Muqdadiya.
- December 9: A suicide car bomb targeted an Iraqi army checkpoint, killing two soldiers and wounding seven others in western Baiji.
- December 10: A suicide car bomber killed one Iraqi soldier and wounded two others in an attack on a checkpoint in the city of Baiji.
- December 11: A suicide car bomb exploded near the homes of senior Iraqi politicians in a heavily guarded neighbourhood of western Baghdad, killing two people and wounding 12. A suicide car bomber killed one U.S. soldier and wounded two others in an attack in Salahuddin province north of Baghdad.
- December 13: Two suicide bombers struck an Iraqi army base in the town of Riyadh, killing seven soldiers and wounding 15.
- December 15: A suicide car bomber detonated prematurely before reaching a police checkpoint in Bayaa district in southwestern Baghdad, killing one civilian and wounding three.
- December 20: A suicide bomber wearing a belt packed with explosives struck a recruiting station for neighborhood patrols in the town of Kanaan in restive Diyala province. Police said 13 volunteers were killed and 10 wounded. The U.S. military said a U.S. soldier was killed and 10 U.S. soldiers were wounded.
- December 22: A suicide bomber blew himself up near an Iraqi police and army checkpoint in western Baghdad, killing four people and wounding six.
- December 24: A suicide bomber killed seven police and wounded 30 more in an attack on a police station in Muqdadiya.
- December 25: A suicide truck bomb killed at least 23 people and wounded 77 in the northern Iraqi city of Baiji.
- December 31: A suicide bomber wearing an explosive vest killed four Iraqi neighbourhood patrol volunteers and wounded two others at a checkpoint on Baghdad's northern outskirts. A female suicide bomber wounded two policemen and five civilians including a child when she attacked a police station in Baquba.

== See also ==
- List of 2007 suicide bombings in Iraq
