= Timeline of the Iraq War =

Sequence of events in the US invasion of Iraq

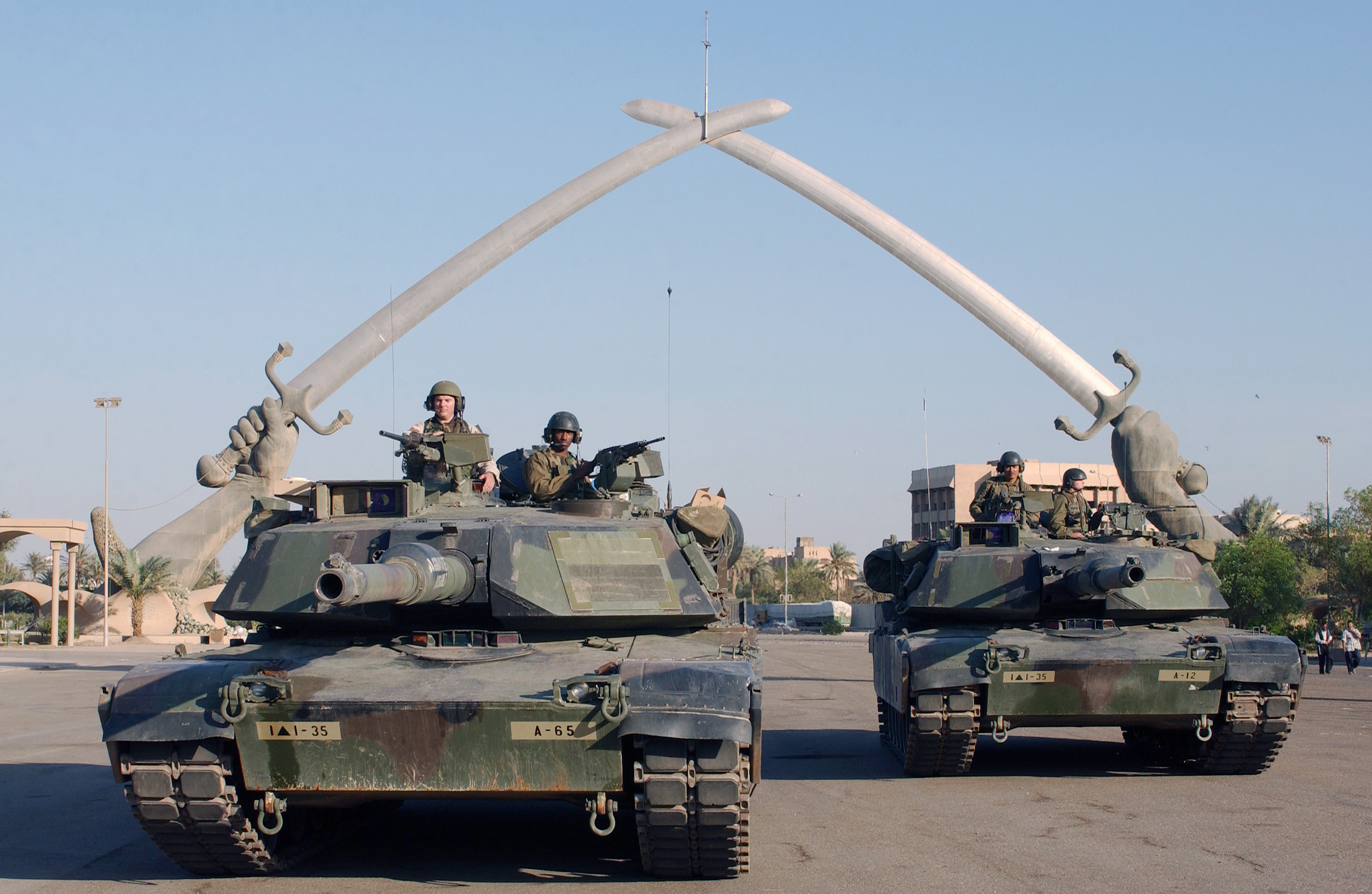
M1A1 Abrams pose for a photo under the "Hands of Victory" in Grand Festivities Square, Baghdad, Iraq.

The following is a timeline of major events during the Iraq War, following the 2003 invasion of Iraq.

== 2003 ==
=== March ===
- March 20: The United States begins the invasion of Iraq; coordinating a satellite-guided Tomahawk cruise missile strike on Baghdad. American, British, Australian, Polish, and Danish military operations begin; ground troops move into Iraq.

=== April ===
- April 9: Fall of Baghdad: Coalition forces moved into Baghdad, symbolically ending the twenty-four year reign of Iraqi President Saddam Hussein.

=== May ===
- May 1: U.S. President George W. Bush declares major combat operations in Iraq over.
- May 15 - U.S. forces launch Operation Planet X, capturing roughly 260 people.
- May 23 - L. Paul Bremer issues Coalition Provisional Authority Order Number 2, dissolving the Iraqi Army and other entities of the former Ba'athist state. U.S. forces seized a truck carrying 36 tons of gold-colored bars made mostly out of copper near the Syrian border. Afterwards, they were handed over to the appropriate authorities for disposition.

=== June ===
- June 15: The U.S. military begins Operation Desert Scorpion, a series of raids across Iraq intended to find Iraqi resistance and heavy weapons.
- June 24 - Six soldiers from the British Royal Military Police are killed by a mob in Majar al-Kabir in Southern Iraq.

=== July ===
- July 2: U.S. President George W. Bush challenges those attacking U.S. troops to "bring 'em on!".
- July 13: The Iraqi Governing Council is established under the authority of the Coalition Provisional Authority.
- July 22: Uday and Qusay Hussein, Saddam Hussein's sons, are killed in Mosul during a raid by Task Force 20.

=== August ===
- August 7: Bus bombing of the Jordanian embassy, the first VBIED bombing of the occupation.
- August 19: Canal Hotel bombing: Truck bomb at the United Nations headquarters kills the top UN envoy, Sergio Vieira de Mello, and 21 others.
- August 29: Influential Shiite cleric Ayatollah Mohammed Baqr al-Hakim is killed in a car bombing as he leaves his mosque after Friday prayers. At least 84 others are killed.

=== September ===
- September 3: First post-Saddam government.
- September 23: Gallup poll shows majority of Iraqis expect better life in 5 years. Around two-thirds of Baghdad residents state the Iraqi dictator's removal was worth the hardships they've been forced to endure.

=== October ===
- October 2: David Kay's Iraq Survey Group report finds little evidence of WMD in Iraq, although the regime did intend to develop more weapons with additional capabilities. Such plans and programs appear to have been dormant, the existence of these though were concealed from UNSCOM during the inspections that began in 2002. Weapons inspectors in Iraq did find a clandestine "network of biological laboratories" and a deadly strain of botulinum. The US-sponsored search for WMD has so far cost $300 million and is projected to cost around $600 million more.
- October 16: UN Security Council issues Resolution 1511 which envisions a multinational force and preserves Washington's quasi-absolute control of Iraq.
- October 27: 27 October 2003 Baghdad bombings, beginning of the Ramadan Offensive.

=== November ===
- November 2: In the heaviest single loss for the coalition troops up to that time, two US Chinook helicopters are fired on by two surface-to-air missiles and one crashes near Fallujah and on its way to Baghdad airport; 16 soldiers are killed and 20 wounded.
- November 12: A suicide truck bomb blows up the Italian headquarters in Nasiriyah, killing 19 Italians (17 of them soldiers) and 14 Iraqis.
- November 15: The Governing Council unveils an accelerated timetable for transferring the country to Iraqi control.
- November 22: 2003 Baghdad DHL attempted shoot down incident: An Airbus A-300 freighter belonging to German courier firm DHL is forced to make an emergency landing with a wing fire and all three hydraulics lost. Using differential engine thrust to land the aircraft, after being struck by a portable shoulder-fired SA-14 missile.
- November 27: U.S. President George W. Bush makes a stealthy Thanksgiving Day visit to Baghdad (the White House having announced that he would be at home with his family) in an attempt to boost morale among the troops and ordinary Iraqis. Bush is accompanied by National Security Advisor Condoleezza Rice, and he is flown in to Baghdad International Airport aboard Air Force One.
- November 30: The US military reports killing 46 militants and wounding 18 in clashes in the central city of Samarra. The reports are later called into question as reporters interview residents of the city. Hospital staff only reports 8 dead - most or all of them civilians. No bodies of dead guerillas are found.

=== December ===
- December 13: Saddam Hussein is captured in Operation Red Dawn; it was announced the next day.
- December 17: The U.S. 4th Infantry Division launches Operation Ivy Blizzard, lasting from dawn until mid-morning. The operation resulted in the arrest of 12 insurgents.
- December 27: 2003 Karbala bombings.

== 2004 ==
=== January ===
- January 26: The Japanese Iraq Reconstruction and Support Group is deployed to Iraq.
- January 28: David Kay testifies before the Senate Armed Services Committee expressing doubt about the presence of Iraqi weapons of mass destruction.

=== February ===
- February 1: Two suicide bombers strike Kurdish political offices in the northern city of Erbil, killing 117 and injuring 133.
- February 21: U.S. permits Red Cross to visit Saddam Hussein for first time since his capture in December.

=== March ===
- March 2: Multiple bombings in Baghdad and Karbala at the climax of the Shi'a festival of Aashurah kill nearly 200, the deadliest attacks up to that time.
- March 8: Provisional Iraqi Constitution signed.
- March 31: 31 March 2004 Fallujah ambush: Four Blackwater contractors ambushed and killed in Fallujah, causing a First Battle of Fallujah.

=== April ===
- April 4: Beginning of violent clashes between the coalition and followers of Shia cleric Muqtada al-Sadr, which will end at the end of August 2004.
- April 8: Beginning of the kidnapping of foreign civilians in Iraq, with the abduction of several Japanese.
- April 18: Spain, led by newly elected José Luis Rodríguez Zapatero (Socialist Party) vows to withdraw its troops.
- April 18: Abu Ghraib torture and prisoner abuse; Beginning of the diffusion of images of humiliated Iraqi detainees by US soldiers in Abu Ghraib.
- April 26: The Iraq Interim Governing Council announce a new flag for post-Saddam Iraq. This creates much controversy, in part because of the similarity of color and design with the flag of Israel, and difference with other Arab nation flags. The flag is not adopted.

=== May ===
- May 17: Ezzedine Salim, head of the Iraqi Governing Council, killed in a suicide attack.
- May 19: Mukaradeeb killings; US bombs a wedding party, killing 42 people.

=== June ===
- June 1: Assuming of functions of the Iraqi Interim Government led by Prime minister Iyad Allawi; Ghazi al-Yawer is designed head of the Iraqi state.
- June 8: UN Security Council Resolution 1546 on the transfer of sovereignty from the Coalition Provisional Authority to the Iraqi Interim Government.
- June 21: 2004 Iranian seizure of Royal Navy personnel
- June 28: At 10:26 am, the US-led Coalition Provisional Authority formally transferred sovereignty of Iraqi territory to the Iraqi interim government, two days ahead of schedule. L. Paul Bremer departed the country two hours later.
- June 30: Saddam Hussein and eleven high ex-governmental figures are put under the Iraqi Interim Government's authority.

=== July ===
- July 1: Trial of Saddam Hussein: Saddam Hussein appears at his first hearing.
- July 20: Gloria Macapagal Arroyo, president of the Philippines, confirms that hostage Angelo dela Cruz has been freed by his captors after their demands for a one-month-early withdrawal of all 51 Filipino troops from Iraq were met.

=== August ===
- August 5–27: Forces loyal to Muqtada al-Sadr resist government authority in Najaf; the fighting is ended with Grand Ayatollah Ali al-Sistani's help.

=== September ===
- September 14: The Haifa Street helicopter incident kills 13 Iraqis and is televised around the world.
- September 30: A car strikes an American officer handing out candy to children, killing up to 35 children.

=== October ===
- October 1: Battle of Samarra (2004)
- 17 October: Al-Zarqawi pledged allegiance to al-Qaeda network
- Late October: The Al Qa'qaa high explosives controversy comes to light.

=== November ===
- November 7: Second Battle of Fallujah begins.
- November 8: Insurgents regroup and begin the Battle of Mosul.

=== December ===
- December 21: 2004 Forward Operating Base Marez bombing kills 22, including 18 Americans.

== 2005 ==
=== January ===
- January 30: Iraqi legislative election. The Shia United Iraqi Alliance obtained a majority, followed by the Kurdish Alliance; Sunnis largely boycotted.

=== February ===
- February 28: 2005 Al Hillah bombing: In the deadliest single blast up to that time, a car bomb kills 127 in Hillah; the identity of the bomber as a Jordanian caused a diplomatic row between Iraq and Jordan.

=== March ===
- March 4: Rescue of Giuliana Sgrena: Liberation of Italian journalist Giuliana Sgrena, during which secret Italian agent Nicola Calipari is killed by US fire. Berlusconi's government announces a partial retreat of Italian troops from the coalition.
- March 16 First meeting of the transitional National Assembly.
- March 31: The Iraqi Intelligence Commission concludes in its final report that prewar intelligence regarding WMD's was false.

=== April ===
- April 2: Battle of Abu Ghraib
- April 6: Election of Kurdish Jalal Talabani as President of Iraq.
- April 7: Ibrahim al-Jaafari is nominated as Prime minister of Iraq.
- April 28: The Parliament votes its trust towards the new government.

=== May ===
- May 8: Battle of Al Qaim, US aiming to stop the flow of foreign fighters into Iraq.
- May 15 Formation of the parliamentary commission charged of the draft of the new Constitution.

=== July ===
- July 19: 2005 Musayyib bombing kills nearly 100 Shia.

=== August ===
- August 1–4: Battle of Haditha
- August 15: Unable to find a consensus between the main political leaders, the Parliament postpones for a week the transmission of the draft constitution to its members.
- August 22: The constitution's draft is presented to the Iraqi Parliament.
- August 28: The constitution is presented to parliament.
- August 31: 2005 Baghdad bridge stampede: Rumors of a suicide bomber lead to a stampede on the Al-Aaimmah bridge; about 1,000 people died.

=== September ===
- September 1: Battle of Tal Afar: US troops launch an offensive in Tal Afar, a city that would become a "model" for the Americans.
- September 14: 14 September 2005 Baghdad bombings: In the deadliest day of the insurgency in Baghdad, bombs kill 160 and injure more than 500.
- September 19: Basra prison incident: British troops storm a police station in Basra to free two soldiers being held there.
- September 29: Bombings in Balad kill at least 95.

=== October ===
- October 15: 2005 Iraqi constitutional referendum: Voters approve Iraq's new constitution.
- Oct. 19: Start of Saddam Hussein's trial.
- Oct. 24 – The Palestine Hotel and the Sheraton Ishtar hotel in Baghdad are hit by truck bombs; the attacks are captured on film.

=== November ===
- Nov. 5: Operation Steel Curtain launched to root out foreign fighters.
- Nov. 15 - 173 prisoners are found in an Iraqi government bunker in Baghdad, having been starved, beaten and tortured.
- Nov. 18: Bombings in Khanaqin kill at least 74.
- Nov. 19: Haditha killings: American soldiers kill 24 people, including 15 noncombatants, in Haditha, after an insurgent attack.
- Nov. 25: 2005–2006 Christian Peacemaker hostage crisis begins.

=== December ===
- December 14 - U.S. President George W. Bush says that the decision to invade Iraq in 2003 was the result of faulty intelligence, and accepts responsibility for that decision. He maintains that his decision was still justified.
- December 15: December 2005 Iraqi legislative election

== 2006 ==
=== February ===
- February 22 The al-Askari Mosque bombing (2006): Shi’ite Al Askari Mosque is bombed by Sunni militants, sparking a sectarian civil war. Shi’ite, Sunni and other militant groups also start advancing within Baghdad.

=== March ===
- March 12: Mahmudiyah killings.

=== April ===
- April 24: Hamdania incident. Marines allegedly abduct an Iraqi civilian from a house, kill him, and place components and spent AK-47 cartridges near his body to make it appear he was planting an IED.

=== May ===
- May 20 The new Iraqi government, which succeeds to the Iraqi Transitional Government, begins its functions.

=== June ===
- June 7 Abu Musab al-Zarqawi is killed.
- June 14: Operation Together Forward begins.
- June 17: Battle of Ramadi (2006) begins.

=== July ===
- July 9: Hay al Jihad massacre - Shia militias kill 40 Sunnis.
- July 23: Two powerful bombs in Baghdad's Sadr City neighborhood kill at least 66.
- July 24 Saddam Hussein, 69, the deposed former Iraqi President, is force-fed in a Baghdad hospital through a tube after 16 days of hunger strike.
- July 25 Operation River Falcon begins.

=== October ===
- Oct. 19: Battle of Amarah. Clashes erupt between the Mahdi Army and the Badr Organization.
- Oct. 28: The first of the Chlorine bombings in Iraq.

=== November ===
- November 7 - The United States midterm elections removed the Republican Party from control of both chambers of the United States Congress. The failings in the Iraq War were cited as one of the main causes of the Republicans' defeat, even though the Bush administration had attempted to distance itself from its earlier "stay the course" rhetoric.
- November 19: Ammar al-Saffar, Deputy Health Minister, becomes the highest-ranking Iraqi to be kidnapped.
- 23 November 2006 Sadr City bombings kill more than 200 Shias in Sadr City.

=== December ===
- December 6: The Iraq Study Group releases their final report.
- December 21: 2006 US raid on Iranian diplomats
- December 25: Diyala campaign begins.
- Dec. 30: Execution of Saddam Hussein.

== 2007 ==
=== January ===
- January 10: The Iraq War troop surge of 2007 is announced.
- January 11: US raid on Iranian Liaison Office in Arbil.
- January 20: The Karbala provincial headquarters raid results in the kidnapping and killing of five American soldiers. The US blames Iran.
- January 28: Followers of the Shia cult Soldiers of Heaven initiate the Battle of Najaf (2007), which left nearly 300 dead.

=== February ===
- February 3: A bomb in Baghdad market kills 135 people.
- February 6: Baghdad kidnapping of Iranian diplomat.
- February 27: Siege of U.K. bases in Basra begins.

=== March ===
- March 6: 2007 Al Hillah bombings kill 120 Shias.
- March 23: 2007 Iranian seizure of Royal Navy personnel: Iran seizes 15 British Royal Navy personnel patrolling near Iraq, who are released on 4 April.
- March 27: A bombing in Tal Afar, which killed 152, set off Shia retaliation which left 70 Sunnis dead.
- March 29: Suicide bombings in Baghdad kill 82 Shias.
- Battle of Baqubah.

=== April ===
- April 6: Operation Black Eagle. Fighting between Coalition forces and the Madhi Army.
- April 18: Bombings across Baghdad kill nearly 200.
- April 23: 2007 Mosul massacre of Yazidi workers, in revenge for the Stoning of Du'a Khalil Aswad.

=== May ===
- The Iraq oil law (2007) is proposed.

=== June ===
- June 13: 2007 al-Askari Mosque bombing blows up two of the mosque's minarets.
- June 16: Operation Phantom Thunder begins.

=== July ===
- July 12: The Initial Benchmark Assessment Report is released.
- July 16: The 2007 Kirkuk bombings kill 86.
- July 17: Truck bomb in Amirli kills 156.
- July 26: A Baghdad market is bombed, killing 92.

=== August ===
- Operation Phantom Strike begins.
- August 14: 2007 Yazidi communities bombings. In the most deadly insurgent strikes to date, four bombings in Kahtaniya and Jazeera, in northern Iraq, strike Yazidi communities, killing 796 people and injuring more than 1,500.

=== September ===
- The Nisour Square massacre in Baghdad killed 17 Iraqi civilians.

== 2008 ==
=== January ===
- January 8: Operation Phantom Phoenix begins.
- January 18: 2008 Iraqi Day of Ashura fighting.
- January 23: Ninawa campaign begins.

=== February ===
- Bombings in Baghdad kill 98.
- February 21: 2008 Turkish incursion into northern Iraq Turkey launches an offensive in northern Iraq against PKK rebels.

=== March ===
- March 23: Iraq spring fighting of 2008.
- March 25: Battle of Basra (2008).

=== July ===
- July 29: Operation Augurs of Prosperity launched.

=== October ===
- Oct. 26: 2008 Abu Kamal raid into Syria.

=== November ===
- 2008 attacks on Christians in Mosul
- The U.S.-Iraq Status of Forces Agreement, which stipulates that U.S. troops will be out of Iraq by the end of 2011, is approved and ratified by the Iraqi Parliament.

== 2009 ==
=== January ===
- January 31: 2009 Iraqi governorate elections
- A total of 191 Iraqis were killed in violence during January, the lowest monthly toll since the US-led invasion of March 2003. Sixteen U.S. troops died in Iraq during this month.

=== May ===
- May 11: Camp Liberty killings
- May 28: The last of the U.K.'s combat troops are withdrawn.

=== July 25 ===
- 2009 Iraqi Kurdistan legislative election

=== August ===
- 19 August 2009 Baghdad bombings kill 101.

=== October ===
- 25 October 2009 Baghdad bombings kill 155.

=== December ===
- 8 December 2009 Baghdad bombings kill 127.
- December 31: The US suffers only four troop deaths, and no combat deaths, the lowest figure since the war began.

== 2010 ==
=== March ===
- March 7: 2010 Iraqi parliamentary election

=== April ===
- April 18: Islamic State of Iraq leaders Abu Ayyub al-Masri and Abu Omar al-Baghdadi are killed in a joint U.S.-Iraqi operation near Tikrit, Iraq.

=== August ===
- August 18: American combat operations in Iraq end as its last combat brigade departs for Kuwait.

=== September ===
- September 30: 3rd Armored Cavalry Regiment conducted a Transition of Authority with 3rd BDE, 3rd ID and assumed responsibility for the five northern Provinces of United States Division-South under MG Vincent Brooks and the 1st Infantry Division.
