= Mustansiriya University bombings =

2007 terrorist attack in Iraq

- Part of the Iraq War, Iraqi insurgency, and the Iraqi civil war
- Location: Baghdad, Iraq
- Date: January 16, 2007 (UTC+3)
- Target: Students and staff at Mustansiriya University
- Attack type: School bombings, suicide attack and car bombs
- Deaths: approx. 70
- Injuries: 169
- Perpetrator: Unknown
- Motive: Anti-Shi'ism

The Mustansiriya University bombings was a series of bombing attacks at students and teachers at the largely Shiite Mustansiriya University in Baghdad, Iraq, on January 16, 2007. Some 70 people were killed and 169 were wounded.

== See also ==
- 2007 suicide bombings in Iraq
