= 2007 al-Khilani mosque bombing =

Terrorist attack in Baghdad, Iraq

Al-Khilani mosque bombing
- Location: Baghdad, Iraq
- Date: 19 June 2007
- Target: Al-Khilani Shia mosque
- Attack type: Car bomb
- Deaths: 78-87
- Injuries: 218

The al-Khilani mosque bombing occurred on 19 June 2007 when a truck bomb exploded in front of the Shia Al-Khilani Mosque in Baghdad, Iraq. At least 78 people were killed and another 218 injured in the blast. The explosion occurred just two days after a four-day curfew banning vehicle movement in the city was lifted after the al-Askari Mosque bombing (2007), and just hours after 10,000 US troops began the Arrowhead Ripper offensive to the north of Baghdad. Because the site was a Shia mosque, the bombing is presumed to have been the work of Sunnis. The Sinak area where the explosion took place was also the targeted by a suicide car bomber on 28 May 2007, which resulted in 21 deaths.

== Significance of the mosque ==
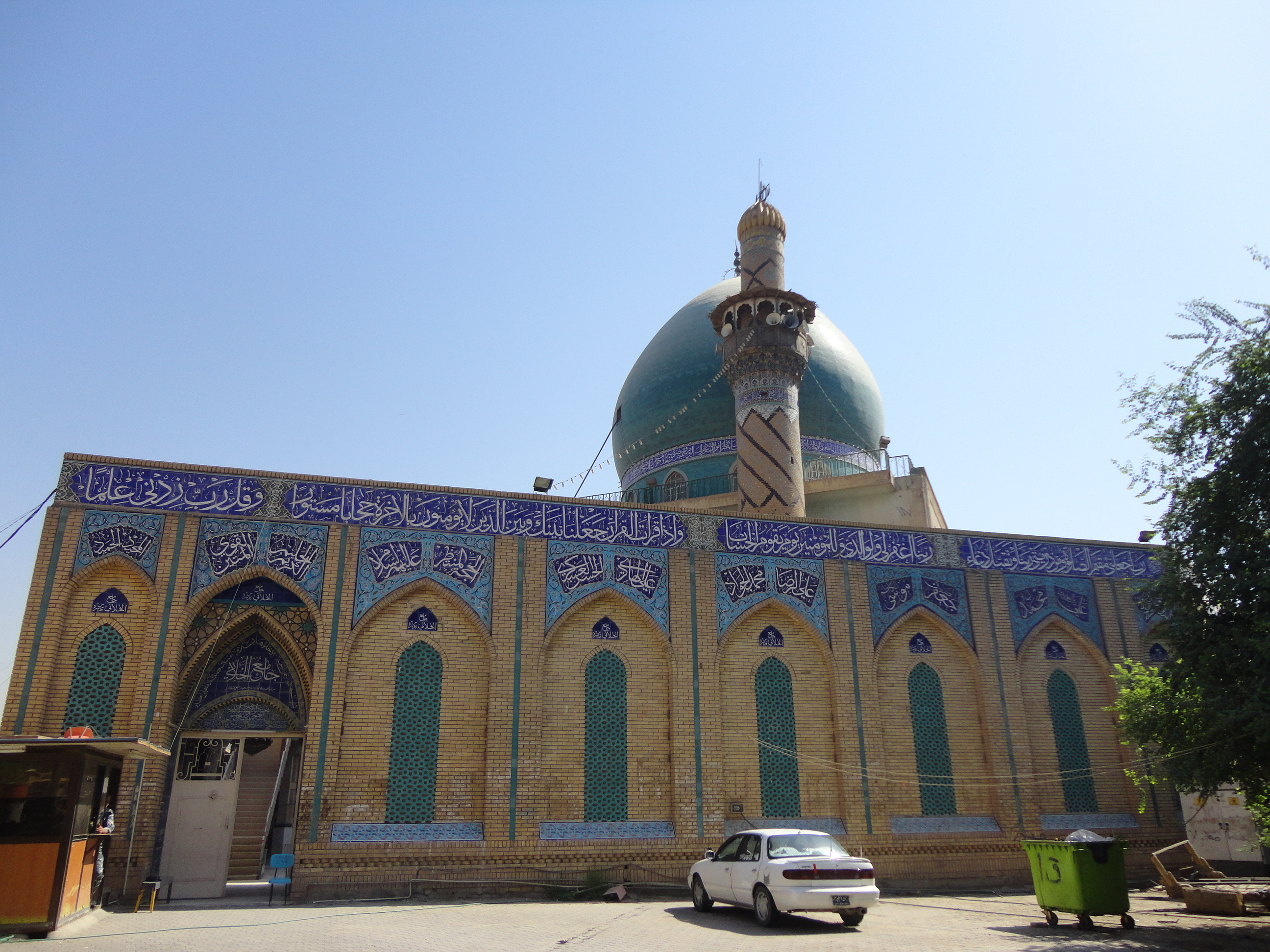
Al-Khilani Mosque, 2012

The al-Khulani mosque was named by the Shia in honor of one of their revered four "earthly" deputies anointed by the Imam Mohammed al-Mahdi (the so-called "Hidden Imam" who disappeared in the 9th century).

== The attack ==
Iraq Police said a truck stacked with electric fans and air conditioners was used to deliver the bomb to a parking lot near the Khulani mosque. The U.S. military offered a different version of events, declaring that "the truck was loaded with propane tanks and that a suicide driver detonated his bomb when the vehicle became stuck trying to drive over a curb". A preliminary investigation indicated that the truck used in the attack "was rigged with TNT a little less than a mile from where it exploded". The bomb was set off around 1:45 pm local time (10:45 GMT) outside the mosque which is located in the busy Sinak commercial district of central Baghdad.

Jabbar Mohammed al-Kaissi, an eyewitness to the blast was across the street filling a five-liter gas can "when a truck carrying what he estimated was 60 canisters of gas exploded, sending canisters flying through the air, creating secondary explosions when they landed as far as 100 yards away." He saw a ball of fire rise into the air and turning back to see the car holding his wife and three daughters saw the wall of the mosque fall on it crushing and killing them. "I was frozen by the shock. As I rushed to the car to see if I could save any of them, the gas canisters started to explode one after the other."

Besides causing the collapse of the courtyard wall the explosion also destroyed a building just inside the mosque compound. The mosque sanctuary was damaged slightly and the mosque's turquoise dome remained standing. The blast badly burned many worshippers and the resulting rubble buried others. The mosque's imam, Sheik Saleh al-Haidari said the bomb was especially deadly as worshippers were just leaving a prayer service. At least 78 were slain and more than 218 were wounded. Six of the slain had lived in a house behind the mosque. Twenty cars outside the mosque were incinerated and twenty-five nearby shops suffered damages from the attack. Imam Haidari went on to say "This attack was planned and carried out by sick souls", and that though he was not in the mosque at the time, his office and the room above collapsed in the explosion. Karim Abdullah an eyewitness who was headed to pray at the mosques reported "I stopped in shock as I saw the smoke and people on the ground. I saw two or three men in flames as they were getting out of their car." Gunfire was heard in the area following the explosion. Iraqi state television showed "black smoke billowing above the skyline as people on the street screamed in anguish. ...storefronts were crumbled and on fire, and more than a dozen nearby cars were set ablaze. Residents walked through the area collecting body parts and unrecognizable chunks of flesh." Many of the casualties were rushed to the nearby Al Kanadi, Al Sadr and Madinat Al Tob hospitals.

== Reactions ==
Prime Minister Nouri al-Maliki condemned the attack he issued a statement blaming the attack on "takfiris and terrorists who are focused on violating the sanctuaries and killing innocent lives" and said "It shows the determination of Saddamists and Takfiris to ignite sectarian violence. [The bombing] scarred the beautiful face of Baghdad by destroying the religious landmarks it has known over the centuries."

The deaths at al-Khilani mosque rose the total of Baghdad deaths due to sectarian violence for Tuesday 19 June 2007 to 142 "a toll reflecting carnage associated with the months before the U.S. security crackdown in the capital began 14 February." The bombing was the deadliest single attack since a car bomb in a Shiite dominated market killed 127 in central Baghdad on 18 April 2007. Col. Christopher C. Garver a spokesman for the U.S. military, said the bombing "demonstrates why [the ongoing operation] Arrowhead Ripper and other operations we'll be conducting this summer are so important. We have to find the car bombs and suicide bombers to prevent this from happening." Iraqi Brig. Gen. Qassim Atta, said that the bombing is a sign of shifting tactics – instead of building vehicle bombs outside of the city "insurgents are now building car bombs inside Baghdad, hoping to avoid driving through the city and being detected at newly erected security checkpoints."

== See also ==
- 2007 suicide bombings in Iraq
