= February 2007 Al-Saydiya market bombing =

2007 truck bombing of a market in Baghdad, Iraq

Coordinates: 33.3157°N 44.3922°E

Al-Saydiya market bombing
- Part of the Iraq War, Iraqi insurgency, and the Iraqi civil war
- Location: Baghdad, Iraq
- Date: 3 February 2007 (UTC+3)
- Target: Al-Saydiya market
- Attack type: Murder-suicide truck bombing
- Weapon: Truck bombs
- Deaths: 135
- Injuries: 339
- Perpetrator: Unknown
- Motive: Anti-Shi'ism

The February 2007 Al-Saydiya market bombing was the detonation of a large truck bomb in a busy market in the Iraqi capital of Baghdad. The suicide attack killed at least 135 people and injured 339 others. The bomb, estimated to be about one ton in weight, brought down at least 10 buildings and coffee shops and obliterated market stalls in a largely Shi‘ite enclave less than a half-mile from the Tigris River.

== Casualties and aftermath ==
The attacks killed at least 135 and injured 339 others, making it the deadliest attack since the Sadr City bombings of 23 November 2006. The blast was the worst of four massive bomb attacks in the preceding three weeks, all targeting dense Shi'ite areas in Baghdad and Al Hillah, including an attack on 22 January 2007 in another central Baghdad market that killed at least 88 and injured more than 160. The same market was hit by a series of car bombs on 2 December 2006, which killed more than 50 people. After the explosion, the closest hospital was quickly overwhelmed with patients affected by the blast. A Health Ministry official said the death toll was likely to rise significantly. The Iraqi Interior Ministry estimated that about 1,000 people had been killed throughout Iraq in the preceding week due to gunbattles, drive-by shootings and bomb attacks.

== Timing of the attacks ==
According to police, the attacker was driving a truck carrying food when the explosives detonated, destroying stores and stalls that had been set up in the busy outdoor Sadriyah market. Many people were looking to purchase food before a curfew scheduled for that evening; it is likely the suicide bombers planned this in order to cause maximum casualties.

== See also ==
- 2007 suicide bombings in Iraq
- 18 April 2007 Baghdad bombings
- Civil war in Iraq
