= 29 March 2007 Baghdad bombings =

Suicide bombings in Baghdad, Iraq

- Location: Baghdad, Iraq
- Date: 29 March 2007 (UTC+3)
- Target: Al-Shaab market
- Attack type: Suicide bombings
- Deaths: 82
- Injuries: 138
- Perpetrator: Unknown: legal proceedings have not yet taken place.

The 29 March 2007 Baghdad bombings was a 29 March 2007, double suicide attack on the al-Shaab market in a Shiite district of northeastern Baghdad.

The two bombers, wearing explosive vests, walked into the Al-Shaab market as it was packed with shoppers and blew themselves up. The death toll eventually climbed to 82 killed and 138 people were also wounded.

== See also ==
- 2007 suicide bombings in Iraq
