= 2007 Amirli bombing =

2007 bomb attack in Iraq

- Amirli (Iraq) Location of Amirli within Iraq
- Location: Amirli, Iraq
- Date: 7 July 2007; 19 years ago
- Target: Shia Turkmens
- Attack type: Truck bomb; suicide attack
- Deaths: 156
- Injuries: 255
- Motive: Anti-Shi'ism

On 7 July 2007, a truck bomb suicide attack occurred in a market in the town of Amirli, Iraq, whose residents are mainly Shia Turkmens. The bombing killed 156 people with 255 injured.

== See also ==
- 2007 suicide bombings in Iraq
