= 2007 Al Hillah bombings =

Terrorist incident in Iraq

- Part of the Iraq War, Iraqi insurgency, and the Iraqi civil war
- Location: Al Hillah, Iraq
- Date: 6 March 2007
- Target: Shia pilgrims
- Attack type: suicide bombings
- Deaths: 200
- Injuries: at least 250
- Perpetrator: Unknown
- Motive: Anti-Shi'ism

The 2007 Al Hillah bombings killed 200 people, mostly Shia Muslims on a pilgrimage, on 6 March 2007 in Al Hillah, Iraq.

Two suicide bombers wearing explosive vests joined the huge crowds surging into the city for a traditional religious festival. The attack was just one of a few on a particularly bloody day for Iraq as almost 200 people were killed throughout the country.

== See also ==
- 2007 suicide bombings in Iraq
