= 2007 Tal Afar bombings and massacre =

2007 bomb attacks in Iraq

- Part of the Iraq War, Iraqi insurgency, and the Iraqi civil war
- Location: Tal Afar, Iraq
- Date: March 27, 2007 (UTC+3)
- Attack type: suicide truck bombings and reprisal summary executions
- Weapon: Truck bombs
- Deaths: 152
- Injuries: more than 347
- Perpetrator: Unknown
- Motive: Anti-Shi'ism

The 2007 Tal Afar bombings took place on March 27, 2007, when two truck bombs targeted Shia areas of the Turkmen town of Tal Afar, Iraq, killing 152 and wounding 347 people.
