= 18 April 2007 Baghdad bombings =

2007 series of car bombings throughout Baghdad, Iraq

- Part of the Iraq War, Iraqi insurgency, and the Iraqi civil war
- Location: Baghdad, Iraq
- Date: 18 April 2007 (UTC+3)
- Target: Sadriya, Sadr City, Karrada, al-Shurja
- Attack type: Car bombs
- Deaths: 198
- Injuries: 251
- Perpetrator: Unknown
- Motive: Anti-Shi'ism

The 18 April 2007 Baghdad bombings were a series of attacks that occurred when five car bombs exploded across Baghdad, the capital city of Iraq, on 18 April 2007, killing nearly 200 people.

The attacks targeted mainly Shia locations and civilians. The Sadriya market had already been struck by a massive truck bombing on 3 February 2007 and was in the process of being rebuilt when the attack took place. The bombings were reminiscent of the level of violence before Operation Law and Order was implemented to secure the Iraqi capital in February 2007.

The attacks came as Iraqi Prime Minister Nouri al-Maliki said that Iraqi forces would assume control of the country's security by the end of the year, and they also came as officials from more than 60 countries attended a UN conference in Geneva on the plight of Iraqi refugees.

== Bombings ==
The first attack occurred when a bomb detonated on a minibus in the Risafi neighborhood of Baghdad, killing four people and wounding six. A parked car in the Karrada neighborhood exploded afterward, killing 11 and wounding 13.

A suicide car bomber crashed his car into an Iraqi police checkpoint; the resulting explosion killed at least 41 people, including five Iraqi police officers, and wounded 76.

One hour later, the deadliest attack was in the al-Sadriya market in central Baghdad, where a powerful car bomb killed at least 140 people and wounded 148, according to an Iraqi hospital official. The bomb was reportedly left in a parked car and exploded at about 16:00 local time (1200 UTC) in the middle of a crowd of workers. The market was being rebuilt after it was destroyed by a bombing in February which killed more than 130 people.

Later in the day another suicide bomber blew himself up at the entrance to the Sadriya district of Baghdad killing two police officers and wounding eight.

=== Locations ===
- al-Shurja: Minibus bomb killed at least 4 people
- Karrada: Car bomb near private hospital killed at least 11
- Sadr City: Suicide car bomber killed at least 41 at a checkpoint
- Sadriya: Car bomb killed at least 140 at a market
- Sadriya: Suicide car bomber killed at least 2 at a checkpoint

== Aftermath ==
No group claimed responsibility for the attacks. US defense secretary Robert Gates, delivering remarks from Tel Aviv, claimed that Islamic State of Iraq might have perpetrated the attacks.

== See also ==
- 3 February 2007 Baghdad market bombing, the previous bombing of Sadriya market
- 2007 Karbala mosque bombings
