= Neighbourhoods of Baghdad =

The city of Baghdad is divided into 89 administrative neighbourhoods, gathered into nine administrative districts.

== Districts east of the Tigris (Rusafa) ==
=== Rusafa District ===
- 1. Sinak, al-Rashid Street
- 2. Al-Khulani Square (also al-Khilani), Al-Wathba Square, Shorjah
- 3. Abu Nawas
- 3. Haydar-Khana
- 4. Orphalia, Bataween
- 5. Al-Sa'adoon
- 6. Camp Gaylani
- 7. Sheikh Omar
- 8. Medical City
- 9. Bab al-Mu'adham
- 10. Mustansiriya
- 11. Nile
- 12. 14th July
- 13. Idrissi

=== Al-A'dhamiyya District ===
- 14. Adhamiyah neighbourhood
- 15. Al-Wazireya
- 16. Wziryya-industrial
- 18. Qahira
- 19. Gherai'at
- 20. Tunis
- 21. Hayy Ur
- 22. Sha'ab east
- 23. Sha'ab north
- 24. Sha'ab south
- 25. Rashdiya

=== Thawra District ===
- 26. Sadr City neighborhood
- 27. Habbibiyya
- 28. Ishbiliyya neighbourhood

=== 7 Nissan District ===
- 29. Al-Shaab Stadium, Bor Saeid sqr, al-Shaheed Monument (Martyr's Memorial)
- 30. Muthana, Zayouna
- 31. Ghadeer, Masaloon sqr
- 32.New Baghdad neighbourhood (Baghdad al-Jadida), Alef Dar, al-Khaleej
- 33. Habibiya, Dur al-Umal, Baladiyat
- 34. Mashtal, Ameen, Nafit, Rustomaniya
- 35. Fedhailia, Kamaliya
- 36. Al-Husseiniyya, Ma'amal, al-Rashid
- 37. Al-Ubedy, Ma'amil 2

=== Karadah District ===
- 38. Sinaa, Alwiyya, al-Wahda
- 39. Karradae In
- 40. Zuwiyya, al-Jadriyya
- 41. Karrada out, Arasat, Mesbah
- 42. Camp Sarah, Rasheed Camp road
- 43. Al-Rashid Camp
- 44. Industrial complex in Al-Za'franiya
- 45. Seaidya, Rabea'a
- 46. Al-Za'franiya

== Districts west of the Tigris (Karkh) ==
=== Karkh District ===
- 47. Shawaka, Haifa complex
- 48. Sheik Maaruf, Shaljia
- 49. Salhia
- 50. Karadat Maryam
- 51. Umm al-Khanzeer island, Presidential complex
- 52. Al-Kindi, Harithiyya
- 53. Zawra park
- 54. Old al-Muthanna airport

=== Kadhimiya District ===
- 55. Utayfia
- 56. Kadhimiya 1
- 57. Kadhimiya 2
- 58. Ali Al Salih, Salam
- 59. Hurriya 1-5 (Al-Horaya)
- 60. Dabbash
- 61. Al-Shu'ala

=== Mansour District ===
- 62. Qadissiya
- 63. Mansour Neighbourhood, Dragh, Baghdad International Fair
- 64. Al-Washash
- 65. Iskan
- 66.14 Ramadan
- 67. Yarmouk
- 68. Safarat complex, Kafa'at
- 69. Al-A'amiriya
- 70. Al Khadhraa, Hayy Al-Jami'a
- 71. Al-Adel
- 72. Ghazaliya East
- 73. Ghazaliya west
- 74. Baghdad International Airport, Abu Ghraib road

=== Al Rashid District ===
- 75. Dora refinery
- 76. Dora, Athureen, Tua'ma
- 77. Al-Saydiya, Dhubat
- 78. Al-Saydiya
- 79. Bajas, Hayy Al-A'amel
- 80. Al-Jihad (Hayy Al-Jihad)
- 81. Al Atiba'a
- 82. Ajnadin, Hayy Al-Shurtta 4th & 5th
- 83. Al furat
- 84. Suwaib, Makasib
- 85. Resala, Qertan, Ewainy West
- 86. Ewairij
- 87. Saha, Hor Rejab
- 88. Mechanic, Asia
- 89. Bo'aitha

== See also ==
- List of neighborhoods and districts in Baghdad
- Administrative districts in Baghdad.
