= List of neighborhoods and districts in Baghdad =

This article lists neighborhoods and the nine administrative districts within 50 km of Baghdad, Iraq.

The order is not alphabetical, but is instead arranged according to whether the neighborhood is east or west of the Tigris and then grouped roughly by north–south order. Place names may be affected by differences in translation of Arabic to English. If sourced information on the location was not available, the neighborhood is grouped in the unknown section in alphabetical order. According to a report published by the New York Times on June 3, 2007, there are 457 distinct neighborhoods in Baghdad.

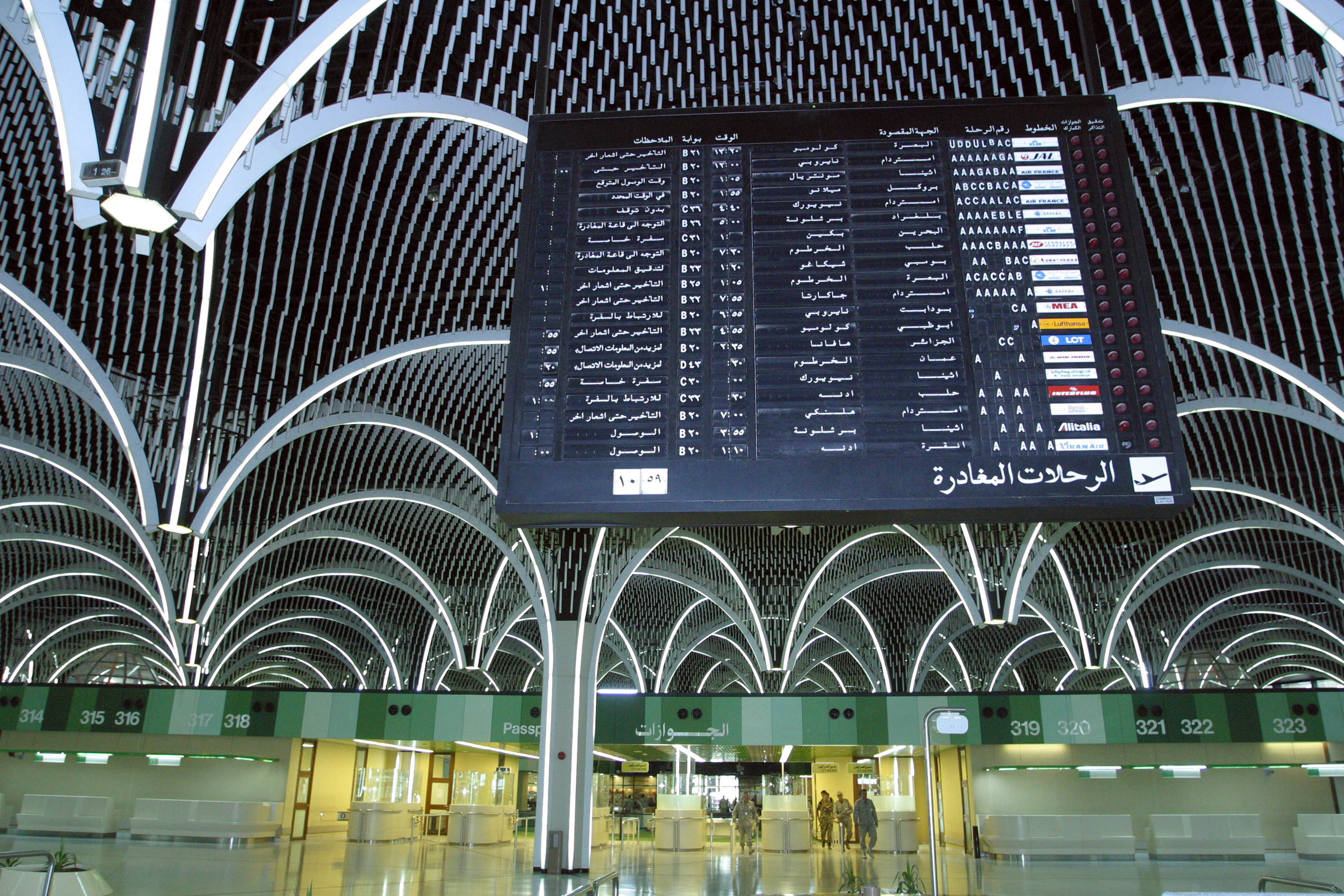
Baghdad International Airport

== West of the Tigris ==
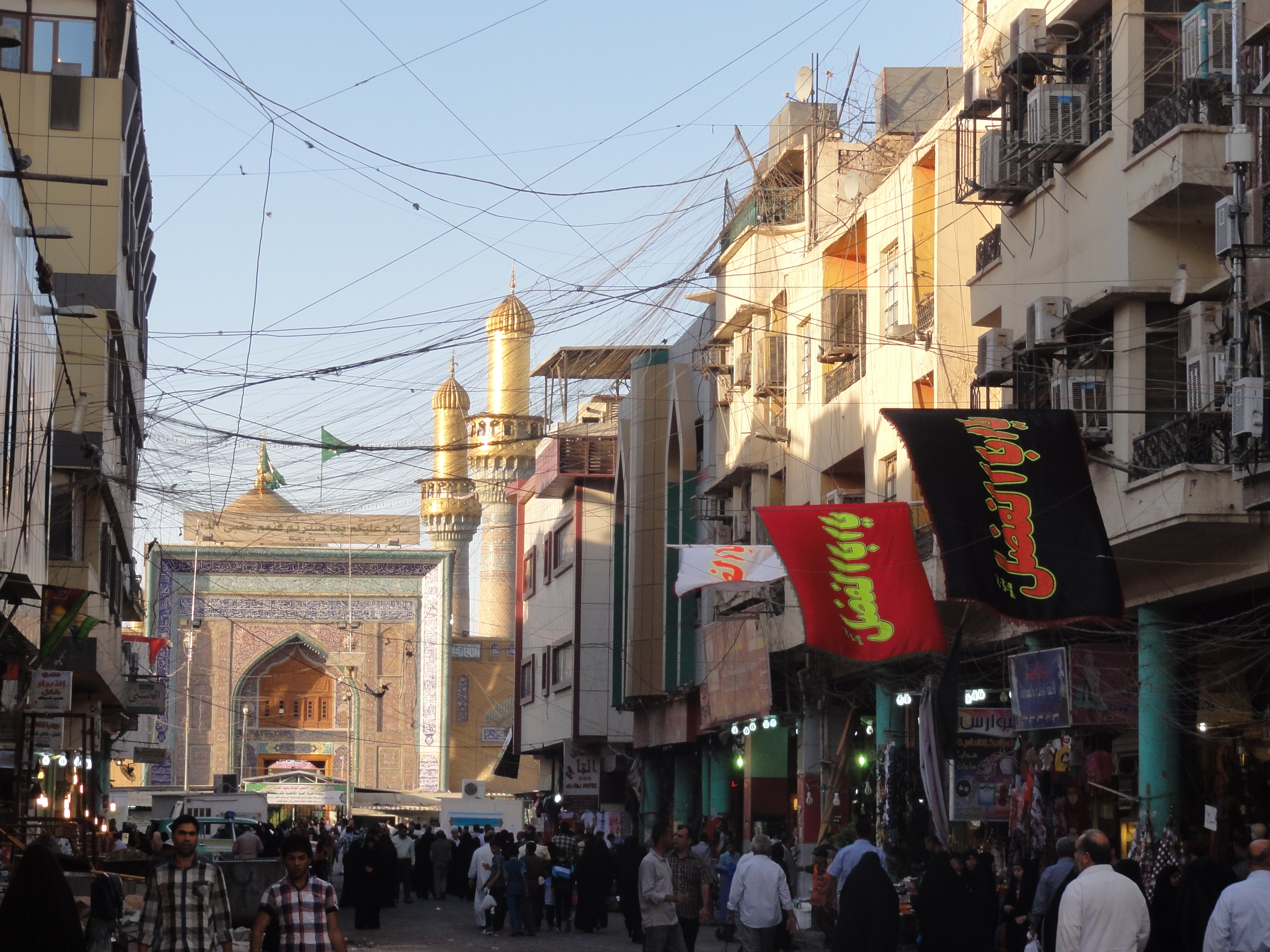

- Kadhimiya District
  - Al-Kadhimya
  - Al-Shu'ala
  - Utafiyah
  - Hurriya City
- Karkh District
  - Green Zone
- Mansour district
  - Al-Gazaliyah
  - Iskan
  - Washash
  - Al-Adel
  - Al-Jami'a
  - Al-Khadhraa
  - Mansour neighbourhood
  - Al-A'amiriya (Amiriya)
  - Yarmouk
- Al Rashid District
  - Hayy Al-A'amel (Amel or Amil): Just east of Jihad and west of Bayya’ along Baghdad Airport Road.
  - Al-Baya' (Baiyaa): East of Amil along Baghdad Airport Road.
  - Al-Jihad: Just east of Furat and west of Amil along Baghdad Airport Road,
  - Al-Shurtta (al-Shurta): A "middle- to working-class pocket in the dusty far west of Baghdad"
  - Muwasalat and Shurta Al-Khamsa neighborhood, just south of Bayya’
  - Swaib
  - Al-Saydiya
  - Al-Dora: largest neighborhood in the city
  - Al-Jadriyah (Baghdad)
  - Furat: Just east of Baghdad International Airport along Baghdad Airport Road

== East of the Tigris ==
- Adhamiyah District
  - Sha'ab City
  - Shaab-Ur: North of Sadr City
  - Hayy Ur
  - Al-Wazireya (Waziriyah)
  - Adhamiyah neighborhood
  - Just outside the Baghdad Wall from Adhamiyah are several smaller neighborhoods
    - Dilfiya
    - Maghrib
    - Kasra
    - Qahira
    - Sulaikh
    - Saba Abkar
    - Raghiba Khatoun area of Adhamiya
    - Ilaam
- Sadr City
- Rusafa District
  - Bab Al-Moatham
  - Fadhil: Sunni Arab neighborhood of multistory tenements along the east bank of the Tigris River, the oldest neighborhood in Baghdad
  - Sheikh Omar, near Fadhil
  - Sadriya
  - Shorja: this marketplace, established during the Abbasid period about 750 CE, is the city's oldest
  - Bab Al-Sharqi : Mixed area.
  - Al-Sa'adoon
  - Haydar-Khana: One of the oldest neighborhoods of Baghdad and contains the ancient Haydar-Khana Mosque.
- New Baghdad (Baghdad Al-Jadida) or 9 Nissan District
  - Zayouna: Mixed neighborhood.
- Karrada (Karradah) District
  - Al-Za'franiya: A semi-rural area on the outskirts of Baghdad squeezed between the Diyala and the Tigris rivers in south-eastern Baghdad.

== Unknown ==
- Khalis, northeast of Baghdad
- Palestine Street, Aqari district,
- Triangle of Death (Iraq)
  - Yusufiyah—40 km south of Baghdad
  - Mahmoudiyah 40 km south of Baghdad—Known as the “Gateway to Baghdad,”
  - Lutifiyah area of southwest Baghdad
- Mashada, 25 miles north of Baghdad
- Risafi—in northwestern Baghdad
- Taji, Iraq (Arabic: تاجي) is an area approximately 20 miles north of Baghdad, and the site of a large U.S.-controlled military base.
- Kamaliya—in southeastern Baghdad
- Al-Salam, also called Tobchi—in south Al-Hurriya

== See also ==
- Administrative districts in Baghdad
