= Administrative districts in Baghdad =

Administrative districts of Baghdad, Iraq

Coordinates: 33°20′N 44°23′E

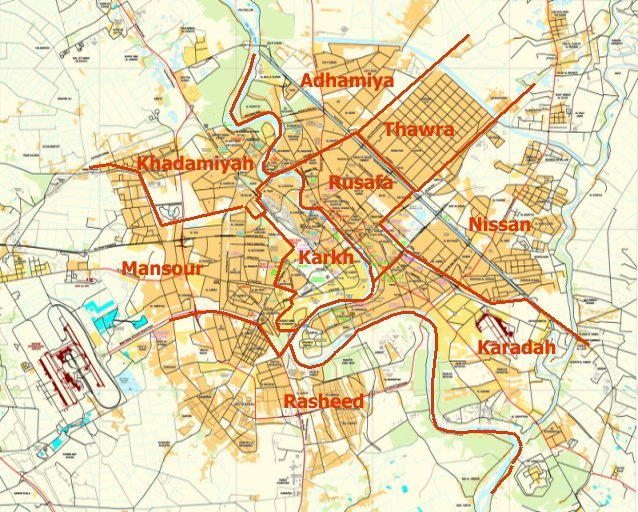
The districts of Baghdad

There are nine administrative districts in the city of Baghdad, the capital of Iraq, that correspond to the nine district advisory councils. The Baghdad Security Plan used these nine districts as the nine security districts. These were formed in 2003 following the 2003 U.S. invasion of Iraq. District council members are selected from the 89 Neighborhood Advisory Councils in Baghdad. The number of neighbourhood representatives on the district council is based upon the community's population. The Baghdad City Advisory Council consists of 37 members drawn from the district councils and is also based on the district's population.

In the list below, alternate spellings (in parentheses) are from United Nations humanitarian info.org map listing 89 neighborhoods.

== Districts east of the Tigris (Rusafa) ==
=== Rusafa District ===
- 1. Sinek (Sinak), Al Rasheed
- 2. Khulani, Al Wathba Square, Shorjah
- 3. Abu Nuwas
- 4. Orphalia, Bataween
- 5. Al-Sa'adoon (Al-Saadoon) Park
- 6. Camp Gaylani
- 7. Sheikh Omar
- 8. Medical City
- 9. Bab al-Mu'adham (Bab Al-Moatham)
- 10. Mustansiriya
- 11. Nile
- 12. Hayy 14 July
- 13. Idrissi

=== Adhamiyah District ===
- 14. Adhamiyah
- 15. Al-Wazireya (Waziriya)
- 16. Al-Wazireya-Industry (Waziriya-Industry)
- 17. Maghreb
- 18. Qahira
- 19. Gherai'at (Krai'at)
- 20. Tunis
- 21. Hayy Ur
- 25. Rashdiya

=== Sha'ab District ===
- Sha'ab
- Al Baidha
  - Al Bunook
  - Al Tarbiyah
  - Sumar
- Adan
- Al Jazaer
- Um Alkubur walghizlan

=== Sadr District (formerly Thawra District (Revolution District) ===
- 26. Ishbiliya
- 27. Habbibiya
- 28. Sadr City (formerly Saddam City and Thawra City)

=== 9 Nissan District ===
- 29. Al-Shaab Stadium, Bor Said Square, Al-Shaheed Monument (Martyr's Monument).
- 30. Al-Muthanna, Zayouna
- 31. Al Ghadeer, Maysaloon Square
- 32. Baghdad Al-Jadida (New Baghdad), Alef Dar, Al-Khaleej
- 33. Habibiya, Dur Al-Umal, Baladiyat
- 34. Mashtal, Ameen, Nafit, Rustomaniya (Rustomiya)
- 35. Fedhailia, Kamaliya
- 36. Al-Husseinia, Ma'amil, Al-Rasheed St.
- 37. Al-Ubedy (Obaydi), Ma'amil 2

=== Karadah District ===
- 38. Sinaa, Alwiya, Al-Wahda (Al-Wehda)
- 39. Inner Karrada
- 40. Zuwiya, Al-Jadriya
- 41. Outer Karrada, Arasat, Mesbah
- 42. Camp Sarah, Rasheed Camp Road

=== Al-Za'franiya District ===
- 43. Alwaleed
- 44. Rasheed
- 45. Shoumoukh
- 46. Orfali
- 47. Seaidya
- 48. Rabea'a
- 49. Al-Rasheed Camp

== Districts west of the Tigris (Karkh) ==
=== Karkh District ===
- 47. Shawaka, Haifa (Hayfa) Complex
- 48. Sheik Maaruf, Shaljia
- 49. Salhia
- 50. Karadat Maryam
- 51. Um Al-Khanzeer Island, Presidential Complex
- 52. Al-Kindi, Harithiya
- 53. Zawra Park
- 54. Muthenna Airbase (Old Al Muthanna Airport)

=== Kadhimiya District ===
- 55. Utayfia
- 56. Kadhimiya 1
- 57. Kadhimiya 2
- 58. Ali Al-Salih (Ali Al-Saleh), Salam
- 59. Hurriya (Hurriyah) 1-5
- 60. Dabbash
- 61. Al-Shu'ala

=== Mansour district ===
- 62. Qadissiya
- 63. Mansour, Dragh, Baghdad International Fair
- 64. Al-Washash
- 65. Iskan
- 66. 14 Ramadan
- 67. Yarmouk (Al-Yarmuk)
- 68. Safarat Complex, Kafa'at
- 69. Al-A'amiriya (Al-Amriya)
- 70. Al Khadhraa, Hayy Al-Jami'a (Al-Jamia'a)
- 71. Al-Adel (Al-Adil)
- 72. Ghazaliya East
- 73. Ghazaliya West
- 74. Baghdad International Airport, Abu Ghraib Road

=== Al Rashid District ===
- 75. Dora Refinery
- 76. Dora, Athureen, Tua'ma
- 77. Al-Saydiya, Dhubat
- 78. Al-Saydiya
- 79. Bajas, Hayy Al-A'amel (Amil)
- 80. Hayy Al-Jihad
- 81. Al-Atiba'a
- 82. Ajnadin, Hayy Al-Shurtta (Shurta) 4th & 5th
- 83. Al-Furat
- 84. Suwaib, Makasib
- 85. Resala, Qertan, Ewainy West
- 86. Ewairij
- 87. Saha (Seha), Hor Rejab
- 88. Mechanic, Asia
- 89. Bo'aitha

== Formation of the current system ==
The City of Baghdad has 89 official neighborhoods within 9 districts. These official subdivisions of the city served as administrative centers for the delivery of municipal services but until 2003 had no political function. Beginning in April 2003, the U.S. controlled Coalition Provisional Authority (CPA) began the process of creating new functions for these subdivisions. The process initially focused on the election of neighborhood councils in the official neighborhoods, elected by neighborhood caucuses. The CPA convened a series of meetings in each neighborhood to explain local government, to describe the caucus election process and to encourage participants to spread the word and bring friends, relatives and neighbors to subsequent meetings. Each neighborhood process ultimately ended with a final meeting where candidates for the new neighborhood councils identified themselves and asked their neighbors to vote for them. Once all 88 (later increased to 89) neighborhood councils were in place, each neighborhood council elected representatives from among their members to serve on one of the city's nine district councils. The number of neighborhood representatives on a district council is based upon the neighborhood's population. The next step was to have each of the nine district councils elect representatives from their membership to serve on the 37 member Baghdad City Council. This three-tier system of local government connected the people of Baghdad to the central government through their representatives from the neighborhood, through the district, and up to the city council.

Baghdad Bank

The same process was used to provide representative councils for the other communities in Baghdad Governorate outside of the city itself. There, local councils were elected from 20 neighborhoods (Nahia) and these councils elected representatives from their members to serve on six district councils (Qada). As within the city, the district councils then elected representatives from among their members to serve on the 35 member Baghdad Regional Council.

The final step in the establishment of the system of local government for Baghdad Province was the election of the Baghdad Provincial Council. As before, the representatives to the Provincial Council were elected by their peers from the lower councils in numbers proportional to the population of the districts they represent. The 41 member Provincial Council took office in February 2004 and served until national elections held in January 2005, when a new Provincial Council was elected.

This system of 127 separate councils may seem overly cumbersome but Baghdad Province is home to approximately seven million people. At the lowest level, the neighborhood councils, each council represents an average of 74,000 people.

== See also ==
- Districts of Iraq
