= Government of Baghdad =

Structure of Baghdad's government.

The government of Baghdad is divided into a hierarchy of governments that both aid governance and provide bottom-up representation. The city constitutes a new “capital territory” whose structure differs from other parts of the country.

== Origins and authority ==
Much of the structure predates the 2003 invasion of Iraq, but officials' powers were originally limited to managing the top-down distribution of governmental services.

The Coalition Provisional Authority's Transitional Administrative Law (TAL) – specifically CPA Order 71 – and the Provincial Powers Law have since changed their responsibilities remarkably, creating a degree of federalism that didn't exist during the Saddam Hussein era. The Constitution alone does not determine Baghdad's government because it is vague and contains gaps and does not lay out the structures in detail. Pre-constitution legislation dating back to 1964 and ad hoc measures that have become custom also determine this structure.

== Governorate and Amanat ==
The province's outlying areas are structured the same as other areas in Iraq but are administered by the governorate instead the Amanat. Iraqi law set the boundaries between Amanat and governorate in 1971, but they’ve been adjusted more recently. The governorate and Amanat are linked at several levels, and the Governorate Council still provides funding for many of Baghdad's projects.

The governorate's structure is similar to the City of Baghdad, but the units have different names. A “qa’da” is similar to a kati’, although it may also be compared to a county. A “nahiya” is similar to a hayy. The deputy governor for rural services oversees these outlying areas, which surround the city from Taji in the north to Mahmudiyah in the south.

== Types of governments ==
Baghdad's governments can be divided into three categories with different – although sometimes overlapping – responsibilities: Political subdivisions, political entities and service entities.

- Political subdivisions are the actual geographic boundaries. They often have their own head and are sometimes – but not always – associated with a political entity, a service entity or both.
- Political entities set the priorities and make decisions for their respective areas. Members are either elected directly or appointed by elected officials. They also directly and indirectly appoint many of the leaders of political subdivisions and service entities.
- Service entities provide the technical expertise and the resources necessary to keep the city running. Employees in these departments are the technocrats who keep the city running regardless of who's in power, although the heads of these groups are political appointees.

The cooperation of all governments is usually required for the successful completion of major projects. Political entities must provide the necessary approval, while service entities must execute the proposal. One or both must provide the funding or access to the funding. This can limit the efficacy of any one government official.

=== Revenue generation ===
Political entities may collect revenue and retain revenue only with the Governorate Council's authorization. Kati’ and neighborhood councils may not have surpluses. In practice, local governments collect taxes and fees only on an extremely limited basis. Neighborhood councils in the Rusafa kati’, for example, oversee generators and charge residents for the electricity they provide. The lack of local funding results in an extremely centralized funding mechanism.

== Political subdivisions ==
=== Baghdad Governorate ===
Governorates, commonly called provinces, are the Iraqi equivalent of states. Baghdad is the smallest but most populous of Iraq's 18 governorates.

A governor heads the governorate. Unlike in the United States, the governor is appointed by the Governorate Council. The governor is the equivalent to a deputy minister in terms of rights and career service. His responsibilities include:

- Preparing the governorate's budget.
- Carrying out the governorate council's decision.
- Implementing the federal governorate's policies.
- Overseeing and inspecting public facilities within the Governorate except for the courts, military units, universities, colleges and institutes.
- Establishing universities, colleges and other institutions in cooperation with the federal Ministry of Higher Education and the Governorate Council.
- Appointing certain governorate staff.
- Establishing or removing police stations.
- Exercising direct authority over all local security forces except for the armed forces.

=== Baghdad City ===
The actual City of Baghdad, overseen by a mayor.

=== Kati' (District) ===
A kati', often called a district, is similar to a borough of a metropolis like New York. Baghdad has nine kati': Rusafa, Adhamiyah, Thawra (Sadr City), 7 Nissan, Karadah, Karkh, Kadhimiyah, Mansour, and Al Rashid.

Each kati' is headed by a qa'im makam elected by the kati' council. The qa'im makam's rank is equivalent to a director general in the federal government. However, Baghdad qa’im makams have significantly fewer restrictions than those in qa'das because they are not constrained by CPA Order 71. Their duties include:

- Carrying out the kati’ council's decisions.
- Directly supervising and inspecting local government departments.
- "Maintain[ing] security and order; protect the rights, lives, and properties of the citizens."
- "Preserv[ing] the rights of the State, maintain[ing] its property, and collect[ing] its revenues in accordance with the law."
- Developing a draft of the budget.
- Ordering the establishment of temporary police stations and patrols when required.

=== Hayy ===
A hayy is an administrative territorial entity of the Amanat that is similar to a district in a large city. Many of Baghdad's 94 hays have evolved different boundaries from government and service bodies on the same level. Both American and Iraqi officials tend to work around the boundaries of the neighborhorhood or kati’ councils instead – making hays an often overlooked, although no less official, tier of government.

=== Muhalla ===
Muhallas, the smallest administrative units, are neighborhoods. The name of each muhalla is a three-digit number. The first number indicates its kati’. The last indicates which side of the kati’ the muhalla is in, depending on whether it is even or odd.

== Political entities ==
=== Baghdad Governorate (Province) Council ===
The Governorate Council, more commonly called the Provincial Council, is similar to a state legislature or the London Assembly. It took over administration of the province from the Baghdad City Council, which the CPA created in 2004.

It oversees the entire governorate, not just the City of Baghdad. The council is composed of 57 directly elected representatives in contrast to the 41 members in Iraq's other governorates. The Provincial Powers Law spells out the council's responsibilities, which include:

- Election of the council chairperson and removal when appropriate.
- Issuing local legislation, regulations and instructions to regulate the governorate's administrative and financial affairs.
- Outlining the governorate's general policies in coordination with the appropriate ministries.
- Preparing the council's budget, ratifying the governorate's budget, transferring funds between its chapters and referring the budget to the Federal Ministry of Finance to be unified with the federal budget.
- Monitoring local executive bodies except for courts, the military, colleges and institutions.
- Electing a governor by an absolute majority within the first 30 days of convening. There will be a runoff election if there is no absolute majority.
- Approving the appointment of senior governorate officials.
- Approving local security plans.
- Approving changes to districts and subdistricts.
- Identifying the governorate's priorities.

=== Kati’ (District) Council ===
Kati’ councils are the Iraqi equivalent of a city council. Members are chosen from among neighborhood council representatives. The number of members on each council varies based on population. The members choose a chairperson to head the council.

The councils have next to no money and must ask – not order – the Governorate Council, beladiyas or Amanat to embark on any project that they want.

The councils were once called “district advisory councils” and are still called “DACs” by many soldiers and American officials. However, their powers now extend beyond mere advisory power. The council's responsibilities include:

- Electing the qa’im makam.
- Monitoring the district's work.
- Preparing and ratifying the local budget.
- Approving street designs and names.
- Approving major designs in cooperation with the Governorate Council under the federal government's general plan.
- Monitoring and evaluating education in the kati’.
- Approving security plans submitted by local security agencies.

=== Neighborhood Council ===
Neighborhood councils are the closest elected officials to the people. The councils are similar to representatives of a city ward. The number of members is based on population. They have no spending money. Like kati’ councils, neighborhood councils are often incorrectly called neighborhood advisory councils. These councils primarily handle lower-level administration functions such as initial approval of fuel or food rations and initial verification of residents returning home after fleeing sectarian fighting.

== Service entities ==
=== Amanat ===
The Amanat is Baghdad's public works department or city hall with a concentration in infrastructure. It is responsible for improving Baghdad's infrastructure and overseeing the city's essential services. Money for large-scale, Iraqi-funded projects typically originates at the Amanat. It has no responsibility for electricity, which is overseen by the federal government's Ministry of Electricity.

The Amanat is headed by an “amin” chosen by the Governorate Council.

=== Beladiya ===
Baghdad's 13 beladiyas can be considered the administering arm of the Amanat. They maintain the city's distribution systems and perform other administrative tasks such as governing water, sewage, roads, public lands and zoning. Beladiyas have significantly less money than the Amanat. This typically limits them to maintaining existing infrastructure and performing low-level improvements such as landscaping or street cleaning. Beladiyas must turn to the Amanat or Governorate Council for the creation of any significant new infrastructure. Beladiyas also control any money collected by the kati’ councils.

The deputy amin for beladiyas appoints a deputy mayor to head each beladiya, but most of the remaining employees are workers hired for specific jobs, such as engineers or street cleaners.
