= Umm al-Qura Mosque =

Large mosque in Baghdad, Iraq

- جامع أم القرى
- Umm al-Qura mosque in 2019

- Location of the mosque in Baghdad

Religion
- Affiliation: Sunni Islam
- Ecclesiastical or organizational status: Mosque
- Governing body: Sunni Endowment
- Status: Active

Location
- Location: al-Adel, Baghdad, Baghdad Governorate
- Country: Iraq
- Interactive map of Umm al-Qura Mosque
- Coordinates: 33°20′16″N 44°17′46″E

Architecture
- Type: Mosque architecture
- Style: Modern Iraqi
- Founder: Saddam Hussein
- Groundbreaking: April 28, 1998
- Completed: 2001
- Construction cost: US$7.5 million

Specifications
- Dome: One
- Dome dia. (outer): 7.5 m (25 ft)
- Minaret: 4 + 4
- Minaret height: 43 m (141 ft) each (x4); 37 m (121 ft) each (x4)
- Materials: White limestone; blue mosaic tiles

The Umm al-Qura Mosque (Arabic: جامع أم القرى, lit. 'Mother of All Cities'), also known as the Umm al-Ma'arik Mosque (lit. 'Mother of All Battles'), is a Sunni mosque located in Baghdad, in the Baghdad Governorate of Iraq. It was the city's largest place of worship for Sunnis, but it has also become the location of a Shi'a hawza and a place of refuge for many fleeing the terrorists' depredations in the Anbar Province. It was designed to commemorate former Iraqi President Saddam Hussein's self-proclaimed victory in the Gulf War (1990–1991) and was intended to serve as a personal tribute to Saddam himself. It is located in the Sunni-populated al-Adel area of western Baghdad.

Although never confirmed by the regime or himself during his lifetime, there was speculation that it was intended to have been Saddam's final resting place.

== History ==
Mosque in 2003

The mosque cost US$7.5 million to build, the mosque's cornerstone was laid on Saddam Hussein's 61st birthday on 28 April 1998. It was formally completed on 28 April 2001 in time for the ten-year anniversary of the Gulf War. The mosque was a part of the Faith Campaign which brought back Islamic elements into Iraqi society as the regime was building other mosques at the time also part of the campaign such as al-Rahman Mosque and the Grand Saddam Mosque.

Following the fall of Saddam Hussein in the aftermath of the 2003 US invasion of Iraq, the mosque was taken over by a Sunni group called the Association of Muslim Scholars. It became a recruiting site and propaganda center for the early Iraqi insurgency. The association became a de facto al-Qaeda ally; its leader Harith Suleiman al-Dhari, who operated out of the mosque, is said to have played a key role in mobilizing insurgents during the 2004 fighting in Fallujah, west of Baghdad. In 2004, the mosque saw a gathering of around 200,000 Muslims, both Sunni and Shi'a Muslims, to denounce the US-led occupation and pledge solidarity with the people of Fallujah as well as the uprising led by the Shi'a cleric, Muqtada al-Sadr. Dr. Harith al-Dhari, the preacher of the Mosque at the time, gave a speech denouncing the US-led occupation and democracy. Reportedly, al-Dhari was seen crying due to what was happening at Fallujah at that time. After the gathering was over, a boycott of American and British goods was called into action. In January 2006, the mosque was subject to a U.S. raid that was linked to the hunt for kidnapped Jill Carroll, an American journalist working for the Christian Science Monitor.

In 2007, the association was expelled by the Sunni Endowment, a quasi-governmental agency responsible for Sunni mosques in Iraq, which took control of Umm al-Qura. On 28 August 2011, the mosque was attacked by a suicide bomber during Friday prayers, killing at least 28 people and injuring 30 more. An Iraqi member of parliament, Khalid al-Fahdawi, was among the dead. The attack came at the end of Ramadan and its motives was sectarian in nature.

On 28 April 2023, a fire broke out inside the mosque after the burning of three caravans surrounded by weed and plants. The fire department fought the fire.

== Architecture ==
The mosque is built of white limestone with blue mosaic decorations. Many architectural features of the mosque and the surrounding complex allude to Saddam Hussein or to the Gulf War (1990–1991).

Western observers have described the mosque's eight minarets as resembling weapons, but the Iraqi government rejects that interpretation. The mosque has four minarets surrounding the dome, and four more at the outer corners of the complex. The inner minarets are said to resemble Kalashnikov rifle barrels, while those on the perimeter are described as looking like Scud ballistic missiles.

Other features clearly refer to Saddam and his politics. The outer minarets are reportedly each 43 meters (140') high, commemorating the 43 days of "U.S. aggression" in January–February 1991, during the Gulf War. The other four minarets are 37 meters (120') in height, commemorating Saddam's birth in 1937. At the center of the mosque is a pool "shaped like the Arab world." The pool has 28 fountains, which together with the four 37-meter (120') minarets represent Saddam's birth date, 28 April 1937. At the center of the pool there is a 7.5-metre-wide (25 ft) mosaic representation of Saddam's thumbprint, inset with an enlarged image of his signature. A Qur'an written in ink made of Saddam's blood was formerly displayed within the mosque complex. Red, white and black Iraqi flags are painted on the peaks of the inner minarets.

== See also ==
- Islam in Iraq
- List of mosques in Baghdad
