= Mansour district =

District in Baghdad

Al-Mansour المنصور
- District
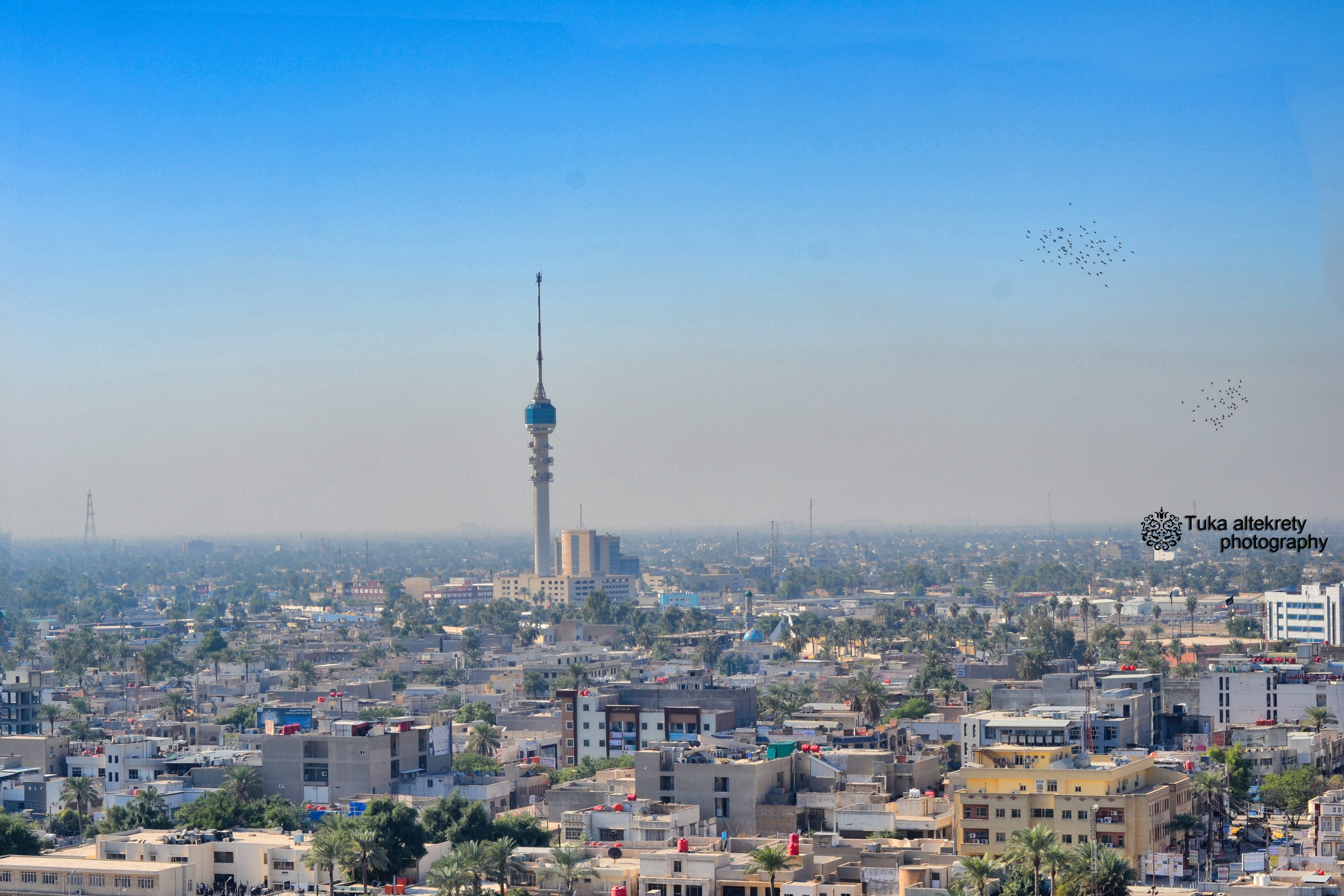
- Baghdad Tower, one of the most iconic landmarks of al-Mansour.
- Interactive map of Al-Mansour
- Country: Iraq
- Governorate: Baghdad
- First settled: 1950s

Population (2018)
  - Total: 451,746
- Time zone: UTC+3

Al-Mansour or just Mansour (Arabic: المنصور) is one of the nine administrative districts in Baghdad, Iraq. It is in western Baghdad and is bounded on the east by al-Karkh district in central Baghdad, to the north by Kadhimiya, to the west by Baghdad International Airport, and to the south by Baghdad Airport Road, on the other side of which is al-Rashid district.

The district is considered a model for the expansion of Baghdad. Beginning in the early 1950s, it became home to many of Baghdad's clubs, housing sites, shopping malls, employment centers, cultural activities, markets, private companies, and restaurants. It's also home to the 14th of Ramadan Street and al-Amirat Street which are important streets in Baghdad. Before 2003, the area was also home to government officials of Saddam Hussein's government and wealthy Sunni families. Thus after the 2003 invasion of Iraq, it became a stronghold for Sunni insurgent groups during the insurgency.

== Historical background ==
=== Establishment and development (1950s-1980s) ===
During the Royal Era of Iraq, al-Mansour Shareholding Company started to develop and plan out designs for the district. The company bought tracts of agricultural lands from their owners at that time and in that location, and he had begun to build the Dragh neighborhood after sorting out the lands belonging to the Dragh family. The neighborhood was distributed to doctors and employees of al-Rafidain Bank. The district in its beginning was characterized by its many markets along with the Princesses Street.

In 1952, an Iraqi social and cultural club named "al-Mansour Club" was established at the direct behest of the Crown Prince Abd al-Ilah and Iraqi Prime Minister Nuri al-Said. This was to spit al-Alawiya Club which was founded by the British. The club contained many activities such as swimming, entertainment, and sports activities. A field for horse racing was also established next to the club and was the pioneer in the region in its time. Apartment complexes were built and distributed to state employees and many state institutions and markets were provided although the challenges rain provided remained a problem until the 1970s. The streets were also connected to the many streets of the city such as al-Rasheed Street and Bab al-Mu'azzam.

Al-Mansour was named after Abu Ja'far al-Mansur, the second Abbasid Caliph and founder of Baghdad. The district became traditionally an affluent area where wealthy Arab families lived. It was also known as the "embassies district" due to the many foreign embassies situated there. It is known to be an avid shopping district that attracts those seeking luxury imported goods, modern marketplaces, and services including restaurants, cafes, and entertainment. Among them was al-Sa'ah Restaurant which was one of the most famous restaurants in al-Mansour during the 1990s and considered an important part of the district before it was demolished in 2022.

Furthermore, the district includes the main airport of Baghdad, the Baghdad International Airport. The Airport was built by French company Spie Batignolles under an agreement made in 1979 although the airport's opening was delayed to 1982 due to the Iran-Iraq War.

=== Present day (1990s-present) ===
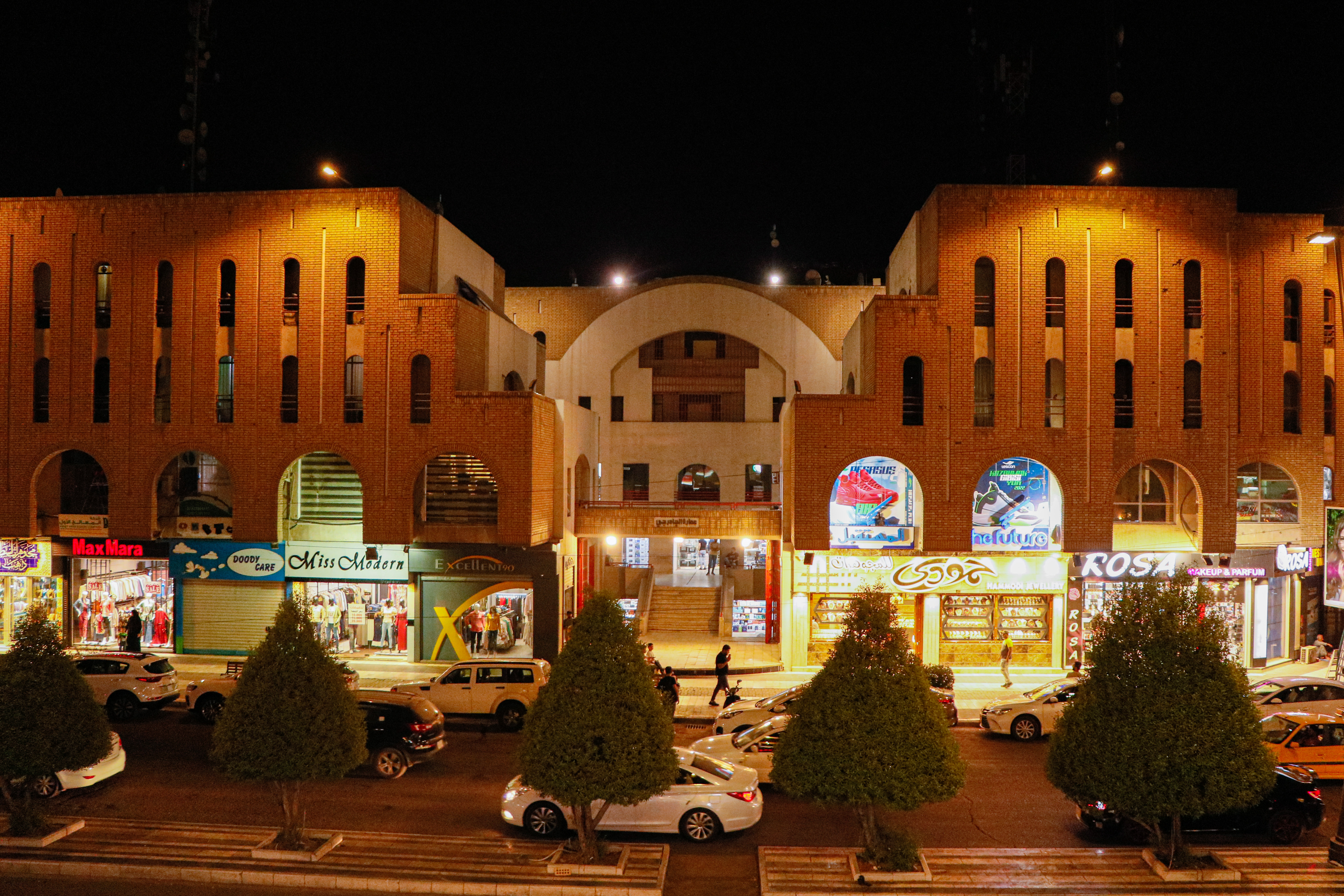
The Chadirji Building in al-Mansour in 2020.

In 1994, former-Iraqi President Saddam Hussein ordered the building of al-Ma'mun Tower, then called the Saddam Tower, which was Iraq's first revolving restaurant. It was topped with observation balconies, a café level, and two restaurants.

On December 12, 1996, Uday Saddam Hussein was subjected to an assassination attempt while he was driving his golden Porsche in al-Mansour neighborhood. Two unidentified gunmen, with their Kalashnikov rifles, opened fire and wounded Uday with 16 bullets. Uday visited the district's boulevards on a regular basis but the assassination attempt raised questions on how the gunmen managed to track down Uday.

During the reign of Saddam Hussein, the horse racing field was moved to its current location in al-Ghazaliya in 1993. This was during the Faith Campaign and the movement of the field was to make way for the construction of a new Mosque. Architect Saher al-Qaisi was brought to prepare the designs and planning of what would become one of the largest mosques in the Islamic world that would rival the Taj Mahal in India. After the first phase of the project was completed, architect Afif Jawad was brought to design the new design for the mosque. After the plans were submitted that included details, measurements, and locations, in addition to the facades and their detailed treatment, in addition to the general site that includes private and public corridors, the minaret, the summer chapel, entrances, and service buildings; construction on what would become al-Rahman Mosque began in 1999. Although the construction of the Mosque stopped after the US-led invasion on Iraq took place in 2003.

In 2004, the Umm al-Qura Mosque, a Sunni Mosque built by Saddam Hussein, saw a gathering of 200,000 Muslims, both Sunni and Shi'a Muslims, to denounce the US-led occupation and pledge solidarity with the people of Fallujah as well as the uprising led by the Shi'a cleric, Muqtada al-Sadr. The preacher of the Mosque, Dr. Harith al-Dhari, gave a speech denouncing the US-led occupation and democracy. Reportedly. al-Dhari was crying due to what was happening at Fallujah at that time. After the gathering was over, a boycott of American and British goods was called into action. Protests were also carried out against the US-led occupation.

During the sectarian unrest which occurred between 2006 and 2007, the district became a place of extreme contention and violence, resulting in street violence and bombings which displaced much of the population at the time resulting in extensive damage and depopulation of citizens due to the Sunni majority at the time leaving the district. Kidnappings along with robberies also became widespread in the district. Militias, including Iranian-backed ones, moved into the district and some captured al-Rahman Mosque to use it as headquarters. Gradually, as the situation in Baghdad stabilized, markets, shopping malls, and luxury goods returned to the area.

Malls, such as the Babylon Mall, have also been opened in the district in order to expand commercial plans in the district.

== Al-A'mariya shelter bombing ==
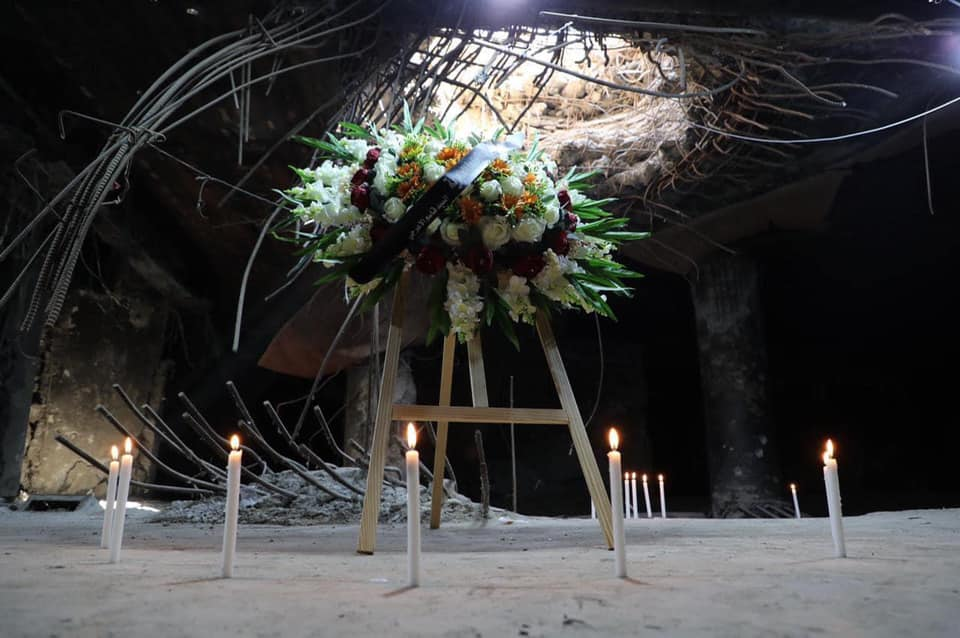
Candles lit near the bomb's entry hole in February 2021.

In al-A'mariya, an area located in al-Mansour, an air-raid shelter ("Public Shelter No. 25") was built named "al-A'mariya shelter" and was used in both the Iran-Iraq War and the Persian Gulf War by hundreds of civilians. On February 13, 1991, during the Persian Gulf War, at 4:00 am, two Allied bombers flew over Baghdad and targeted the shelter, which was filled with residents from the area who had sought its safety. The first plane bombed the shelter and opened a hole through it. Six minutes later the second plane dropped a conventional bomb through the opening. The explosion, created by GBU-27 Paveway III laser-guided "smart bombs", resulted in the killing of at least 408 civilians with only 14 survivors. Some of the victims of the explosion died immediately while some burnt to death.

The U.S. Department of Defense stated that they "knew the [Amiriyah] facility had been used as a civil-defense shelter during the Iran–Iraq War", while the U.S. military stated they believed the shelter was no longer a civil defense shelter and that they thought it had been converted to a command center or a military personnel bunker. Nevertheless, the Human Rights Watch stated that "The United States' failure to give such a warning before proceeding with the disastrous attack on the [Amiriyah] shelter was a serious violation of the laws of war" and the event was characterized as a war crime. In 2002, doctor and artist Ala'a Bashir, one of the people who were at the shelter an hour after it was bombed, designed and erected a monument dedicated to the memory of the victims based on his memory of the event. The statue, being about nine meters and three meters in width, contains a screaming human head set between solid stone blocks surrounding it, with the head being stretched out by shadows. After the US invasion of Iraq, the Iraqi government tried removing the monument but families of the victims managed to build a wall around the monument to protect it. As of 2020, the monument still exists. Today, the site is a memorial dedicated to the victims with a museum.

== Sites of Interest ==
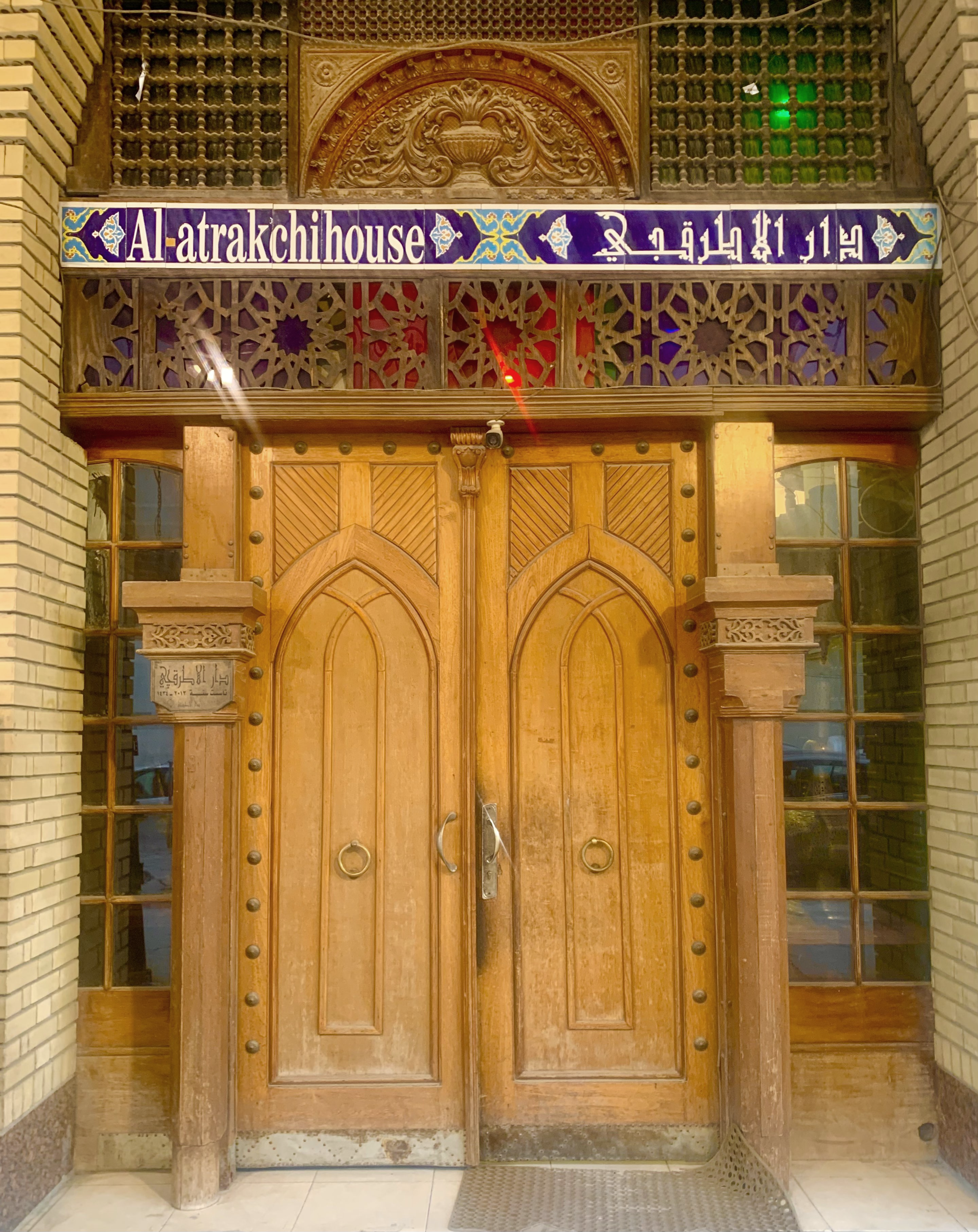
The Mansour location for the Dar al-Atraqchi Café.

Al-Mansour is home to many notable activities and significant landmarks.

=== Al-Mansur Statue ===
Statue of Caliph Abu Ja'far al-Mansur, founder of Baghdad, by sculptor, Khaled al-Rahal.

A bronze bust of Abu Ja'far al-Mansur was erected in the Mansour district in 1979 and was designed to serve as a link between Iraq's illustrious past and its bright future. The work of Iraqi sculptor, Khaled al-Rahal, the statue base was bombed by unidentified armed men on October 18, 2005, the day former president Saddam Hussein was put on trial. The base was later rebuilt, and the statue was reattached in May 2008.

The Statue is a bronze sculpture of the face of the Abbasid Caliph, mounted on a brick body that forms a small building decorated with Islamic decoration. The statue and its complex is located on a small rounded square decorated with trees and herbs.

The statue also gained infamy due to Shi'i extremists calling for the removal and demolishing of the statue and used Social Medias such as Twitter in order to spread the message. This forced the government to take a security measure and deploy law enforcement forces in order to protect the statue from vandalism.

=== Al-Ma'mun Tower ===
Al-Ma'mun Tower (Arabic: برج المأمون), also known as the Baghdad Tower (Arabic: برج بغداد), is located in the Yarmouk Neighborhood and it was built as a communication center as well as a revolving restaurant on top of it in 1991. The tower was damaged during the US invasion of Iraq in 2003 but it had been renovated a few times. It was formerly called as International Saddam Tower. The name was changed after the 2003 invasion of Iraq and adopted its current name.

=== Places of worship ===
- Al-Rahman Mosque (Arabic: جامع الرحمان) is the biggest mosque in Iraq although construction on the mosque has stopped since 2003. The mosque contains very large domes, a number of which are eight domes, in the middle of which is a very huge one, and it was hoped that after the completion of construction, it would be one of the largest mosques in the world. Al-Rahman Mosque was supposed to rival the Taj Mahal of India and represented a hypothetical philosophical idea based on the establishment of a living edifice that has the ability to generate sustainable positive energies that represent the Islamic faith and monotheism. Since 2003, construction on the Mosque stopped and the Shi'a Endowment Council took over the mosque and opposed the construction of the Mosque due to its costs of 200 million dollars. The fate of the Mosque remains unknown.
- Hajja Saadia al-Omari Mosque (Arabic: جامع الحاجة سعدية العمري) is a Sunni Mosque located on 14 Ramadan Street in the Mansour neighborhood. The Mosque was built in 1976 by a Hajjah whom the Mosque is named after. It can hold up to 700 worshippers during Friday prayers and includes a library, minaret, and an oval dome decorated with green bricks. Among the activities of the Mosque are holding courses for memorizing the Qur'an during the summer school holidays as well as providing material and relief assistance to the poor and needy families, as well as the families of martyrs and detainees. The Mosque also witnessed challenges during the Sectarianist unrest in the 2000s.
- Umm al-Tabul Mosque (Arabic: جامع أم الطبول) is the most famous and largest among the mosques in Baghdad inspired by Cairo Citadel in Cairo. It is located at the entrance to the main road leading to Baghdad International Airport. Its area is about 15,000 square meters and accommodates about 1,500 worshipers. Its construction was completed in 1968 and was named after the neighborhood it was built on with the same name. The mosque contains calligraphy made by the Iraqi calligrapher Hashem Muhammad al-Baghdadi.
- Al-Qubanchi Mosque (Arabic: جامع القبانچي) is a mosque located in al-Harithiya area on the Damascus Street which connects to al-Karkh. The mosque was built by Iraqi artist Muhammad al-Qubanchi. Al-Qubanchi originally wanted to build a house on the land which he bought and even commissioned architects to design the house. But after a dream he had in his sleep, he decided to scrap the idea for a house and instead built a mosque in 1977 which became al-Qubanchi Mosque. He worked in the mosque and requested to be buried in the mosque, and he was so after his death in 1989. Poet Walid al-Azzami helped to write the calligraphy on the mosque.
- Umm al-Qura Mosque (Arabic: جامع أم القرى) is the largest Sunni Mosque located in al-Ghazaliya and was built during the reign of Saddam Hussein. Work began on the Mosque on April 28, 1998, and the mosque was finished on April 28, 2001 and includes architecture that was common at the time of Saddam Hussein's rule and a large dome. The Mosque is opened for both Sunni and Shi'i Muslims. During Ramadan of 2011, 28 worshippers were killed in a suicide bombing.
Pictures of mosques in al-Mansour

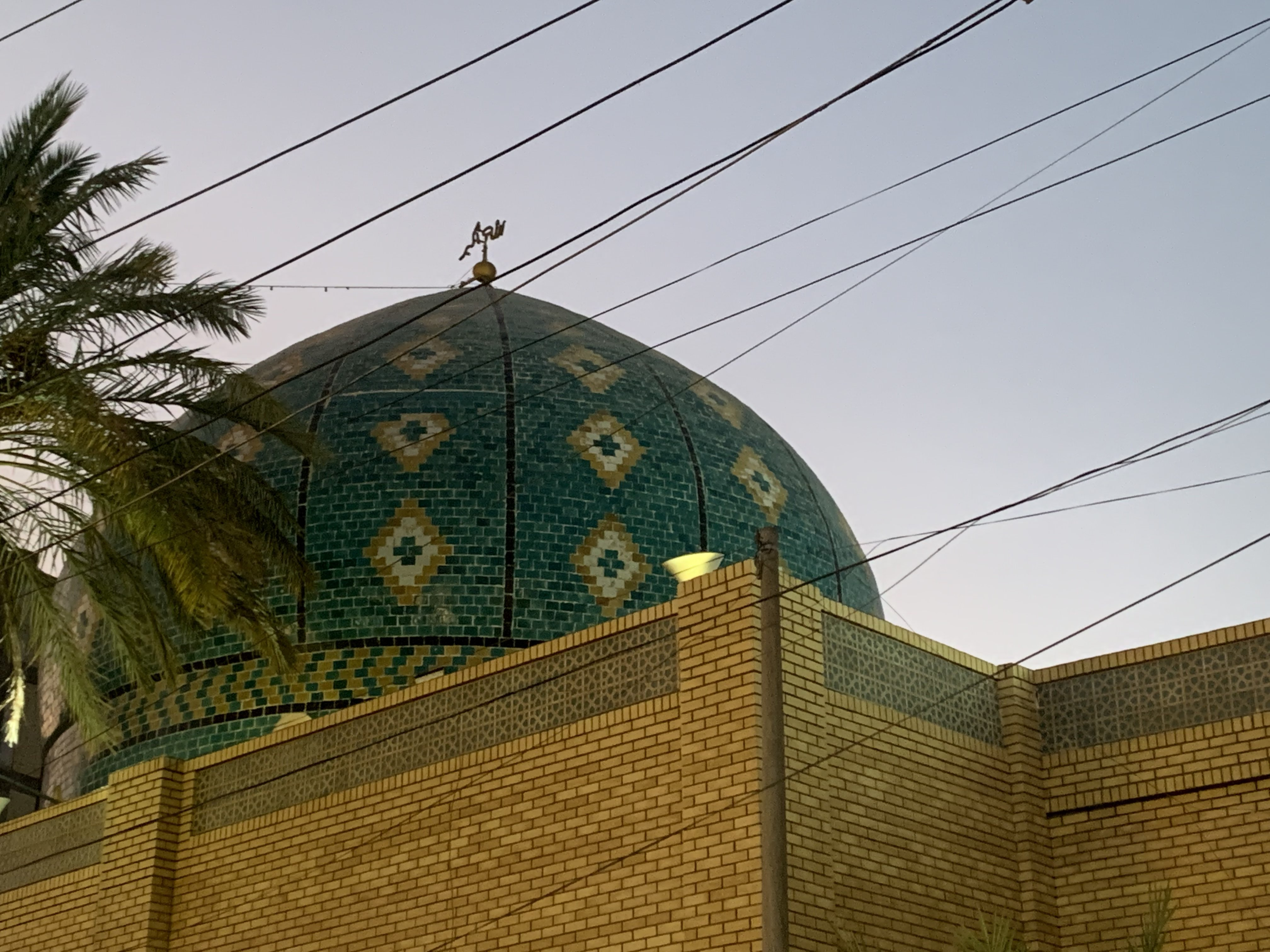
Dome of Saadia al-Omari Mosque

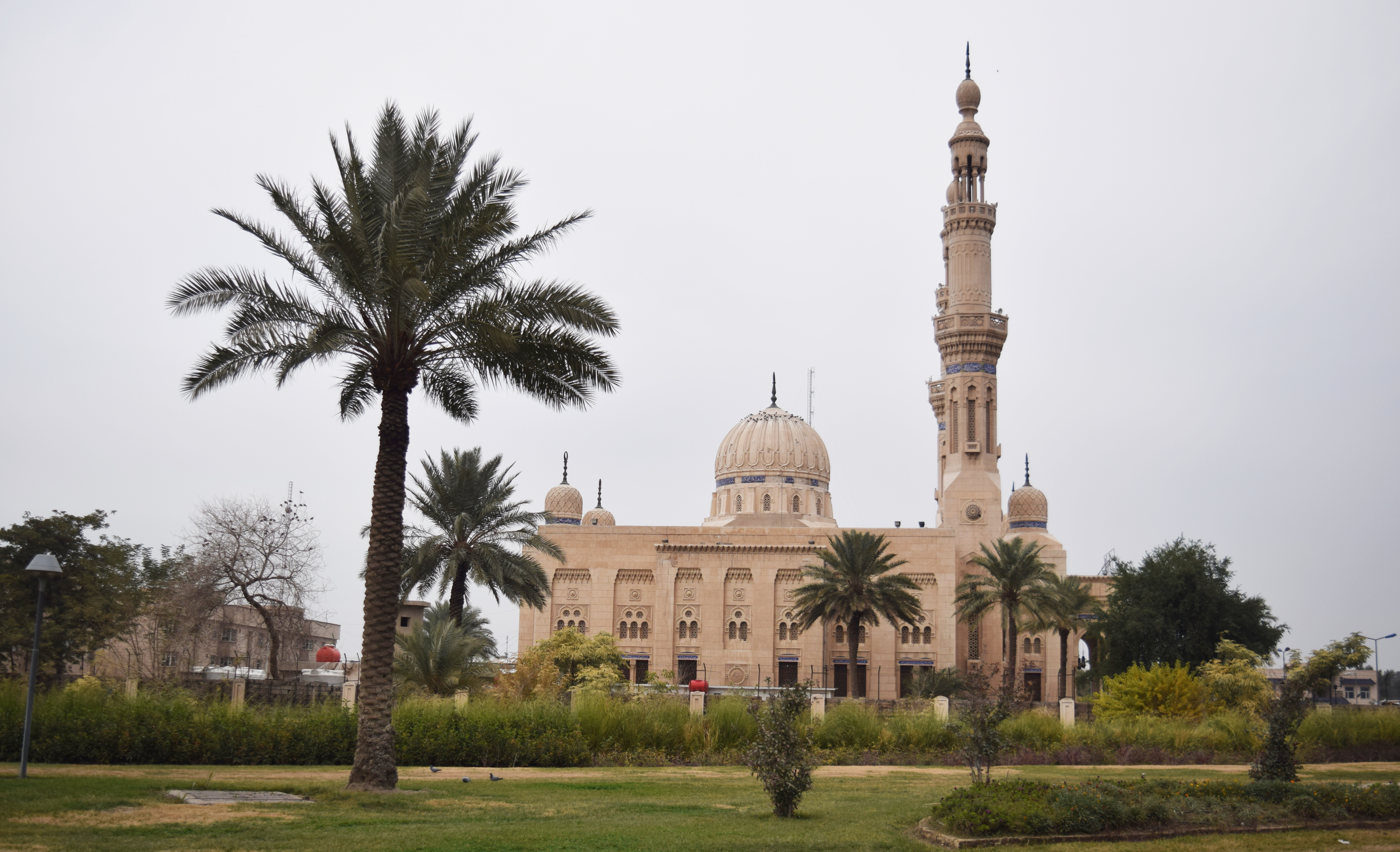
Umm al-Tabul Mosque

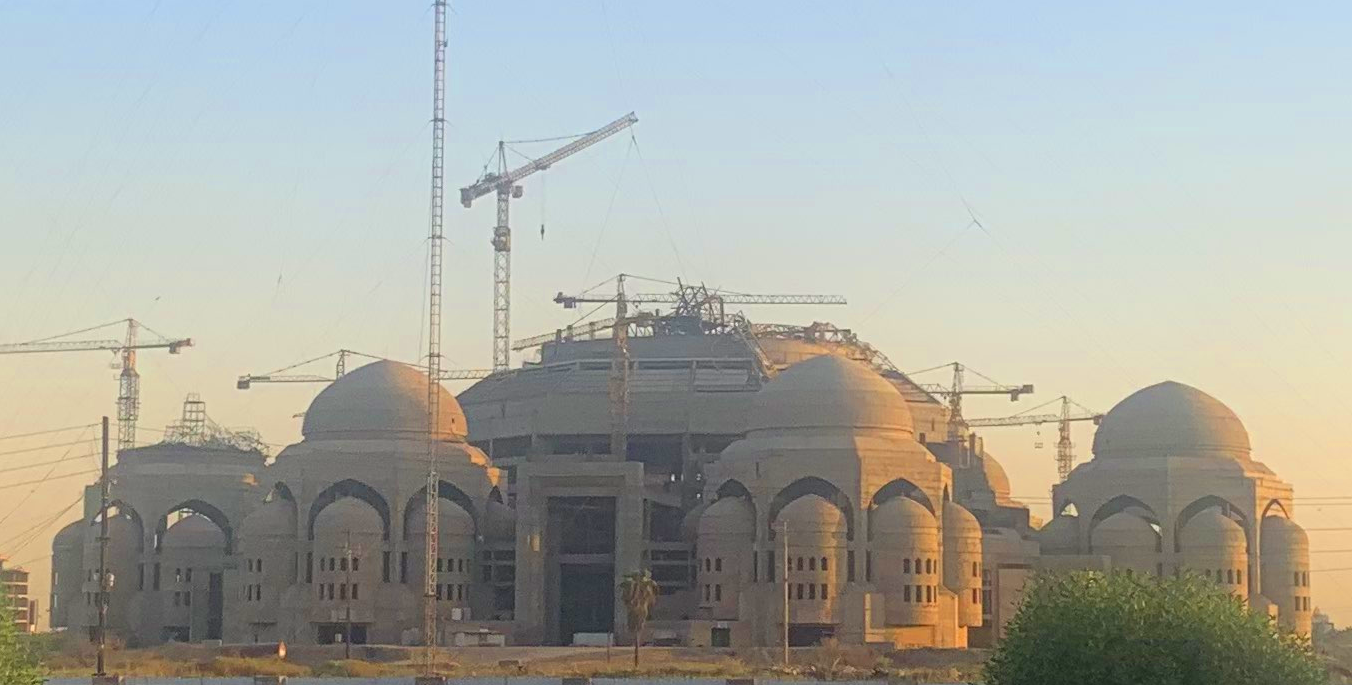
Al-Rahman Mosque

Umm al-Qura Mosque

=== Shopping malls ===
- Al-Mansour Mall (Arabic: مول المنصور) is one of the largest commercial malls in Baghdad, built to reduce unemployment in the area and attract foreign capital. Opened in 2013, the mall has four floors including within them are over 170 shops and a sophisticated cinema.
- Babylon Mall (Arabic: بابيلون مول) is a commercial and investment mall opened by the Baghdad Investment Commission and the Baghdad Municipality and was built on land owned by the Municipality. The mall's goal is to expand the field of commercial and marketing services and shops as part of a plan to increase investment projects and activate the private sector as well as reduce unemployment. The mall has multiple floors. Including the basement, a floor with a bazaar, the first floor which includes commercial stores, the second floor which includes shops and restaurants, the third floor which includes a coffee shop, the fourth floor which contains games and restaurants, the fifth floor which contains more restaurants and shops and a sixth floor.

== Neighborhoods ==
- 62. Qadissiya
- 63. Mansour neighbourhood, Dragh, Baghdad International Fair
- 64. Al-Washash
- 65. Iskan
- 66. 14 Ramadan
- 67. Yarmouk
- 68. Safarat complex, Kafa'at
- 69. Al-A'amiriya
- 70. Al Khadhraa, Hayy Al-Jami'a
- 71. Al-Adel
- 72. Al-Ghazaliya East
- 73. Al-Ghazaliya West
- 74. Baghdad Airport-Abu Ghrib road

== Notable people ==
- Noor Alsaffar

== See also ==
- List of places in Iraq
- List of neighborhoods and districts in Baghdad
- Mansour neighbourhood
