= Al-Jadriya =

District in Baghdad

Al-Jadriya الجادرية
- Neighborhood
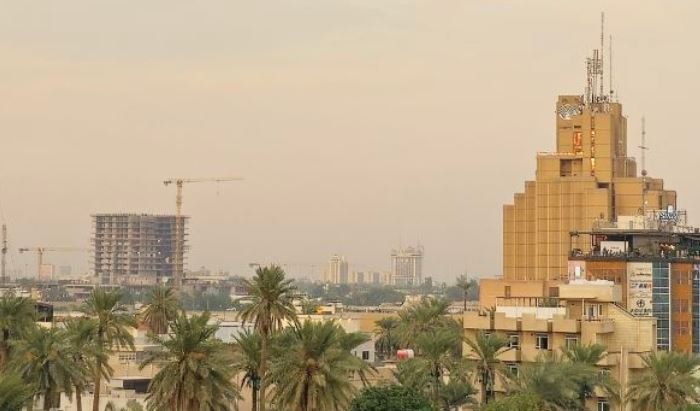
- Central Bank of Iraq Tower in Al-Jadriya
- Interactive map of Al-Jadriya
- Location in Baghdad, Iraq Al-Jadriya (Iraq)
- Coordinates: 33.2833°N 44.3667°E
- Country: Iraq
- Governorate: Baghdad Governorate
- City: Baghdad
- District: Karrada
- Elevation: 34 m (112 ft)
- Time zone: UTC+3 (Arabian Standard Time)
- Area code: +964

Al-Jadriya is a neighborhood in Baghdad, Iraq. It is situated along the Tigris River and shares a significant but comparatively smaller part of the peninsula with the neighboring Karrada district. Located at the southern tip of the peninsula, Al-Jadriya lies where the Tigris river makes a major turn heading northeast.

== Significance ==
Al-Jadriya is recognized for its high quality of life, making it one of the more affluent neighborhoods in Baghdad. The area is home to several notable landmarks and institutions, including the Central Bank of Iraq Tower and University of Baghdad, both of which contribute to its cultural, educational, and economic importance within the city.

== Notable Landmarks ==
- Central Bank of Iraq Tower (under construction)
- University of Baghdad

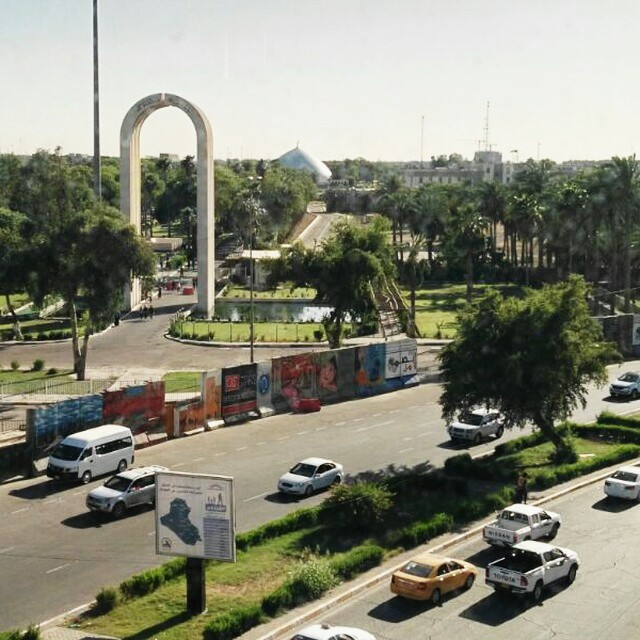
University of Baghdad in Al-Jadriya

== See also ==
- Baghdad
- Karrada
- Administrative districts in Baghdad
- Neighborhoods in Baghdad
