= Ghazaliya =

Neighborhood of Baghdad

Ghazaliya الغزالية
- Neighborhood
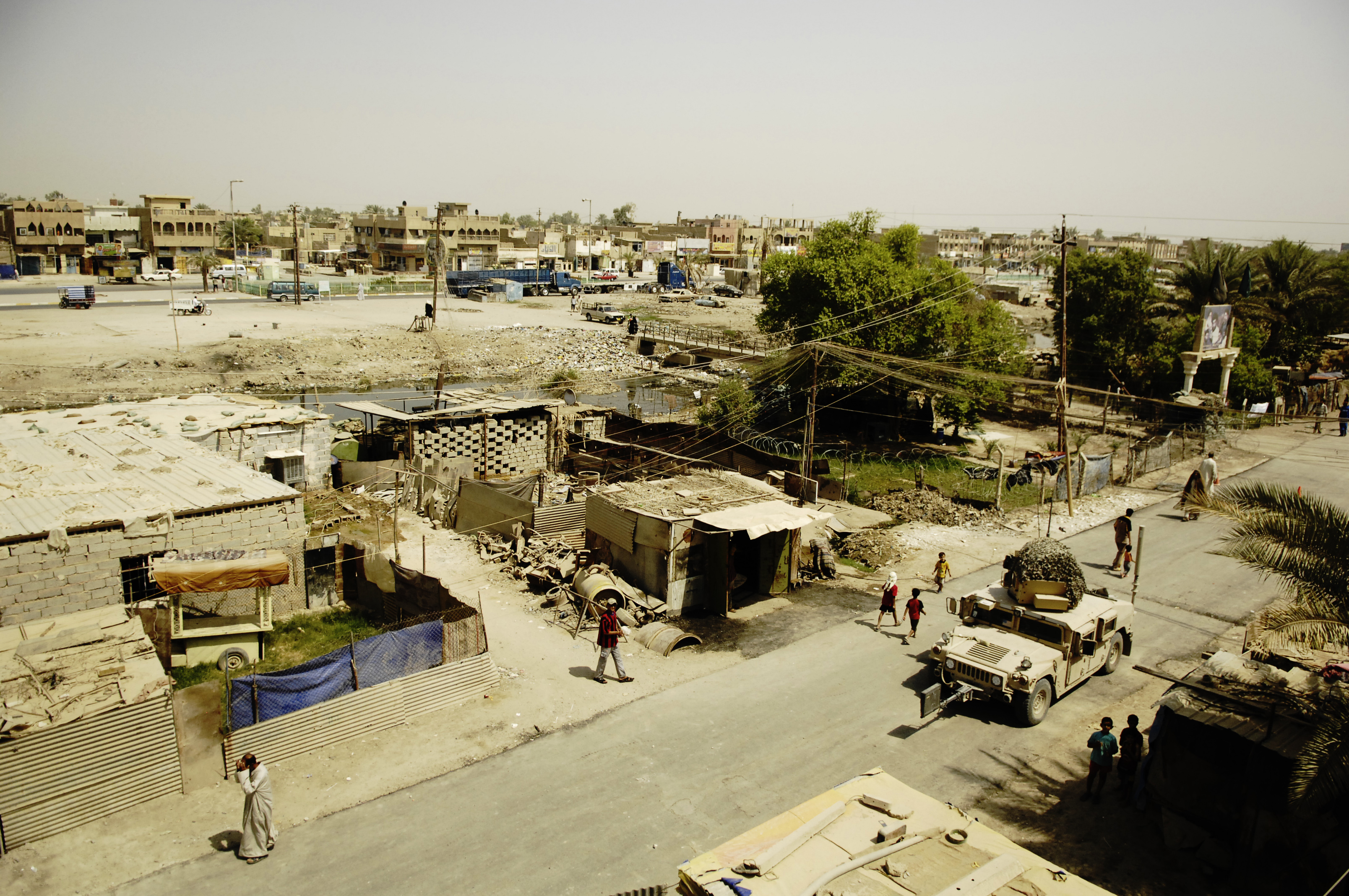
- Umm al-Maarik Mosque, 2003
- Interactive map of Ghazaliya
- Location in Baghdad
- Coordinates: 33°20′43″N 44°16′50″E
- Country: Iraq
- Governorate: Baghdad Governorate
- District: Mansour district
- Established: 1980s

Population
  - Total: ~100,000
- Time zone: UTC+3 (Arabian Standard Time)

Ghazaliya (Arabic: الغزالية) is a neighborhood in the western outskirts of Baghdad, Iraq, in the city's Mansour district. To the north of Ghazaliya is the neighborhood of Al-Shu'ala, to the east is Al-Adel, to the south is Al Khadhraa, and to the west is Abu Ghraib. It is a working-class neighborhood of about 100,000 residents. Ghazaliya is situated around six major streets that all end at farms that formerly belonged to Uday Hussein, the son of Saddam Hussein.

== Etymology ==
There are two theories regarding the origin of the name Ghazaliya.

The first theory suggest that the district got its name because the area used to be inhabited by gazelles (Arabic: غزال; or “ghazal”), and thus the place came to be known as “الغزالية”; that is, “Ghazaliya” or “the abode of the gazelles”.

The second theory suggests the district is located at an area that used to be partially owned by a woman named غزالة (Ghazala). She and her sister Junyina were the owners of the land that is district Ghazaliya today. Junyina owned the other half of the land, and until the 1990's the name of the district was “Ghazaliya and Junyina”. Eventually the name Ghazaliya came to be used to refer to both lands which comprise the district today.

== History ==
Ghazaliya was built in the Mid-1980s and was home for many military officers during Saddam Hussein's rule. It was a middle to high class area of mainly Sunni Muslims with some Shia, Christians and others. Saddam hid here during the first Gulf War. That place where Saddam had hidden was turned into the largest mosque in Baghdad which was named Um Al-Maarik mosque. After the U.S. invasion of Iraq in 2003 the Shia named it Um Al-Baneen for about 7 months then the Sunnis took back the control of the mosque and named it جامع أم القرى Umm al-Qura Mosque.

When Sunni–Shia conflict flared in Iraq following the February 2006 al-Askari Mosque bombing in Samarra, Shia militias pushed into Ghazaliya from neighboring Al-Shu'ala. Sunnis turned to Al-Qaeda in Iraq and Shia families fled. Ghazaliya's mixed community split into a Sunni southern section and a Shia northern section. The US Army built concrete walls to segregate the two communities and to create a secure perimeter.
