= Faith Campaign =

Islamist campaign of the Iraqi Ba'ath party

The Takbir was added to Iraq's flag during the Gulf War, in part to bolster the Iraqi government's Islamist credentials.

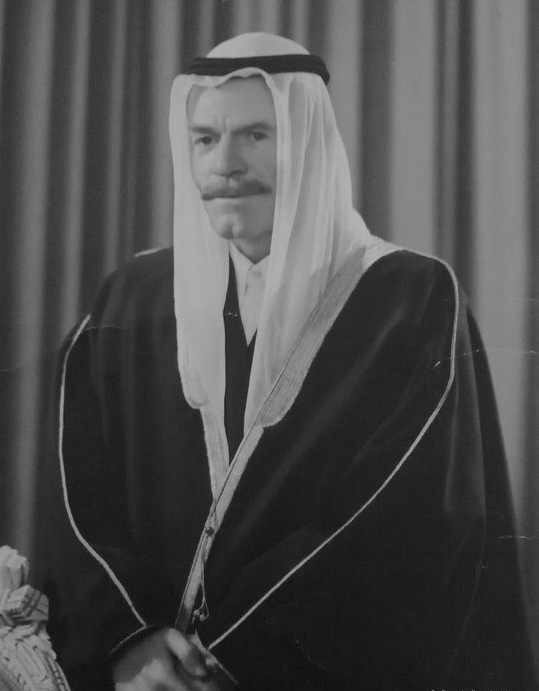
Izzat al-Douri, supervisor of the Faith Campaign

The Faith Campaign (Arabic: الحملة الايمانية, romanized: al-Ḥamla al-Īmāniyya) was an Islamist campaign conducted by the Iraqi Ba'ath Party, beginning in 1993. The campaign involved a variety of policies, including greater freedoms being granted to Islamist groups, greater resources being put into religious programmes, increased use of Islamic punishments, and a greater emphasis being put on Islam in all sectors of Iraqi life.

The campaign was conducted under the supervision of Izzat Ibrahim al-Douri, who would later become Saddam Hussein's successor as leader of the Ba'ath party. Douri used the campaign to promote his Naqshbandi Sufi order, which would later form the nucleus of the Army of the Men of the Naqshbandi Order.

== Prelude ==
Whilst the Ba'athist leadership traditionally viewed Islamists as backwards, treating them with suspicion, towards the end of the 1980s the Iraqi government began to make overtures towards the Muslim Brotherhood, as well as other Sunni and Shiite Islamist groups. Other initial signs of this turn to Islamism were Saddam's claim that Ba'ath party founder Michel Aflaq had converted to Islam on his deathbed, and also the addition of the takbir to the Iraqi flag in 1991.

One interpretation states that such a repudiation of Ba'athism's traditionally secularist stance was driven possibly not by a genuine shift in Saddam Hussein's political convictions, but rather a politically calculated move in order to reduce the risk of an Islamist uprising against the Baathist State. Dr Samuel Helfont, a scholar at the University of Pennsylvania, says that while "the Faith Campaign is normally portrayed in ideological terms—as the regime shifting away from secular nationalism toward a more religious outlook" in fact, "Iraq's internal archives show that the campaign had much more to do with the regime's institutional capacity to incorporate its views on religion into its policies without empowering hostile elements of the Iraqi religious landscape." Helfont concludes, "thus the Faith Campaign should really not be seen as an ideological shift toward Islamism, as many have seen it. It was, in fact, an attempt by the regime to fight the rising tide of Islamism in the region", though he noted that Iraqi society over the course of the 1990s became more religiously radicalized regardless of the regime's actions.

== Campaign ==
The campaign was formally announced by Saddam in mid-June 1993, with the initial stages focusing on the closing of much of Baghdad's nightlife. Saddam banned the sale of alcohol in public places, public consumption became punishable with imprisonment. The study of the Qu'ran became a core subject in the national educational curriculum, and a greater emphasis was put on the more general studying of Islam, with around 30,000 Qur'an and Islam teachers recruited benefiting from a monthly allowance outside their regular salary.

The campaign was intended to combat Shia influence in Iraq as well as to satisfy the Sunni population at a time when Iraq was dealing with worsening sanctions that increased opposition to the government. Most of Iraqi Kurdistan was outside of government control and was thus unaffected by the campaign and its consequences. However, during the campaign, some Iraqi Kurds started to express their Kurdishness as an integral part of Sunni Muslim identity. Several factions such as the Kurdistan Islamic Movement, Islamic Group, and the Kurdistan Islamic Union emerged and became part of the traditionally nationalist Kurdish politics, although incorporating Islam. These Islamic groups, supported by regional networks, also sponsored new mosques, radio and television stations, hospitals, and Islamic clothing stores.

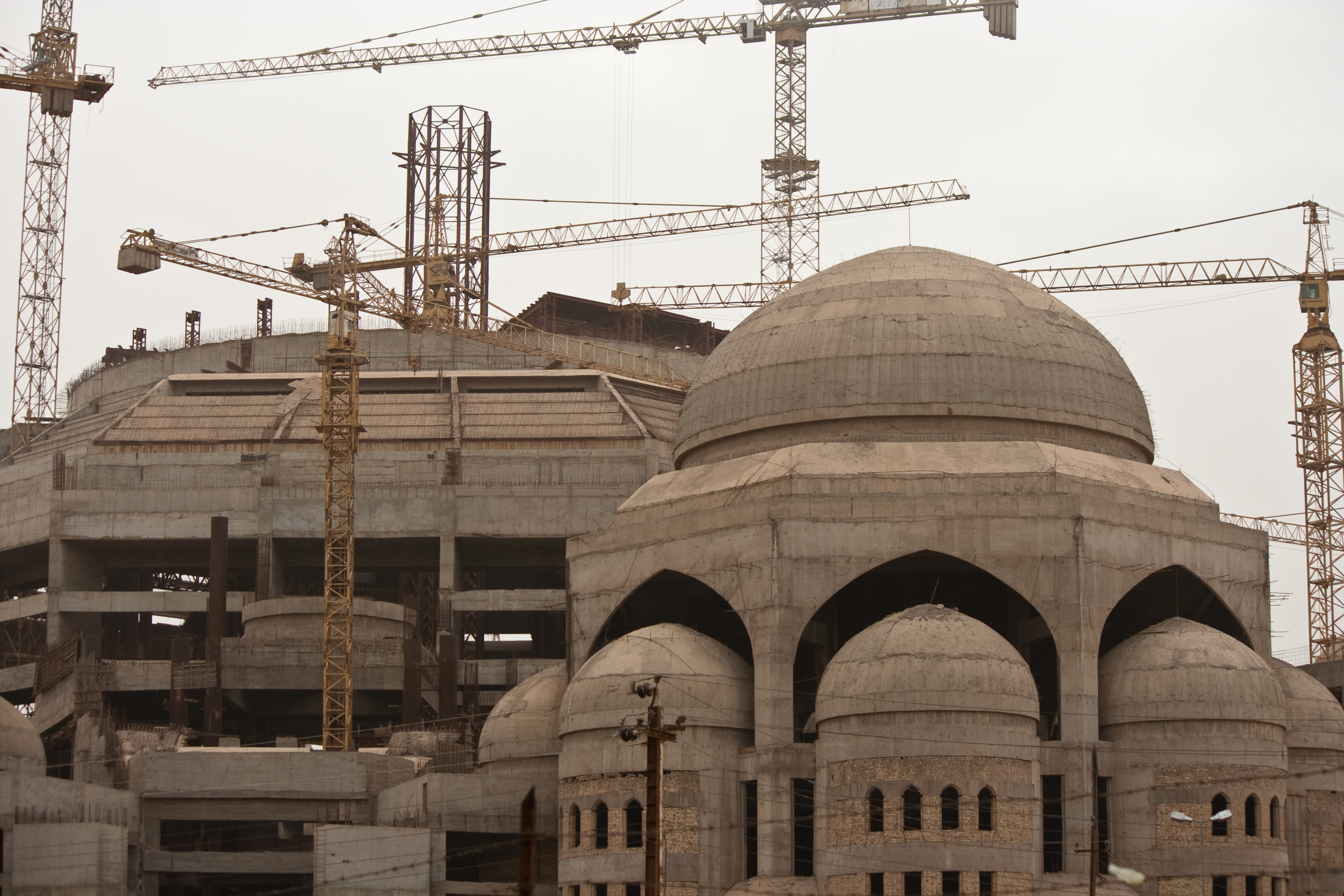
The unfinished Al-Rahman Mosque

Along with these efforts the government, already financially stretched due to sanctions, refocused resources on the construction and maintenance of mosques, for instance, Baghdad's Umm al-Qura Mosque, and the expansive and unfinished Al-Rahman mosque.

The government also made use of stricter punishments for crimes, most notably in the increased usage of amputation as a punishment, which was used for crimes such as desertion and certain forms of corruption and thievery. In the last two years of Saddam's rule, a campaign of beheadings was carried out by Saddam's presidential paramilitary force, the Fedayeen Saddam, which targeted women accused of prostitution, as John F. Burnes reported to The New York Times in January 2003. According to contemporary reports by human rights groups, the paramilitary force killed more than 200 people.

== Internal dissent ==
The campaign did not have complete support from the Ba'athist leadership, and Saddam Hussein is sometimes cited as the only major Ba'athist leader to have supported it. In contrast the former Prime Minister Sa'dun Hammadi, and former Intelligence Director Barzan Ibrahim al-Tikriti, were noted opponents of the campaign. Barzan in particular was fearful that the Islamist groups Saddam wished to placate would eventually seek to replace him and establish themselves in his place, and argued that in the meantime any alliance with Salafists would alienate both Iraqi Shiites and also other Arab states in the region.

One of the few noted public opponents of the plan was Saddam's son Uday Hussein. His Babil newspaper criticized the program, arguing that the campaign would undermine Iraq's religiously pluralistic society, and encourage sectarian division, thereby undermining Iraq. The paper argued that Saddam's attempt to gain the support of Islamic fundamentalists was ultimately doomed to fail, as such groups would accept nothing less than strict Islamic law. The paper also published letters critical of the government and security services' tolerance for Iraq's growing Salafist movements. At another point, Babil however joined in railing against the Shi'ites, even referring to them as rafidah (rejectors), a hateful epithet normally used by ultraconservative Salafis only.

== Consequences ==
By the late 1990s, the growth of Salafism in Iraq had seen not just regime allies benefit, but also groups opposed to the Ba'athist government. This manifested itself in the late 90s in the form of a low level terrorist campaign, including the kind of car bombings and assassinations that would later characterize the Iraqi insurgency.

Part of the campaign had included attempting to infiltrate many mosques and Islamic organisations with security officials, however, many of these individuals themselves became persuaded by Salafist teachings of the groups they had initially been sent to infiltrate.

Following the fall of the Ba'athist government as a result of the 2003 invasion of Iraq, many former members of the security agencies, now imbibed with a more Ba'athist-Salafist ideology, went on to form various insurgent groups which would place a key role in the post-invasion insurgency, with people like Abdullah al-Janabi being key examples of former security officials turned Salafist insurgents. Ultimately a significant number of these individuals would later go on to join the Islamic State of Iraq and the Levant.
