= Al-Rahman Mosque, Baghdad =

Incomplete mosque in Baghdad, Iraq

Al-Rahman Mosque
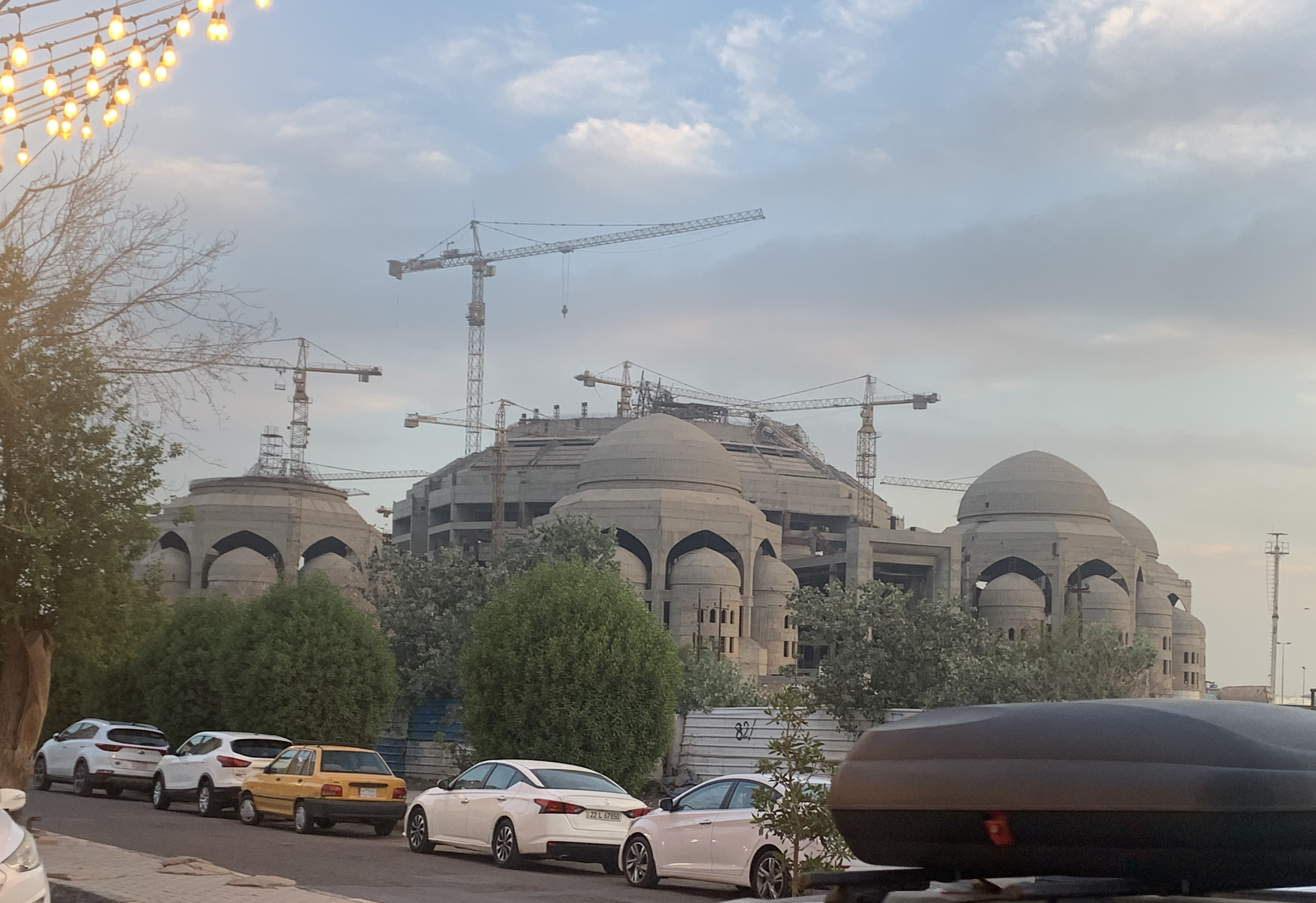
- The incomplete mosque in 2023

- Location of the incomplete mosque in Baghdad

Religion
- Affiliation: Islam (when complete)
- Rite: Disputed between Shia and Sunni
- Ecclesiastical or organisational status: Mosque (when complete)
- Status: Incomplete (since 2003)

Location
- Location: Mansour neighbourhood, Baghdad, Baghdad Governorate
- Country: Iraq
- Interactive map of Al-Rahman Mosque
- Coordinates: 33°18′44″N 44°21′6″E

Architecture
- Architects: Saher al-Qaisi; Afif Jawad
- Type: Mosque architecture
- Style: Modern Iraqi
- Founder: Saddam Hussein
- Completed: Incomplete

Specifications
- Capacity: 15,000 worshippers
- Dome: Nine
- Dome height (outer): 250 m (820 ft)
- Site area: 4.5 ha (11 acres)

The Al-Rahman Mosque (Arabic: جامع الرحمن, lit. 'Mosque of The Most Merciful') in Baghdad, was intended to be one of the largest mosques in Iraq. It was begun by Saddam Hussein in 1998, but work was cut short during the US-led invasion of Iraq in 2003 and it was never completed and only its skeleton remains.

After the United States' occupation of Iraq, Shi'ite militias took control of Al-Rahman Mosque and used the surrounding lands as a parking lot. The mosque remains incomplete in Baghdad's Mansour neighbourhood, in the place of the old race track. Its main, incomplete dome, is surrounded by eight smaller, independent domes, which in turn feature eight even smaller domes integrated into their walls. The main dome is approximately 250 metres (820 ft) in diameter, and the mosque occupies 4.5 hectares (11 acres).

== History ==
=== Background ===
By the 1990s, Iraq had started to improve its Islamic credentials which included the building of mosques. This was a part of the Faith campaign which included implementing Sharia sciences in the joints and stages of Iraqi education. To complete this campaign, former Iraqi President Saddam Hussein decided to build large mosques for the state in every Iraqi province including Baghdad where Saddam built many mosques.

Architect Saher al-Qaisi was assigned to prepare the design and implementation plans for a new large mosque project through a contract between the Presidency of the Diwan and the University of Baghdad, provided that the work takes place from al-Idrisi Center of the Ministry of Housing and Construction. After the completion of the first phase of the project, the person in charge of the follow-up was changed from Laith al-Nuaimi, the owner of the winning design idea, to be replaced by the architect Afif Jawad who was asked to make a new design for the mosque for the second phase. The new design included private and public corridors, the main minaret, the summer chapel, entrances, and service buildings as well as façades, measurements, and locations. The main mosque would be surrounded by eight smaller mosques with domes. The main mosque would've included a central dome that had faience decorated with gold.

The mosque's location was decided to be built in al-Mansour district and it was built on the location of the old horse racing field which was moved to al-Ghazaliya in 1993.

=== Construction and abandonment ===
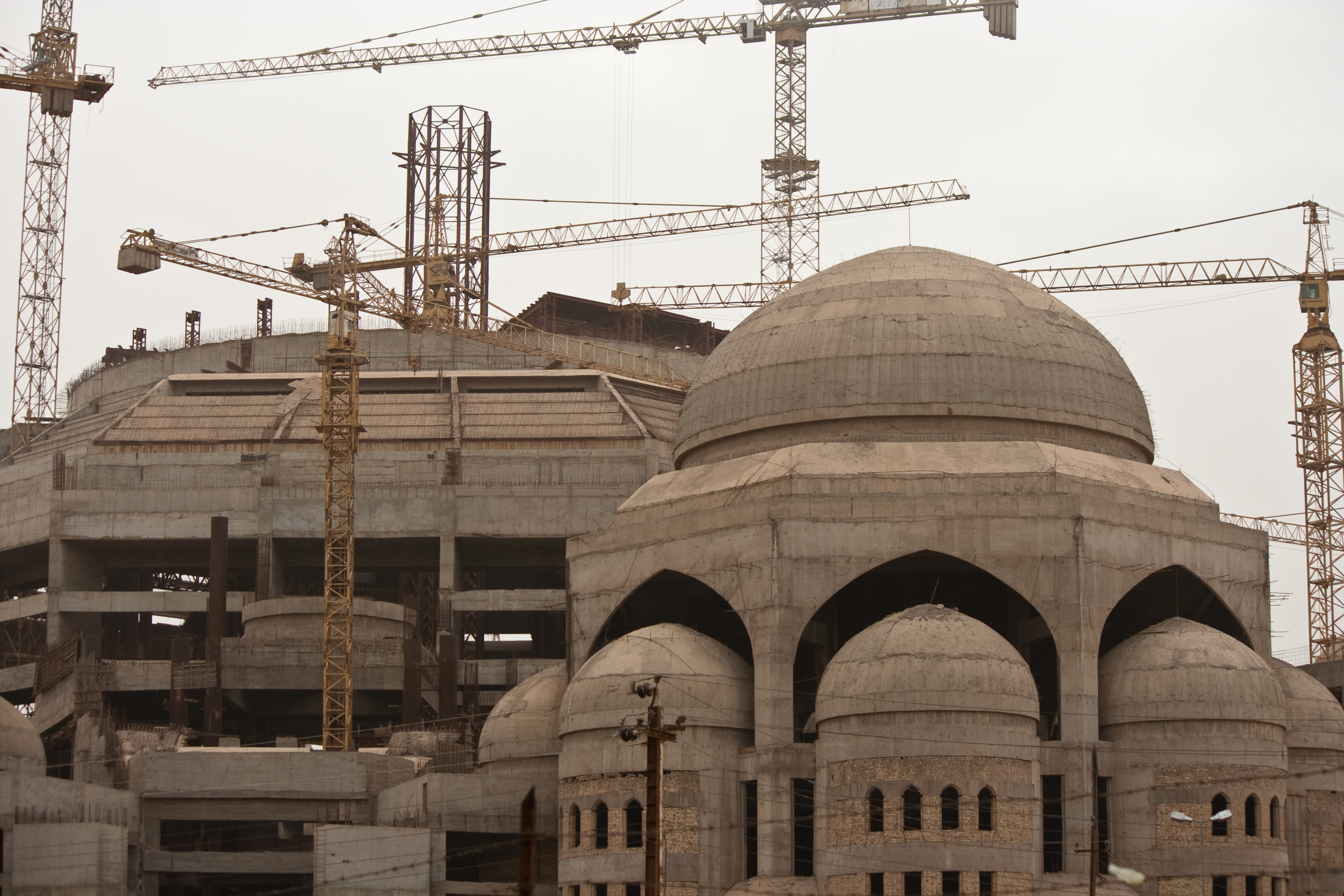
Closeup of the structure of the mosque.

The second phase began in 1999 under the orders of former Iraqi President Saddam Hussein and was designed to match the Taj Mahal in India and be one of the largest mosques in the world as well as accommodating 15,000 worshippers. It would have represented the embodiment of the features of Arab, Islamic and Iraqi architecture in contemporary artistic and technical ways and was planned to be completed by 2010. However, construction stopped in 2003 due to the US-led invasion of Iraq. The invasion led to many religious political parties entering the country and the dissolving of the Ministry of Endowments and Religious Affairs in favor of the split Sunni Endowment and Shi'a Endowment Offices. This split proved to be problematic for the mosque's ownership as large dispute between the offices was materialized.

The mosque's construction site was also taken over by the Iranian-backed Islamic Virtue Party due to its vast area, and its location in al-Mansour district. The mosque also saw various attacks during the Iraqi Civil War. Later, it was reported that 150 homeless families were living in the slums of the unfinished mosque. In January 2020, the judiciary ruled that the Shi'a Endowment Office had the right to build, and the ruling obligated the Islamic Virtue Party to pay an amount of US$200 million in compensation, but the ruling was not implemented. The Shi'a Endowment Office was also criticized for exploiting the site and managing it unilaterally without the rights it needed. As of 2025, the fate of the mosque remains unknown but some have retained hope that the mosque could be completed one day and be a unified mosque for both Sunni and Shi'a muslims.

== Disambiguation ==
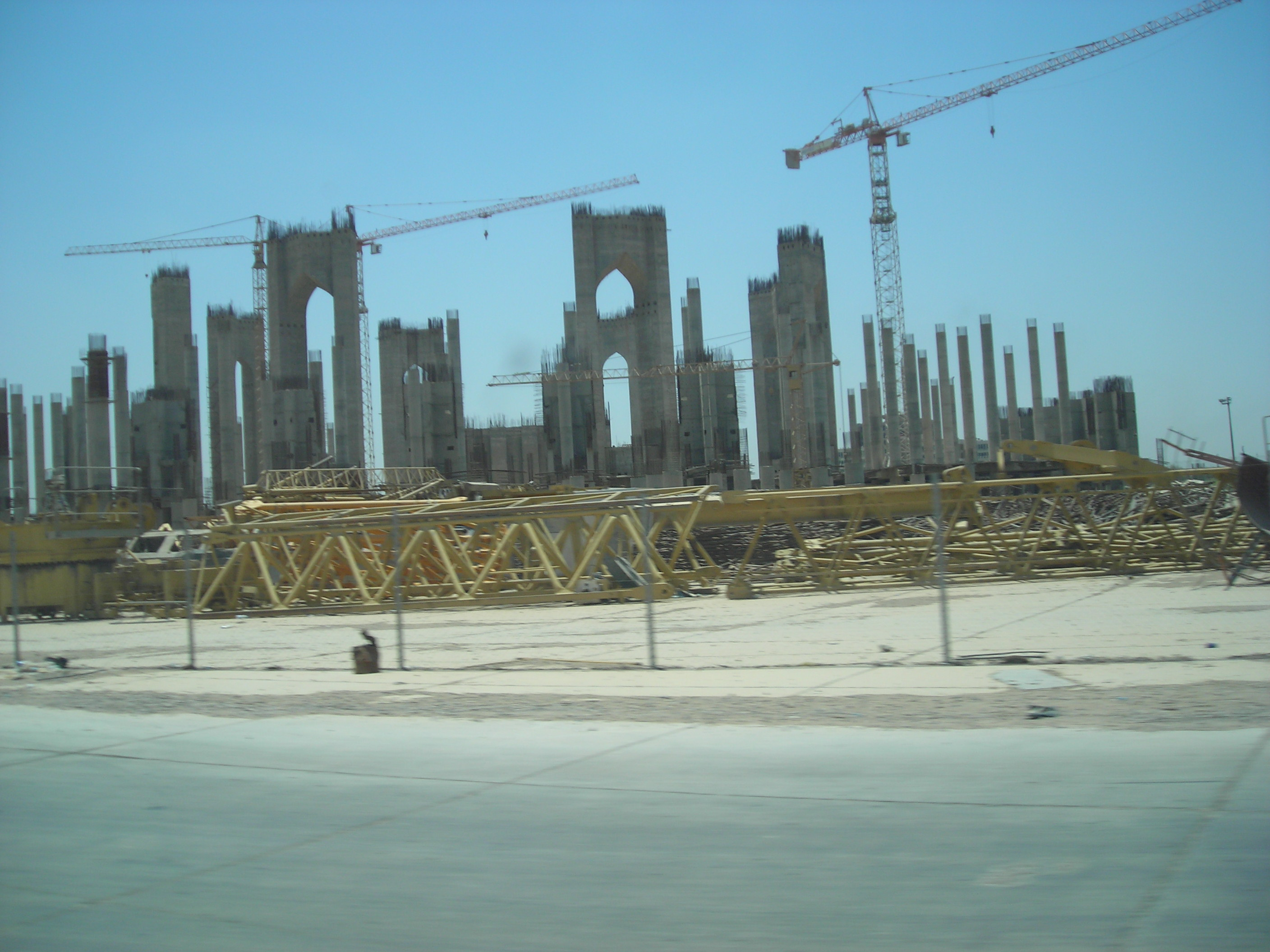
The structure of the Grand Saddam Mosque.

The mosque is sometimes confused with another mosque – the "Great Saddam Mosque", (also known as the "Grand Saddam Mosque") which was also being built at the time. That was being constructed a couple of miles to the north-east, at the site of the old al-Muthanna municipal airport located in the Karkh district. A specialized engineering office estimated its costs at US$500 million and would be implemented within three years. It was supposed to be even bigger than Al-Rahman, and centered on an artificial lake. It would have been surrounded by newly built university faculties, had a 60-metre-high (200 ft) dome, that was approximately 300 metres (980 ft) in diameter. Construction of this mosque was at an even earlier stage when stopped, with only some central columns built.

Both mosques were hoped to pave way for laying new foundations for architecture in Iraq.

== See also ==
- Islam in Iraq
- List of mosques in Baghdad
