= Iskan =

Series of cities in Iraq

Iskan الإسكان
- Housing City
- City of Al-Iskan in the Karbala Governorate
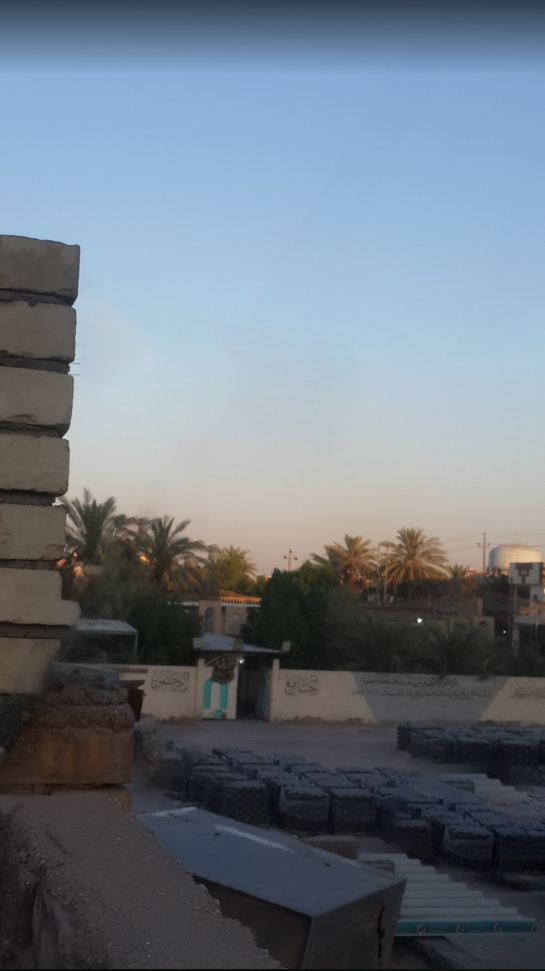
- Picture of Masjid Al Rahman located within central Al-Iskan, Karbala Governorate.
- Interactive map of Iskan
- Coordinates: 32°35′23.9136″N 44°1′22.8792″E
- Country: Iraq
- Governorate: Karbala
- City: Al-Iskan
- Created: 1959–1961
- Founder: Abd al-Karim Qasim

Iskan, Al Iskan or Al-Iskan (/ɑːlɪskɑːn/) Arabic: الإسكان, are a series of cities built and founded by the 24th prime minister of Iraq, the late Abdul-Karim Qasim. He built an Al-Iskan in each of the 18 provinces of Iraq as a bid to help implement a number of positive domestic changes that benefited Iraqi society, thus; oversaw the building of 35,000 residential units to house the poor and destitute of Iraq.

In the 1950s and 60s, poverty and hardship were widespread across Iraq and to combat this issue, Abd al-Karim Qasim built these cities to house the poor and homeless of Iraq meaning that all the residents of Al-Iskan in each governorate come from an impoverished and deprived background, due to this – these cities are seen as rough neighbourhoods where kidnapping, murder and other major crimes are rife compared to other areas of Iraq.

== Provinces where an Iskan was built ==
- Al Anbar
- Babil
- Baghdad
- Basra
- Dhi Qar
- Al-Qādisiyyah
- Diyala
- Duhuk
- Erbil
- Karbala
- Kirkuk
- Maysan
- Muthanna
- Najaf
- Nineveh
- Saladin
- Sulaymaniyah
- Wasit

== See also ==
- Governorates of Iraq
- List of cities in Iraq
- Iraq War
- Iraqi insurgency (2003–2011)
