= Mansour neighbourhood =

Mansour المنصور
- Neighborhood
- Etymology: Named after Abu Jaafar Al-Mansur, founder of Baghdad
- Country: Iraq
- Governorate: Baghdad Governorate
- District: Mansour district
- Time zone: UTC+3 (Arabia Standard Time)

Mansour is a neighborhood within Mansour district, Baghdad. It is numbered the 62nd neighbourhood of Baghdad. It is the home of many schools, shops and the Baghdad Zoo. Mansour is located 3 miles (4.8 km) from the Green Zone, and was once home to diplomats and other politicals.

The neighbourhood is named after Abu Jaafar Al-Mansur, the second caliph of the Abbasid Caliphate and the founder of Baghdad.

Near central Baghdad, Mansour is an upper-class neighbourhood that contains malls, universities and parks.

== History ==
By 2007, Mansour had become unsafe - as had many areas of Baghdad: car bombings, kidnappings, and killings by extremists became common. By 2009 the neighborhood had become somewhat safer, with residents returning to daily routines.

== Displacement ==
Mansour experienced an influx of families from other areas. These families were trying to escape the increased danger of the newcomers in Hayy Al-Jihad, Iskan and Al-Shu'ala. In order to curb this migration, arrivals are required to produce a recommendation from an Imam and a friend, relative or neighbour.

== Education ==
Local schools include Baghdad High School for Girls, and Al mansour middle school for boys.

== See also ==
Mansour district
