= Jill Carroll =

American former journalist (born 1977)

- Born: October 6, 1977 (age 48); Ann Arbor, Michigan, U.S.
- Education: B.A. in Journalism, 1999; University of Massachusetts at Amherst
- Occupations: Journalist (1999-2008); Firefighter (after 2008)

Jill Carroll (born October 6, 1977) is an American former journalist who worked for news organizations such as The Wall Street Journal, and the Christian Science Monitor. On January 7, 2006 while working for the Monitor, she was kidnapped in Iraq, attracting worldwide support for her release. Carroll was freed on March 30, 2006. After her release, Carroll wrote a series of articles for the Monitor on her recollection of her experiences in Iraq. She participated in a fellowship at Harvard University's Joan Shorenstein Center on the Press, Politics and Public Policy and returned to work for the Monitor. She later retired from journalism and began working as a firefighter.

== Early life and career ==
Carroll was born in Ann Arbor, Michigan. She attended Huron High School in Ann Arbor and graduated from the University of Massachusetts Amherst with a bachelor's degree in journalism in 1999. After college, Carroll worked as a reporting assistant in Washington, D.C., for the Wall Street Journal and worked for States News Service. Carroll then moved to Amman, Jordan as a journalist for The Jordan Times, before going to Iraq at the start of the US invasion in 2003 to report for various news outlets there.

== Kidnapping ==
On January 7, 2006, Carroll, along with an interpreter and driver, traveled to the Al-Adel neighborhood of Baghdad to interview Adnan al-Dulaimi, a Sunni politician and leader of the Iraqi People's Conference. After discovering that al-Dulaimi was not at his office, they left and soon after were ambushed by masked gunmen. The driver, Adnan Abbas, managed to escape, but Carroll was kidnapped and her interpreter, Alan Enwiyah, 32, was shot dead and his body abandoned nearby by the kidnappers during the abduction. Carroll's driver, quoted in a story posted on the Monitor's website, said gunmen jumped in front of the car, pulled him from it, and drove off with their two captives all within 15 seconds.

Enwiyah, also known as Alan John Ghazi, was formerly a well-known music retailer in Baghdad. According to the New York Times, Carroll was the 36th foreign journalist to be kidnapped in Iraq since the Iraq War began in March 2003.

Among the many kidnappings in Iraq, Carroll's kidnapping evoked one of the most widespread outcries. "We are urgently seeking information about Ms. Carroll and are pursuing every avenue to secure her release," Monitor editor Richard Bergenheim said in January. "I, her father and her sister are appealing directly to her captors to release this young woman who has worked so hard to show the sufferings of Iraqis to the world," Mary Beth Carroll told CNN's American Morning on January 19, 2006. In efforts to locate and rescue Carroll, U.S. forces initially raided a mosque in the west of the capital after a tip that "activities related to the kidnapping were being carried out inside," triggering angry protests from Sunni Muslim citizens.

Sunni political leader Adnan al-Dulaimi, whom Carroll was attempting to visit when she was kidnapped, gave a press conference on January 20, 2006, and gave the following statements.

This act has hurt me and makes me sad because the journalist was trying to meet me when she was kidnapped. After she left my office because she was unable to meet me, she was kidnapped 300 meters from my office. We are against violence by any group, and we call the government and U.S. forces to stop raiding houses, arresting women. I call upon the kidnappers to immediately release this reporter who came here to cover Iraq's news and defending our rights.

=== Media blackout ===
The Monitor requested that a media blackout regarding the kidnapping take place. One did happen, lasting until January 9. The Monitor claims it was 'criticized in some corners' for this choice.

=== First video and prisoner release ===
On January 17, 2006, Qatar-based news network Al-Jazeera aired a silent 20-second video-tape that showed Carroll, and indicated that in an accompanying message, an as-yet unidentified group was giving the United States 72 hours to release all female prisoners in Iraq. If that demand was not met, the group had threatened to kill Carroll. The silent video showed Carroll speaking in front of a white background. The Qatar-based station said the kidnappers identified themselves as members of a previously unknown armed group calling itself the "Brigades of Vengeance".

On January 27, 2006, five female Iraqi prisoners were released from U.S. custody. The U.S. military claimed the releases were already planned and had nothing to do with Carroll's kidnapper's initial threat to kill her within 72 hours unless all female detainees in Iraqi prisons were released.

=== Second and third videos ===
On January 30, 2006, a second video appeared on Al Jazeera showing Carroll wearing a headscarf and crying. The footage was timestamped with a date of January 28, 2006 and also featured the logo of the "Brigades of Vengeance" a militant group. Although the initial airing of the video did not include audio, Carroll is said to repeat earlier pleas to release all female hostages under American custody.

On February 9, 2006, a third video appeared on the private Kuwaiti TV channel Alrai TV. The 22-second video showed Carroll sitting in a chair behind a large floral pattern, in full Islamic dress. She is pleading for supporters to do whatever it takes to release her. Unlike the previous two videos, both audio and video is included. Carroll mentions that the date of the tape is February 2, 2006.

In the tape, she mentions letters that she has written as evidence for the authenticity of the tape. A letter accompanied the tape that was written by Carroll, but no previous letters have been found. The contents of the letter have not been disclosed. The following is a transcript from the video:

Today is Thursday, February 6-[corrects herself]-February 2, 2006. I'm with the mujahideen. I sent you a letter written by my hand that you wanted more evidence so we're sending you this new letter now just to prove that I am with the mujahideen. I'm here, I'm fine. Please, just do whatever they want, give them whatever they want as quickly as possible. There is very short time; please do it fast. That's all.

=== February 26 deadline ===
A Kuwaiti television station reported February 10, 2006 that the kidnappers had communicated to them a deadline set for February 26 for their demands to be met, or Carroll would be killed.

Earlier, people close to the kidnappers told Al Rai TV that Carroll is "in a safe house owned by one of the kidnappers in downtown Baghdad with a group of women." On February 14, 2006 Iraqi TV began airing a Public Service Announcement appealing for her release.

After the deadline passed, Iraqi Interior Minister Baqir Jabr al-Zubeidi believed Carroll to still be alive, according to ABC News.

=== International release efforts ===
Support for Jill Carroll's safe release was international. Efforts included various Muslim organizations and individuals who called for her release, ranging from The Council on American Islamic Relations (CAIR), to the Islamic militant group Hamas, Egypt's Muslim Brotherhood, and others. Carroll's twin sister Katie Carroll read a statement on Al Arabiya television asking for her sister to be released, and a Baghdad newspaper's front page read regarding Carroll: "She loves Iraq. Now she needs your help." According to The Guardian, Carroll's "employers at the Christian Science Monitor recognised instantly the inherently political character of terrorism and swiftly mobilized enough support in the Islamic world to get her through the first 'deadline'", and this was one of the main reasons she survived.

On February 5, 2006 in Rome a giant poster of Carroll, urging her release, was hung on the city hall building. The poster was removed after her release. In previous months, similar efforts were shown by hanging a photograph of the kidnapped Italian journalist Giuliana Sgrena in the same place. In Paris, on February 7, 2006, 30 white balloons were released to mark the 30 days of Carroll's captivity by the organization Reporters Without Borders. French actress Juliette Binoche appeared to show her support. On February 27, 2006, 25 organizations belonging to the International Freedom of Expression Exchange called for Carroll's immediate release.

=== Release ===
On March 30, 2006, Carroll entered the Sunni Iraqi Islamic Party offices in western Baghdad around midday and handed office personnel a letter, thought to be from her kidnappers, asking for help, a party official later said. At that time, Carroll said she had just been freed unharmed and was treated humanely during her captivity.

==== Final video ====
Within days of Carroll's release, a video of Carroll criticizing the occupation of Iraq and praising the insurgents as "good people fighting an honorable fight" appeared on an Islamist website. While counterterrorism expert Laura Mansfield, who had neither met nor interviewed Carroll, posited on CNN that Carroll's actions "may indicate she was experiencing a touch of Stockholm syndrome". The Christian Science Monitor, the paper Carroll worked for, reported that she was "forced to make propaganda video as price of freedom", saying:

The night before journalist Jill Carroll's release, her captors said they had one final demand as the price of her freedom: She would have to make a video praising her captors and attacking the United States, according to Jim Carroll.

In a long phone conversation with his daughter on Friday, Mr. Carroll says that Jill was "under her captor's control."

Ms. Carroll had been their captive for three months and even the smallest details of her life - what she ate and when, what she wore, when she could speak - were at her captors' whim. They had murdered her friend and colleague Allan Enwiya, "she had been taught to fear them," he says. And before making one last video the day before her release, she was told that they had already killed another American hostage.

That video appeared Thursday on a jihadist website that carries videos of beheadings and attacks on American forces. In it, Carroll told her father she felt compelled to make statements strongly critical of President Bush and his policy in Iraq.

Her remarks are now making the rounds of the Internet, attracting heavy criticism from conservative bloggers and commentators.

In fact, Carroll did what many hostage experts and past captives would have urged her to do: Give the men who held the power of life and death over her what they wanted.

"You'll pretty much say anything to stay alive because you expect people will understand these aren't your words," says Micah Garen, a journalist and author who was held captive by a Shiite militia in southern Iraq for 10 days in August 2004. "Words that are coerced are not worth dying over."

On April 1, 2006, Carroll released a statement through the website of the Christian Science Monitor, stating she had participated in the video critical of the United States and praiseworthy of her abductors only because she feared for her life and because her captors said they would let her go if she participated to their satisfaction. "Things that I was forced to say while captive are now being taken by some as an accurate reflection of my personal views. They are not." Carroll called her captors "criminals, at best" and said she remains "deeply angry" with them. United States Senator John McCain, who had also been a prisoner of war, said that Carroll was in “a terrible, terrible position” and that Americans should view her statements in that context, and not as her true beliefs.

==== Return home ====
On April 2, Carroll returned to Boston, where she was greeted at the airport by her editor Richard Bergenheim and whisked off to a reunion with her family. On the flight, she said "I finally feel like I am alive again. I feel so good. To be able to step outside anytime, to feel the sun directly on your face—to see the whole sky. These are luxuries that we just don't appreciate every day."

In August 2006, the newspaper announced that she would tell her story of living with the captives in an 11-part series starting on August 13. The series tells about life among the mujahideen.

==== Capture of militants ====
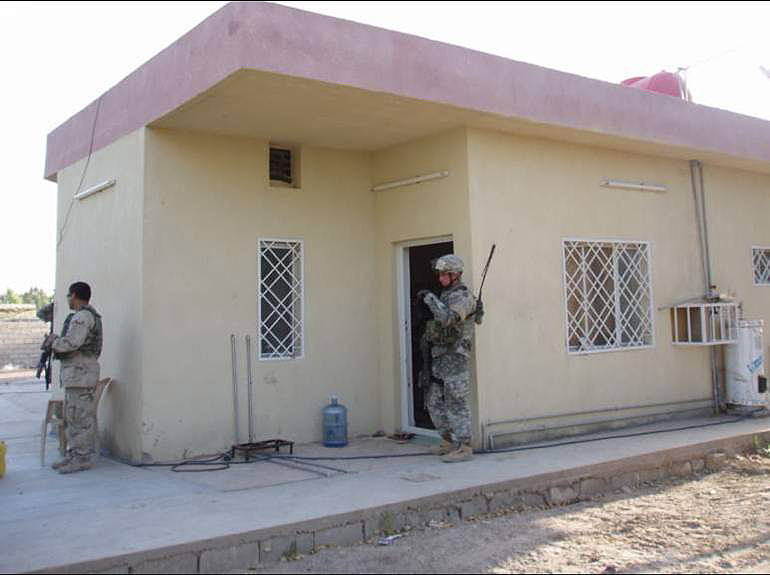
The house where Marines arrested three of four men responsible for kidnapping Jill Carroll. The fourth insurgent was later found and arrested.

In the fall of 2006, United States Marines arrested three of Carroll's captors, which led them to a fourth who was also arrested. Roughly two years later, on August 24, 2008, the United States military announced that on August 11 they captured Al-Qaeda militant Salim Abdallah Ashur al-Shujayri (aka Abu Uthman) in Baghdad, a man believed to be the planner behind Carroll's kidnapping.

== Post release ==
In 2006, Carroll participated in a fellowship at Harvard University's Joan Shorenstein Center on the Press, Politics and Public Policy, where she researched the decline of foreign news bureaus in the wake of changes in the newspaper industry.

She was given the Courage in Journalism Award in 2006 by the International Women's Media Foundation.

On August 19, 2008 it was announced that Carroll had started recruit training as a firefighter with the Fairfax County Fire and Rescue Department.

== See also ==
- List of kidnappings
- List of solved missing person cases (2000s)
