= Al-A'amiriya =

Al-A'amiriya العامرية
- Neighborhood
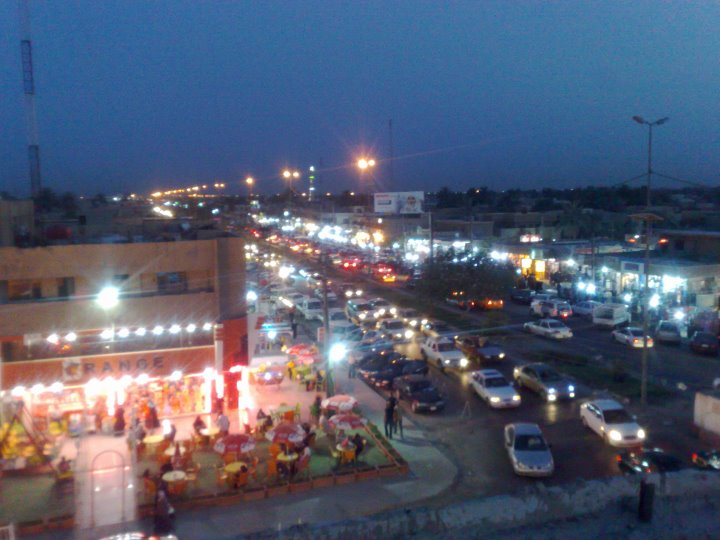
- Interactive map of Al-A'amiriya
- Location of Al-A'amiriya within Baghdad Location of Al-A'amiriya in Iraq
- Coordinates: 33°17′51″N 44°17′26″E
- Country: Iraq
- Governorate: Baghdad Governorate
- City: Baghdad

Al-A'amiriya (Arabic: العامرية) is a neighborhood situated in the western part of Baghdad, Iraq. It is located in the Karkh and Mansour district on the way to Anbar Province. It was an upper-class neighbourhood until about 2006, when it was devastated by war. Under Islamic State rule, many rural inhabitants were displaced from Anbar to Al-A'amiriya, resulting in even more demographic change.

This area is relatively modern, with its development beginning in the late 1960s. It is positioned between two key routes leaving Baghdad: the Airport Road and Abu Ghraib Road, the latter connecting to the city of Abu Ghraib and further extending to the western regions of Iraq. Due to its location in the west, Al-Amiriya has attracted many Sunni Arabs whose tribes trace their origins to the western parts of Iraq. This proximity to their ancestral regions in Anbar Governorate makes it a popular residential area for them. The majority of the local population belongs to the Al-Kubaisi, Al-Dulaim, and Zubaa tribes, with smaller communities of Christians and Kurds also present.

== Other names ==
The name is also written Amariya, Amariyah, Ameria, Ameriya, Amerya, Amiriya and Amiriyah.

== History ==
The Al-Amiriya district gets its name from the land it was built upon, which was once owned by the Al-Bu Amer clan during the early 16th century. It is situated between the districts of Al-Khadhra, Al-Atbaa, Al-Ghazaliya, and Abu Ghraib. Al-Amiriya is characterized by two main streets: Al-Amal Al-Shaabi and Al-Mantama. The area is known for its many upscale homes surrounded by beautiful gardens. There are nine mosques within the district, including Al-Ikhwa Al-Saliheen, Al-Hassanain, Maluki, Al-Mustafa, Al-Firdaws (Al-Takriti), Al-Abbas, Al-Kubaisi, Al-Ghafoor, and Al-Salam. In addition, the area houses a bank, pharmacies owned by the Samarra Pharmaceutical Manufacturing Company, and departments linked to the Ministry of Irrigation and the Ministry of Agriculture.

=== Gulf War ===
An aerial bombing attack killed at least 408 civilians on 13 February 1991 during the Gulf War, when an air-raid shelter ("Public Shelter No. 25") in the Amiriyah neighborhood of Baghdad, Iraq, was destroyed by the U.S. Air Force with two GBU-27 Paveway III laser-guided bombs. Human Rights Watch characterised the bombing as a war crime.

The bombing by Americans resulted in the deaths of over 400 women, children, and elderly people. Initially, Iraq commemorated this tragedy on 13 February each year. However, after the 2003 invasion, the observance was discontinued. It wasn't until February 2011 that the people of Al-Amiriya, alongside the Iraqi army, held a memorial to honour the victims of the massacre. Since then, this occasion has been observed annually.

=== Post-2003 ===
An image of The Serum and Vaccine Institute in Al-Amiriya was taken by a US reconnaissance satellite in November 2002.

Following the 2003 invasion of Iraq, Al-Amiriya experienced significant security issues and became one of the most dangerous areas in Baghdad. In response, American forces constructed a separation wall to isolate the district. In late May and early June of 2007, violent clashes broke out between gunmen from Al-Qaeda and fighters from the Islamic Army in Iraq. The situation in Al-Amiriya gradually improved after the "Knights of the Two Rivers" force, formed by local residents in collaboration with the sheikhs of Anbar tribes, gained control of the area. This led to a resurgence of local life, marked by an increase in the number of businesses opening up. Today, Al-Amiriya is home to about 4,500 displaced Sunni families.

Due to its sensitive security status, visitors to Al-Amiriya who are not residents are required to surrender their identification cards, which are returned upon leaving. Additionally, all individuals and vehicles entering the district are subjected to manual searches, causing considerable inconvenience to the local population.

== See also ==
- Amiriyah shelter bombing (1991)
