= Al-Washash =

- Location in Iraq
- Coordinates: 33°20′N 44°21′E
- Country: Iraq
- City: Baghdad
- District: Mansour

Al-Washash is a neighborhood of Baghdad, Iraq. Located within Mansour district, surrounded by Iskan from west, Al-Mutanabi from south, Al-Mothana Airport from east.
