= Al-Sa'adoon =

Neighborhood in Rusafa District of Baghdad, Iraq

Coordinates: 33°19′23″N 44°24′48″E

Al-Sa'adoon is a neighborhood in the Rusafa District of Baghdad, Iraq.

In July 2006, gunmen dressed as policemen kidnapped the head of the Iraq Olympic Committee and 50 others at a sports conference held in Al-Sa'adoon park.

In May 2017, seven anti-corruption activists were kidnapped from the house they lived in, in Al-Sa'adoon.
