= New Baghdad =

New Baghdad بغداد الجديدة
- District
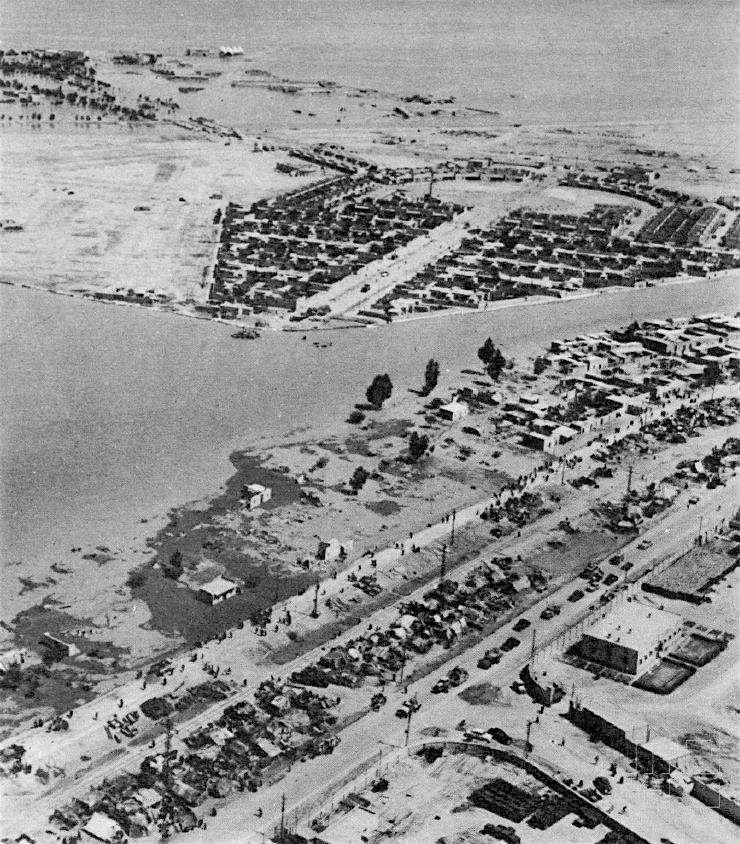
- Baghdad Al-Jidida district after the flood, Baghdad, 1954.
- Interactive map of New Baghdad
- Coordinates: 33°18′20″N 44°29′13″E
- Country: Iraq
- Governorate: Baghdad Governorate
- City: Baghdad

Area
  - Total: 120 km^{2} (46 sq mi)

Population (2018)
  - Total: 1,259,051
  - Density: 10,000/km^{2} (27,000/sq mi)

New Baghdad or Baghdad al-Jidida (Arabic: بغداد الجديدة) is one of nine administrative districts in Baghdad, Iraq. This district has eight Neighborhood Advisory Councils (NAC) and a District Advisory Council. It is located east of the city center. This district was renamed 9 Nissan or Tisa Nissan. Nissan is the word for April in the Babylonian calendar, although most Iraqis do not yet use that name (9 Nissan). It is also known as 7 Nissan. This district is one of the main areas for food and shopping.

== Features ==
- Shaab stadium, Bor Saeid sqr, Martyr's Monument (Al-Shaheed Monument)
- Muthana, Zayouna
- Ghadeer, Masaloon sqr
- New Baghdad neighbourhood (Baghdad al-Jadida), Alef Dar, al-Khaleej
- Habibiyya, Dur al-Umal, Baladiyat
- Mashtal, Ameen, Nafit, Rustomaniyya
- Fedhailia, Kamaliyya
- Al-Husseiniyya, Ma'amal, al-Rashid
- Al-Ubedy, Ma'amil 2

== See also ==
- List of places in Iraq
- Administrative districts in Baghdad
