= Zayouna =

Neighbourhood in Baghdad

Zayouna زيونة
- Neighbourhood
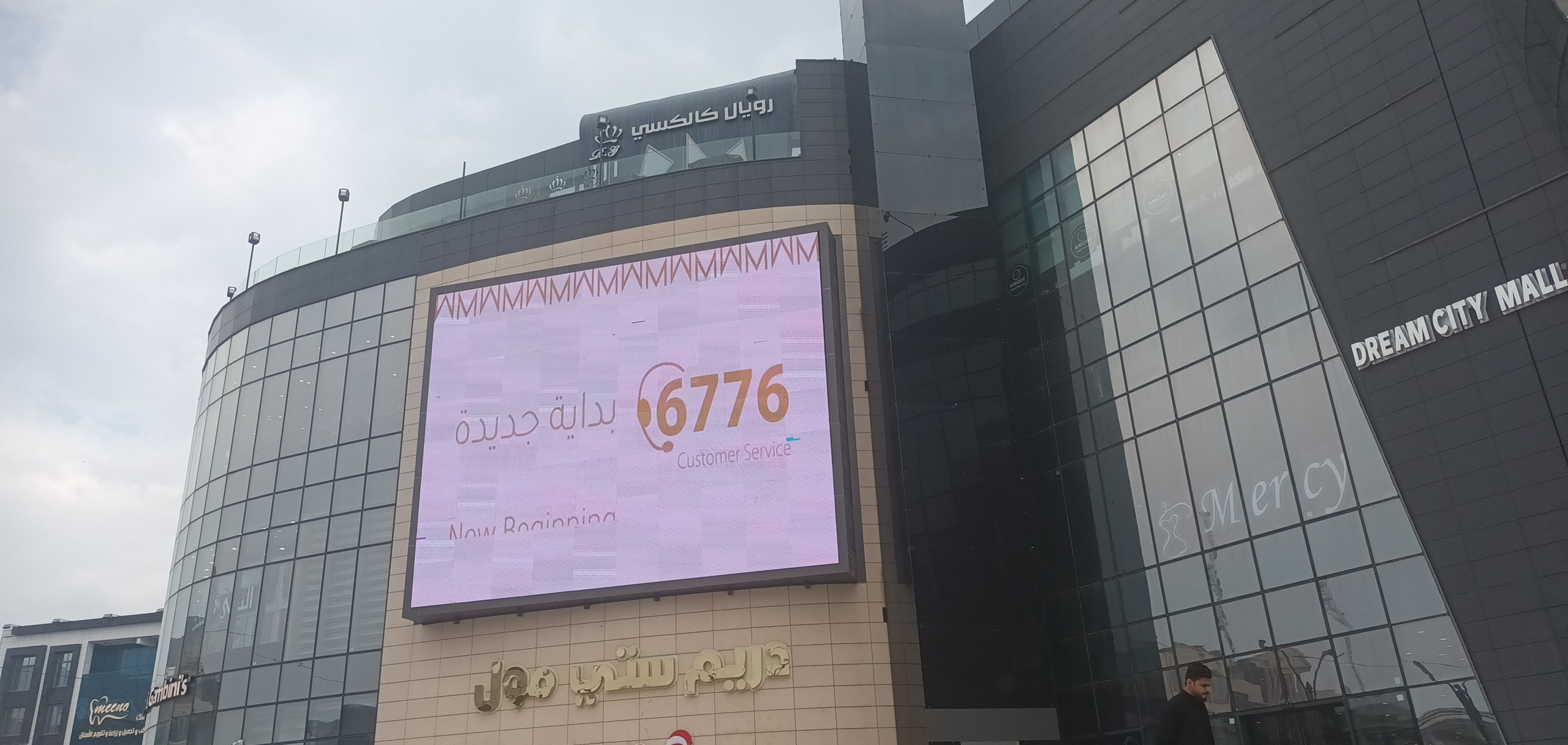
- Dream City Mall in Zayouna
- Interactive map of Zayouna
- Country: Iraq
- Governorate: Baghdad
- District: New Baghdad
- Postal code: 10091

Zayouna (Arabic: زيونة) is a neighbourhood of east Baghdad, Iraq. It is a diverse, upper middle-class area bordering the affluent Karrada suburb.

Organisations based in Zayouna include the Iraq Football Association; the "Baghdad Bulletin", Iraq's English-language news magazine; and Tariq bin Ziad High School, featured in British-American-French television documentary film, The Boys from Baghdad High.

Within the New Baghdad administrative district of the capital, Zayouna it is one of the 89 official neighbourhoods in Baghdad.
