= Hayy Al-Jami'a =

Neighborhood in Baghdad, Iraq

Hay Al-Jamiaa حي الجامعة
- Neighborhood
- Etymology: Named after university professors residing in the area
- Interactive map of Hay Al-Jamiaa
- Location in Baghdad, Iraq
- Coordinates: 33.32343°N 44.31821°E
- Country: Iraq
- Governorate: Baghdad Governorate
- District: Mansour district
- Established: 1960s
- Time zone: UTC+3 (Arabian Standard Time)

Hay Al-Jamiaa (Arabic: حي الجامعة) is a neighborhood near the Mansour district of Baghdad, Iraq.

Its small river name Aldawoody otherwise government removed small river and created an area for houses. The neighborhood was originally created during the mid-1960s, to provide housing and its old name Aldawoody was changed to Alkhaadraa. Now its name is Hay Al-Jamia and the government gave some of the houses for Ministry of Agriculture, some houses for a companion in Baath Party, some for police and some for university professors.

In old times (Hay Aljamiaa) three parts: the first part name alshurta means police houses, the second dor alrefaq means house of a companion in Baath Party and the third part jamiaa means university in Arabic. Hence, its full name is "Hay Al-Jamia" or "University Neighborhood".

During the sectarian troubles that plagued Baghdad, Hay Al-Jamia became one of the primary troubled areas in Western Baghdad, to the point that during the period from late 2006 to early 2007, the whole neighborhood became a de facto "ghost town". However, after the return of security in 2008, it regained much of its former vitality.

== Geography ==
Hay Al-Jamiaa is located in the western part of Baghdad and is bordered by several neighborhoods: to the north, it is bordered by Al-Adil; to the east, it shares borders with Al-Mansur and Al-Dawoodi; to the south, it is adjacent to Al-Shurta; and to the west, it is bordered by Al-Khadraa and Al-Ghazaliah.

== Transport ==
Al-Rabiaa Street (Arabic: شارع الربيع) is a major access road and the main market area, and passes from north to south in the eastern half of Al-Jami'a.
