= Hayy Ur =

Neighborhood of Baghdad, Iraq

- Neighborhood
- Location in Iraq
- Coordinates: 33°15′N 44°15′E

Hayy Ur is a neighborhood in northeastern Baghdad, Iraq, near Sadr city. In 2003, the United Nations Development Programme reported that almost every residence housing at least two families in Hayy Ur included a widow.

== See also ==
- Sha'ab, Baghdad
