= Al-Ubedy =

Neighborhood in Baghdad, Iraq

Al-Ubedy is a neighborhood in Baghdad, Iraq. It was one of the locations in Baghdad targeted with improvised bombs on 3 June 2016, killing 7 and injuring 28 people.
