= Al-Za'franiya =

Al-Za'franiya الزَّعْفَرَانِيَّة
- Neighbourhood
- Country: Iraq
- Governorate: Baghdad
- City: Baghdad

Al-Za'franiya district (Arabic: نَاحِيَة الزَّعْفَرَانِيَّة) is a neighborhood of Baghdad, Iraq. It is located in the south-east of Baghdad at the confluence of the Tigris and Diyala rivers. It is the main southern entrance to the city of Baghdad, located on the main road that connects the provinces south of Baghdad.
