= Al-Hurriya, Baghdad =

Neighborhood in Baghdad, Iraq

Al-Hurriya city, alternatively Al-Horaya, is a neighborhood of Baghdad, Iraq. With an area of 8 km² and a population of 350,000 people, it is one of the largest neighborhoods on Baghdad Road.

As of 5 April 2023, construction of a new 400-bed hospital in Al-Hurriya was expected to be completed by the end of 2024.
