= Al Khadhraa =

Neighbourhood of Baghdad

Coordinates: 33.3195°N 44.306972°E

Al Khadhraa is a neighborhood in Mansour district, western Baghdad, Iraq.

In 2004, the Iraqi Red Crescent Society opened a camp in Al Khadraa to provide shelter and assistance for families displaced by an upsurge in violence in Fallujah.

In May 2024, protesters demonstrated outside a branch of American fast-food restaurant KFC in Al Khadraa on its opening day.
