= Al-Shu'ala =

Al-Shu'ala حي الشعلة
- Neighborhood
- Etymology: "Flame" or "Torch" in Arabic
- Nicknames: Madinat Al-Noor, Shu'lat Al-Sadrain
- Interactive map of Al-Shu'ala
- Location in Iraq
- Coordinates (Al-Shu'ala center): 33.3681276°N 44.2746767°E
- Country: Iraq
- Governorate: Baghdad Governorate
- Established: 1960
- Predominantly Shiite Muslim (≈99%)
- Time zone: UTC+3 (AST)
- Postal code: 5789
- Area code: +964
- Al-Shu'ala consists of 27 sectors including Al-Rahmaniyya, Al-Dawanim, Um Najm, and Al-Jawadain. It is home to working-class families and includes a canal known as al-Mashrou‘ (المشروع).

Al-Shu'ala is a lower middle class district of Baghdad, Iraq. It is heavily populated and its inhabitants are working class families of limited income. There is a Shiite majority of nearly 99%.

Al-Shu'ala features a canal that stretches from the far east of the city to the west called al Mashrou'(المشروع) or "the project".

== Administrative Sectors ==
Al-Shu'ala is divided into 27 administrative sectors. Some of the most notable among them include:

- Al-Shu'ala (الشعلة)
- Al-Rahmaniyya (الرحمانية)
- Al-Dawanim (الدوانم)
- Um Najm (أم نجم)
- Al-Jawadain (الجوادين)
- Al-Salamiyat (السلاميات)
- Al-Sabiyat (الصابيات)
- Al-Dahna (الدهنة)
- Al-Khateeb (الخطيب)
