= Al-Adel =

Neighborhood of Baghdad, Iraq

Coordinates: 33°11′24″N 44°09′00″E

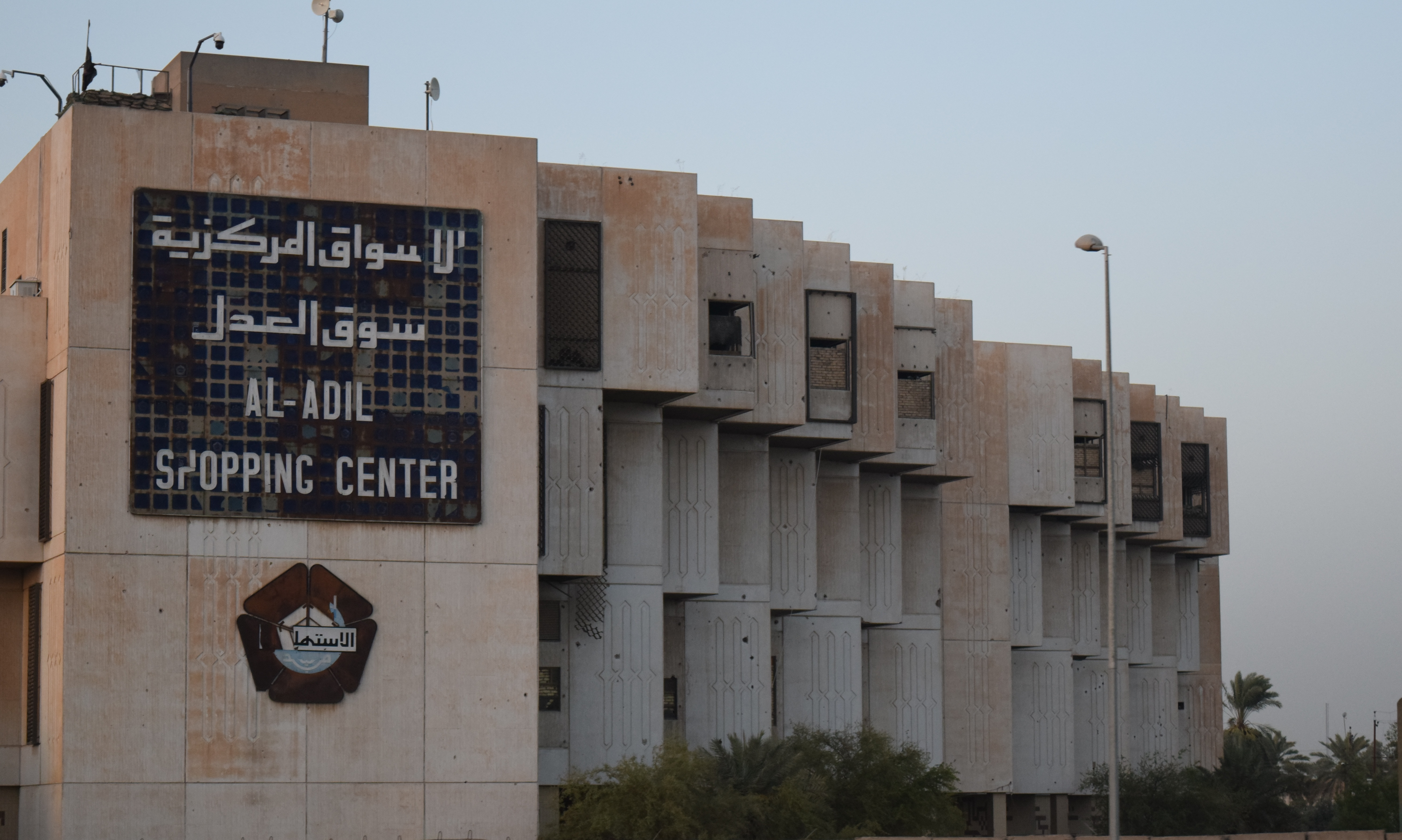
الاسواق المركزية حي العدل.jpg

Al-Adel is a Neighbourhood of Baghdad, Iraq. It is located in Mansour district, in the portion of the city that lies west of the Tigris River.

== Iraq War ==
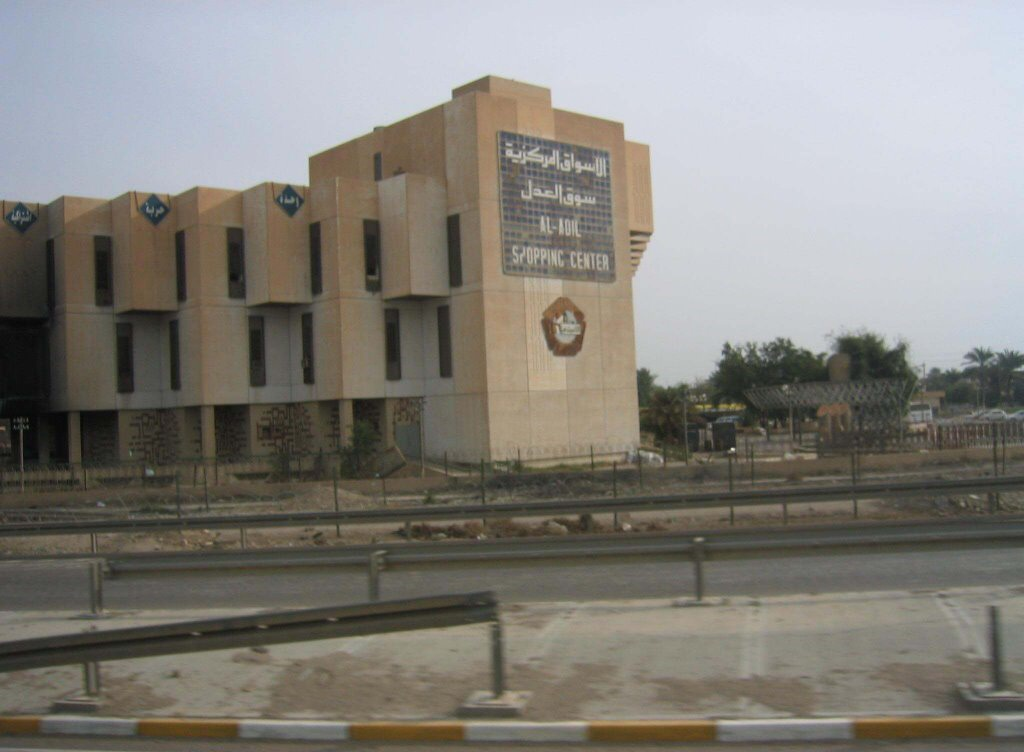
Al-Adel Central Mall

In 2006, during the Iraqi civil war, the largely middle- and upper-class and mixed Shia-Sunni neighborhood of Al-Adel was taken over by militants linked to Al-Qaeda, forcing many Shiite residents to leave.

It was also the site of the kidnapping of journalist Jill Carroll in 2006, and of the residence of Adnan al-Dulaimi, a Sunni leader implicated in the kidnapping. Many displaced residents were able to return in the years that followed.

In 2007, Al-Adel Shopping Center became the site of large-scale gun fighting.
