= List of bombings during the Iraqi insurgency (2011–2013) =

This article lists major bombings during the Iraqi Insurgency (18 December 2011 – 30 December 2013) following the withdrawal of US troops at the end of the Iraq War.

== Bombings ==
Date	City	Attack	Deaths	(Alleged) Perpetrator	Source
22 December 2011	(Iraq) Baghdad	22 December 2011 Baghdad bombings	69	Islamic State	
5 January 2012	(Iraq) Nasiriyah	5 January 2012 Iraq bombings	44	Islamic State	
5 January 2012	(Iraq) Baghdad	5 January 2012 Iraq bombings	29	Islamic State	
14 January 2012	(Iraq) Basra	14 January 2012 Basra bombing	53	Islamic State	
27 January 2012	(Iraq) Baghdad	27 January 2012 Baghdad bombing	32	Islamic State	
23 February 2012	(Iraq) Baghdad (Iraq) Tikrit	23 February 2012 Iraq attacks	83	Islamic State	
20 March 2012	(Iraq) Various cities	20 March 2012 Iraq attacks	52	Islamic State	
13 June 2012	(Iraq) Various cities	13 June 2012 Iraq attacks	93	Islamic State	
23 July 2012	(Iraq) Various cities	23 July 2012 Iraq attacks	116	Islamic State	
16 August 2012	(Iraq) Various cities	16 August 2012 Iraq attacks	128	Islamic State	
9 September 2012	(Iraq) Various cities	9 September 2012 Iraq attacks	108	Islamic State	
19 March 2013	(Iraq) Various cities	19 March 2013 Iraq attacks	98	Islamic State	
15 April 2013	(Iraq) Various cities	15 April 2013 Iraq attacks	75	Islamic State	
18 April 2013	(Iraq) Baghdad	18 April 2013 Baghdad bombing	27	Islamic State	
15 - 21 May 2013	(Iraq) Various cities	May 2013 Iraq attacks	449	Islamic State	
27 May 2013	(Iraq) Baghdad	27 May 2013 Baghdad bombings	71	Islamic State	
10 June 2013	(Iraq) Various cities	10 June 2013 Iraq attacks	94	Islamic State	
16 June 2013	(Iraq) Various cities	10 June 2013 Iraq attacks	54	Islamic State	
2 - 14 July 2013	(Iraq) Various cities	July 2013 Iraq attacks	389	Islamic State	
1 September 2013	(Iraq) Camp Ashraf	2013 Camp Ashraf massacre	52	Kata'ib Hezbollah and Asa'ib Ahl al-Haq	
20 September 2013	(Iraq) Samarra	20 September Samarra attack	25	Islamic State	
21 September 2013	(Iraq) Various cities	21 September 2013 Iraq attacks	115	Islamic State	
4 December 2013	(Iraq) Various cities	4 December 2013 Iraq attacks	35	Islamic State	
25 December 2013	(Iraq) Baghdad	2013 Baghdad Christmas Day bombings	38	Islamic State	No group claimed responsibility for the attacks.
