= List of terrorist incidents in 2012 =

This is a list of terrorist incidents which took place in 2012, including attacks by violent non-state actors for political motives. Note that terrorism related to drug wars and cartel violence is not included in these lists. Ongoing military conflicts are listed separately.

== Guidelines ==
- To be included, entries must be notable (have a stand-alone article) and described by a consensus of reliable sources as "terrorism".
- List entries must comply with the guidelines outlined in the manual of style under MOS:TERRORIST.
- Casualty figures in this list are the total casualties of the incident including immediate casualties and later casualties (such as people who succumbed to their wounds long after the attacks occurred).
- Casualties listed are the victims. Perpetrator casualties are listed separately (e.g. x (+y) indicate that x victims and y perpetrators were killed/injured).
- Casualty totals may be underestimated or unavailable due to a lack of information. A figure with a plus (+) sign indicates that at least that many people have died (e.g. 10+ indicates that at least 10 people have died) – the actual toll could be considerably higher. A figure with a plus (+) sign may also indicate that over that number of people are victims.
- If casualty figures are 20 or more, they will be shown in **bold**. In addition, figures for casualties more than 50 will also be **underlined**.
- Incidents are limited to one per location per day. If multiple attacks occur in the same place on the same day, they will be merged into a single incident.

== List ==
Total Incidents: 33

Date	Type	Dead	Injured	Location	Article	Details	Perpetrator	Part of
5 January	Suicide bombings, bombings	73+	149	Nasiriyah and Baghdad, Iraq	5 January 2012 Iraq bombings	A wave of bombings targeting Shia Muslims across Iraq. A suicide bomber blew himself up in Nasiriyah, killing 44 and injuring 81. In Baghdad at least 4 bombs exploded in the districts of Kadhimiya and Sadr City, killing 29 and injuring 68.	Islamic State of Iraq (suspected)	
6–7 January	Shootings, mortar attacks, IEDs	8	50	Baghdad, Mosul and Balad, Iraq	5 January 2012 Iraq bombings	A string of shootings and bombings followed the wave of bombings two days earlier. Most of the attacks appeared to target Shia Muslims and there was a mortar attack directed at the Green Zone during a military parade.		
6 January	Suicide bombing	26+	63+	Damascus, Syria	January 2012 al-Midan bombing	A suicide bomber blew his explosive vest in the Al-Midan district near a police station and a bus full of recruits. The Syrian National Council, the Muslim Brotherhood and the Free Syrian Army accused the government of orchestrating this to reduce attention on its crackdown and to justify its alleged brutality.	Al-Nusra Front to Protect the Levant	
10 January	Car bombing	29	50	Jamrud, Khyber Agency, Pakistan	2012 Khyber Agency bombing	Suspected car bombing near a fueling station. The city, which lies 25 km west of Peshawar, is considered the gateway to the Khyber Pass used by NATO fuel convoys to bring supplies into Afghanistan.		
14 January	Suicide bombing, IEDs, car bombing	55	141	Basra, Iraq	14 January 2012 Basra bombing	A suicide bomber dressed as a policeman attacked a crowd of Shiite pilgrims and security forces at a checkpoint. The blast coincided with several other small attacks in Tikrit, Mosul and Baqubah.		
17 January	Shooting, kidnapping	5	3	Afar Region, Ethiopia	2012 Afar region tourist attack	Unidentified attackers shot and killed at least 5 foreign tourists and kidnapped 4 people near the Erta Ale volcano. At least three other tourists were injured and two Germans were among the kidnapped together with 2 Ethiopians. The dead included two Germans, two Hungarians and one Austrian. The government placed the blame on "members of a group that was trained and armed by the Eritrean government.		
10 February	Suicide car bombings	28	235	Aleppo, Syria	February 2012 Aleppo bombings	Two bombings shook the city, targeting the security and military headquarters. Government sources and state media said the blasts were caused by two suicide car bombs. Among the 28 victims were 24 members of the security forces and 4 civilians.	Al-Nusra Front to Protect the Levant or Free Syrian Army	
13 February	Car bomb	0	4	New Delhi, India	2012 attacks on Israeli diplomats	An Israeli diplomat's car exploded near the Indian prime minister's residence, injuring the wife of an embassy staff member and at least three other people, in what appeared to be a coordinated, two-pronged attack against Israeli missions in India and Georgia.	Islamic Revolutionary Guard Corps	
19 February	Suicide bombing	19	26	Baghdad, Iraq	2012 Baghdad police academy bombing	A suicide car bomber killed police officers and cadets in front of an academy.		
27 February	Stabbings	24	18	Yecheng, China	2012 Yecheng attack	Eight Uyghur men led by religious extremist Abudukeremu Mamuti attacked pedestrians with axes and knives on a crowded street. Police fought the group, killing all and capturing Mamuti. One police officer died and four others were injured, while 15 pedestrians died from Mamuti's assault and 14 others were injured.	East Turkestan Islamic Movement (suspected)	
11–22 March	Shootings	7 (+1)	5	Toulouse and Montauban, France	Toulouse and Montauban shootings	A radical Islamist shot and killed three paratroopers in two separate incidents in and around Toulouse. On March 10 a lone paratrooper was killed in Toulouse and five days later three other soldiers were attacked near a cash machine in Montauban, 50 kilometers south of Toulouse. The attacker, who drove a black motorbike, managed to kill two of them and critically injure the third. In all cases the soldiers were from immigrant families.	Mohammed Merah	
17 March	Car bombings	27	140	Damascus, Syria	March 2012 Damascus bombings	Car bombs were detonated in front of the aviation intelligence and criminal security departments. The government blamed the attack on terrorists, while the opposition maintained that the attacks were orchestrated.	Al-Nusra Front to Protect the Levant	
20 March	Suicide bombings, car bombs, shootings	52	~250	Baghdad and 10 other cities, Iraq	20 March 2012 Iraq attacks	Numerous car bombings and suicide attacks shook Baghdad, as well as Karbala and Kirkuk among others.	Islamic State of Iraq	
31 March	Bombings	16	321	Yala and Hat Yai, Thailand	2012 Southern Thailand bombings	Three bombs went off in the business district around lunchtime, killing at least eleven and injuring more than 110 others. Separately, a blast took place in a high-rise hotel in neighboring Songkhla Province. This second attack killed at least five and left more than 220 wounded.	Patani United Liberation Organisation suspected	
15 April	Suicide bombings, firefights, sieges	51	44	Kabul and Nangarhar, Paktia and Logar provinces, Afghanistan	April 2012 Afghanistan attacks	Militants staged highly coordinated attacks in four Afghan provinces and the capital Kabul. Among the targets were the U.S., German, British and Russian Embassies, NATO bases, the Afghan Parliament, airports and a military academy. The siege in Kabul's heavily guarded diplomatic quarter started around 1 PM and went on for 18 hours. Among the dead were 8 Afghan soldiers and four civilians.	Afghan Taliban, Haqqani Network suspected	
27 April	Bombings	0	27	Dnipropetrovsk, Ukraine	2012 Dnipropetrovsk explosions	At least four explosions hit the city.		
10 May	Suicide car bombings	55	~400	Damascus, Syria	10 May 2012 Damascus bombings	A pair of suicide bombers detonated two vehicles packed more than 1,000 kilograms of explosives in front of a military intelligence building. The 10-story complex lost its façade.	Al-Nusra Front to Protect the Levant	
19 May	School Bombing	1	5	Brindisi, Italy	Brindisi school bombing	A 68-year-old storekeeper detonated three gas cylinder bombs hidden in a rubbish bin in front of the "Morvillo Falcone" vocational school. The attack killed one student and injured 5 others. The attacker, who was arrested on June 8, justified his deed as a form of protest, giving generic answers.	Giovanni Vantaggiato	
21 May	Suicide bombing	120+	350+	Sana'a, Yemen	2012 Sanaa bombing	A suicide bomber dressed as a soldier blew himself up during a rehearsal for the annual Unity Day parade.	Al Qaeda in the Arabian Peninsula	
13 June	Car bombings, shootings	93	312	Baghdad and six other cities, Iraq	13 June 2012 Iraq attacks	A wave of attacks across Iraq. At least 10 bombings took place across Baghdad, most of them aimed at Shi'ite pilgrims celebrating a religious holiday. In the central and southern parts of the country, attacks took place in Karbala, Balad, Taji and Hillah, where two car bombs killed at least 22 at a local restaurant frequented by policemen. Bombings shook Kirkuk as well, including an explosion at the headquarters for Kurdish President Massoud Barzani that killed a bystander and left several others injured. Separately, unidentified gunmen shot and killed at least three security officers in the capital.	Islamic State of Iraq	
29 June	Airplane hijacking	2	13	Hotan, Xinjiang, China	Tianjin Airlines Flight GS7554	On a flight between Hotan and Urumqi, six ethnic Uyghur men, one of whom allegedly professed his motivation as jihad, announced their intent to violently hijacking. In the ensuing resistance by passengers, two hijackers were killed, and another two hospitalized; 13 passengers and crew were injured by the aluminum crutch and explosive-armed hijackers.		
18 July	Suicide bombing	6 (+1)	30+	Burgas, Bulgaria	2012 Burgas bus bombing	A suicide bomber on board a bus killed 5 Israeli tourists and the bus driver.	Hezbollah	
18 July	Bombing	4	2	Damascus, Syria	18 July 2012 Damascus bombing	A remotely operated bomb exploded in the National Security Building on Rawda Square during a meeting of Cabinet ministers and senior security officials. Minister of Defense Dawoud Rajiha was killed along with deputy vice president Hasan Turkmani and Assef Shawkat, President Bashar al-Assad's brother-in-law and deputy defense minister. Several other senior officials were seriously injured, including interior minister Mohammad Ibrahim al-Shaar and intelligence chief Hisham Bekhtyar, who died two days after the attack.	Free Syrian Army or Liwa al-Islam	
23 July	Car bombings, suicide bombings, shootings	116	299	across Iraq	23 July 2012 Iraq attacks	Bombings and gun attacks across Iraq in a coordinated surge of violence against mostly Shi'ite Muslim targets. The deadliest attacks occurred north of Baghdad, where insurgents attacked an army post near Dhuluiya and set off at least seven car bombs in nearby Taji, killing a total of 48 and leaving scores injured. Explosions rocked the capital's Sadr City neighborhood, as well as Kirkuk, Mosul, Samarra, Dujail, Khan Bani Saad City, Tuz Khormato and Diwaniyah. Militants also attacked various army checkpoints in Diyala Province.	Islamic State of Iraq	
1 August	Serial bomb blasts	0	1	Pune, India	2012 Pune bombings	Series of four coordinated low intensity bombings.		
5 August	Shooting	16	7	Kerem Shalom, Egypt	August 2012 Sinai attack	Attack on a police station in North Sinai on the border between Egypt and Israel.		
6–7 August	Shooting	22	~20	Okene, Kogi State, Nigeria	Deeper Life Bible Church shooting	Three men entered a church during evening Bible Study, turning off the electricity and shooting at worshippers. At least 19 were killed and around 20 others injured. Hours later gunmen on a motorcycle attacked an army patrol, killing 2 soldiers and a civilian.		
16 August	Suicide bombings, car bombs, shootings	128	417	across Iraq	16 August 2012 Iraq attacks	Attacks across Baghdad, with most casualties from two car bombings in the predominantly Shi'ite districts of Zaafaraniya and Sadr City. Other attacks took place across the central and northern parts of the country, killing 76 and injuring 240 others.		
20 August	Car bombing	9	69	Gaziantep, Turkey	2012 Gaziantep bombing	A remote-controlled car bomb exploded outside a police station close to the border with Syria.	PKK (suspected)	
9 September	Bombings, shootings	108	371	across Iraq	9 September 2012 Iraq attacks	A wave of attacks across Iraq. Car bombs and shootings erupted across numerous cities, while insurgents assault a small Iraqi Army base near Dujail. Two early blasts in Baghdad killed four, before a late night series of car bombings shook the capital, killing 32 and leaving 102 injured just hours after fugitive Iraqi Vice President Tariq al-Hashimi was sentenced to death in absentia for his alleged involvement in "death squads".	Islamic State of Iraq	
11 September	Coordinated attack, armed assault, arson	4	10	Benghazi, Libya	2012 Benghazi attack	Heavily armed militants stormed and burned the American Consulate, killing the United States ambassador to Libya, J. Christopher Stevens, and three others: Sean Smith, a Foreign Service Officer, and Tyrone S. Woods and Glen A. Doherty, both former members of the Navy SEALs who helped protect diplomatic personnel	Ansar al-Shariah	
19 October	Car bombing	8	110	Beirut, Lebanon	October 2012 Beirut bombing	A car bomb exploded at Sassine Square. Officials said the target was Wissam al-Hassan, the head of the intelligence branch of the Internal Security Forces and a prominent Sunni figure in the country.		
21 November	Bombing	0	28	Tel Aviv, Israel	2012 Tel Aviv bus bombing	Explosion on a passenger bus near the defense ministry hours before an Egyptian-brokered truce was called to halt Operation Pillar of Defense in the Gaza Strip.		
