= Abu Disher =

Abu Disher, also known as Abu Disheer, is a neighborhood of Baghdad, Iraq. It is located in the eastern portion of the Al Rashid district, south of Dora, along the Hillad Road.احد اشهر منازله منزل جواد وقاسم واثير
