= 22 December 2011 Baghdad bombings =

Bomb attacks in Baghdad, Iraq

2011 Baghdad bombings
- Part of the Iraqi insurgency
- Location: Baghdad, Iraq
- Date: 22 December 2011 (UTC+03:00)
- Target: Civilian population; government offices
- Attack type: Suicide bombings, suicide car bombing, roadside bombs, sticky bombs, shooting
- Deaths: 60 to 72
- Injuries: 160 to 217
- Perpetrator: Islamic State of Iraq

On 22 December 2011, a series of coordinated attacks occurred in Baghdad, Iraq, killing 69 people. This was the first major attack following U.S. withdrawal from Iraq.

== Attacks ==
Iraqi officials reported at least 14 bombs went off in the capital, targeting a total of 11 neighborhoods. The Iraqi health ministry estimated 69 deaths and at least 169 wounded. The majority of attacks occurred in Shiite areas, with the exception of an IED attack in the Sunni enclave of Adhamiyah. The worst attack, the only confirmed suicide bombing, took place in the Karrada district where a bomber drove an ambulance into a government anti-corruption office, killing 25 and injuring 62. Local policemen who were standing guard let the ambulance driver through because of the vehicle and his assurances that he was trying to reach a nearby hospital.

The attacks were the first assault on the capital after the beginning of an apparent sectarian crisis in the government, with prime minister Nouri al-Maliki issuing an arrest warrant for vice president Tariq Al-Hashimi just days before the incidents. Journalists on the ground reported that security forces were blocking access to bombing sites and that the usually packed Baghdad streets were almost deserted in the aftermath of the bombings.

In addition to the attacks in the capital, several other attacks took place around the country, including gunmen killing a family of five and a local bodyguard in the city of Baqubah. Two of the family members were members of a Sunni Awakening council. Several shootings took place in the city of Mosul, leaving two dead and four injured. Other attacks left five people injured in Musayyib and Jurf Al-Sakhar south of the capital, and a body was found in Kirkuk.

Later in the evening several explosions rocked Baghdad once more. Local journalists reported at least 4 more blasts happening around 10 o'clock local time. The official death toll was raised to 72 after these further bombings, which included attacks in the Al-Shurtta and Al-Jihad districts in southwestern Baghdad.

== Investigations ==
=== Speculations ===
There were no immediate claims of responsibility for the bombings. However, reports suggested the participation of the Islamic State of Iraq, as the attack mostly appeared to hit Shiite neighborhoods. Vice-President al-Hashimi, while in hiding in Iraqi Kurdistan, accused elements in the Iraqi government of orchestrating the attacks.

The Islamic State of Iraq claimed the 22 Dec. Baghdad bombings in a statement released on jihadist Internet forums. The statement was translated by the SITE Intelligence Group. The claim was made on 26 December 2011; the day after another suicide attack killed seven policemen outside the Interior Ministry.

== Claim of liability ==
The Islamic State of Iraq said the attacks were the latest in what they described as a "series of special invasions ... to support the weak Sunnis in the prisons of the apostates and to retaliate for the captives who were executed by the Safavid [Persian or Iranian] government."

The term "Safavid government" refers to the government of Prime Minister Nouri al Maliki, a Shia politician who is accused by the Islamic State of Iraq of being under Iran's sphere of influence. Maliki has cracked down on Sunni politicians, and immediately after the US withdrawal of its troops this month, issued an arrest warrant for Vice President Tariq Hashemi. The move plunged Iraq into political crisis.

Islamic State of Iraq said the targets in the 22 December attack in Baghdad had been "accurately surveyed and explored," and the "operations were distributed between targeting security headquarters, military patrols and gatherings of the filthy ones of the al-Dajjal Army [Shia warlord Muqtada al Sadr's Mahdi Army]." The terror group said it "knows where and when to strike, and the mujahideen will never stand with their hands tied while the pernicious Iranian project showed its ugly face and what it wants with Sunnis in Iraq became obvious and exposed." The Islamic State of Iraq briefly described the suicide attack that targeted a security headquarters in Karrada in Baghdad, and said that details of the other attacks that day would be "published later on."

== Reaction ==
Ayad Allawi, leader of Iraqiya party, blamed the government for the violence. Allawi warned that "violence would continue as long as people are left out of the political process."

U.S. military officials have expressed concern about the "resurgence of al-Qaeda" as the American military left the country.

== See also ==
- List of bombings during the Iraqi insurgency (2011–2013)
