= 2012 Baghdad police academy bombing =

Suicide bombing

- Part of Iraq conflict (2003–present)
- 2012 Baghdad police academy bombing (Iraq) Baghdad
- Location: Baghdad, Iraq
- Date: 19 February 2012
- Target: Police recruits
- Attack type: suicide bombing
- Deaths: 19
- Injuries: 26

The 2012 Baghdad police academy bombing occurred on 19 February 2012 when a suicide bomber targeted police recruits in Baghdad, Iraq, killing 19 and injuring 26 others. The police academy, located in the northeastern part of the city near the Interior Ministry building is a fortified compound with security barriers. As a crowd of police officers and recruits stepped out onto the road, a suicide bomber driving a car rigged with explosives careered into them, causing an explosion. It was the deadliest attack in Iraq since 27 January when a suicide bomber targeted a hospital in Baghdad, killing 31. 2 al Qaida homicide bombers also attacked the Baghdad Police College on 6 December 2005, murdering 47 police cadets and officers and sending another 85 to area hospitals.

== See also ==
- 5 January 2012 Iraq bombings
- 23 July 2012 Iraq attacks
- 2003 Jordanian embassy bombing in Baghdad
