= 9 September 2012 Iraq attacks =

Terrorist attacks by Salafi jihadists

9 September Iraq attacks
- Part of Iraqi insurgency
- Location: across Iraq
- Date: 9 September 2012 (UTC+3)
- Target: Iraqi security forces, Shi'ite civilians
- Attack type: Car bombings, roadside bombings, shootings
- Weapons: Car bombs, IEDs, automatic weapons
- Deaths: at least 108
- Injuries: at least 371
- Perpetrator: Islamic State of Iraq

The 9 September 2012 Iraq attacks were a series of coordinated bombings and shootings across the capital Baghdad and several major cities in the north and south of the country. At least 108 people were killed and 371 injured in the first major insurgent action since a similar wave of violence almost a month earlier.

== Background ==
The attacks occurred about nine months following the withdrawal of the United States military forces from the area, leaving the security of the country in the hands of the Iraqi security forces. Several major attacks took place in the months of June, July and August, following a statement released by Islamic State of Iraq to announce the start of a new "offensive".

During the afternoon, fugitive Iraqi Vice President Tariq al-Hashimi and his son-in-law were sentenced to death in absentia based on the verdict of the Central Criminal Court of Iraq that found him guilty of two murders. Abdul Sattar al-Berqdar, a spokesman for Iraq's Supreme Judicial Council, said that Hashimi was sentenced to hang "because he was involved directly in killing a female lawyer and a general with the Iraqi army." A third charge against Hashimi was dismissed for lack of evidence. The death sentences are not final, and can be appealed within 30 days.

A political ally of Hashimi criticized the ruling, saying that the trial was not fair because Hashimi was not in Baghdad to defend himself. A lawmaker in Iraqiya, Nada al-Jbouri, criticized the timing of the sentence, which occurred as "Iraq is preparing for a big national reconciliation in the near future in order to achieve stability in this country."

Soon after the verdict was made public, a series of at least five car bombings shook mostly Shi'ite areas of the capital Baghdad, killing 32 and injuring 102 others. Iraqi sources later revised the death toll to at least 51.

== Attacks ==
Numerous attacks were conducted within hours of each other on 9 September 2012 across Baghdad and several provinces in Iraq.

- An explosion in Tal Afar killed two and injured seven others.
- An explosion at the offices of an oil company in Kirkuk killed at least 7 and injured 17 others, most of them police recruits. Earlier in the day, two car bombs and an IED blast killed seven and injured at least 40 others. Roadside blasts in the Sunni towns of Hawija and Ar Riyad nearby injured at least 7.
- A car bomb exploded next to a market in Tuz Khormato, killing four and injuring 41.
- Insurgents attacked a small Iraqi Army base near Dujail, killing at least 11 soldiers and leaving 7 others wounded.
- A roadside explosion in Taji, just north of the capital, killed 2 civilians and injured 11 others.
- Roadside bombs in Baghdad killed 2 people and injured 8 others, including four soldiers. After the death sentence to Tariq al-Hashimi was announced, a series of at least 5 car bombs exploded in mostly Shi'ite neighborhoods, targeting restaurants, cafes and commercial areas. Initial reports indicated at least 32 dead and 102 injured, although Iraqi sources later revised the death toll to at least 51.
- A pair of car bombs in Amarah killed 16 people and wounded around 100 others outside a Shi'ite shrine. After the local hospital quickly became overwhelmed, residents were forced to use the mosque's loudspeakers, usually reserved for the call to prayer, to ask for blood donations.
- A car bomb exploded near the French Consulate in Nasiriyah, killing an Iraqi policeman and injuring four passers-by. A second blast in the city killed 2 and injured 3 others.
- A bombing in Basra killed 3 and left 24 wounded.

In total, at least 108 were killed and 371 injured across the country.

== Perpetrators ==
The Islamic State of Iraq claimed responsibility for the attacks in a statement posted online, saying they were in response to the "campaign of extermination and torture of Sunni Muslim detainees in Safavid prisons". The Iraqi government executed at least 26 people in August, many of them on terrorism charges.

== Reactions ==
=== Domestic ===
- A statement by Iraq's Interior Ministry blamed al-Qaeda for the onslaught, saying "the attacks today on the markets and mosques are (intended) to provoke sectarian and political tensions," and adding that the "war against terrorism is continuing, and we are ready."

=== International ===
- The French Ministry of Foreign and European Affairs said it "condemns with the greatest severity" the wave of attacks, especially the incident outside the honorary consulate in Nasiriyah.

== See also ==
- List of terrorist incidents, July–December 2012
- Iraqi insurgency (post U.S. withdrawal)
