= 23 February 2012 Iraq attacks =

Series of bombings throughout Iraqi cities during the insurgency

- Part of Iraqi insurgency (post U.S. withdrawal)
- Location: Baghdad and at least 14 other cities, Iraq
- Date: 23 February 2012 (UTC+3)
- Attack type: Suicide bombings, car bombs, IEDs, shootings, school bombing
- Deaths: 83
- Injuries: 250+

The 23 February 2012 Iraq attacks were the fifth simultaneous wave of bombings to hit Iraq during the insurgency and the first such major assault since the US withdrawal at the end of 2011. At least 83 people were killed and more than 250 wounded in highly coordinated attacks spread out in least 15 cities - including at least 10 explosions in the capital Baghdad that left 32 people dead. A number of shootings also took place, mostly aimed at police patrols and security installations around the city. The majority of the blasts appeared to specifically target Shiite areas.

Outside Baghdad attacks were spread out, including at least three car bombs around Tikrit that killed 12 and injured more than 50. Unidentified gunmen broke into a governing council building in Salman Baik east of Tikrit, shooting dead the leader of the administration and two policemen. Car bombs exploded near a school and two police stations in Hilla, killing at least 3 and leaving scores injured. Similar attacks took place in Baqubah, Kirkuk, Taji, Dujail and Mosul.

== Perpetrators ==
The umbrella group Islamic State of Iraq claimed responsibility for the bombings two days later and promised further bloodshed as it targets Shiites across Iraq. The country was set to host the postponed Arab League Summit on March 29 in the midst of a surge of violence and a rise in civilian and security casualties since the withdrawal of US forces.

== See also ==
- Iraqi insurgency (post U.S. withdrawal)
- 5 January 2012 Iraq bombings
- 14 January 2012 Basra bombing
- 27 January 2012 Baghdad bombing
