= Albayan University =

Private university in Baghdad, Iraq

Al-Bayan University
- جامعة البيان
- Motto: صرح علمي برؤية حديثة
- Type: Private University
- Established: 2016
- Location: Baghdad, Iraq; 33.28447461°N 44.28194473°E
- Campus: Baghdad Airport Road
- Website: albayan.edu.iq
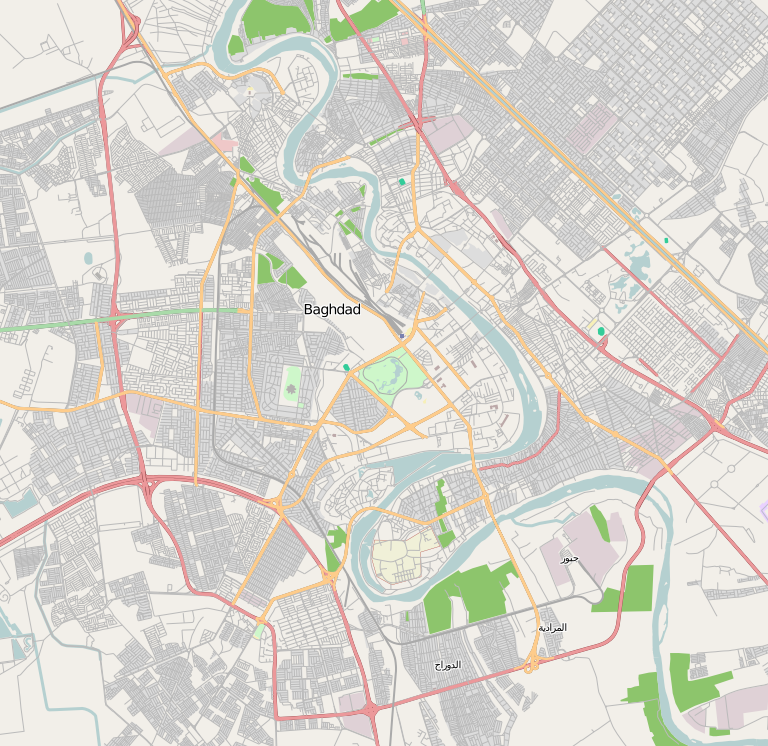
- Location in Baghdad Albayan University (Iraq)

Al-Bayan University (Arabic:جامعة البيان) is a university in Baghdad, Iraq.

== Colleges ==
- College of Dentistry
- College of Pharmacy
- College of Pathological Techniques Analysis
- College of Nursing
- College of Law
- College of Business Administrations
