= 4 December 2013 Iraq attacks =

Coordinated assaults in central and northern Iraq

December 2013 Kirkuk attack
- Part of Iraqi insurgency (post-U.S. withdrawal)
- Location: Central and Northern Iraq
- Date: 4 December 2013
- Target: Iraqi civilians Iraqi security forces (Iraqi Army, Iraqi Police); Sahwa militias
- Attack type: Car bombings, suicide bombings, roadside bombings, shootings
- Weapons: Car bombs; Suicide belts; IEDs; Automatic weapons
- Deaths: 35
- Injuries: 133
- Perpetrator: Islamic State in Iraq and the Levant

On 4 December 2013, a series of coordinated attacks took place in central and northern Iraq, with the biggest assault taking place at a government building and an adjacent shopping mall in Kirkuk. More than 30 people were killed in the attacks that day, while at least 106 were injured.

== Background ==
From a peak of 3,000 deaths per month in 2006–07, violence in Iraq decreased steadily for several years before beginning to rise again in 2012. In December 2012, Sunnis began to protest perceived mistreatment by the Shia-led government. The protests had been largely peaceful, but insurgents, emboldened by the war in neighboring Syria, stepped up attacks in the initial months of 2013. The number of attacks rose sharply after the Iraqi army raided a protest camp in Hawija on 23 April 2013. Overall, 712 people were killed in April according to UN figures, making it the nation's deadliest month in five years. Conditions continued to deteriorate in May when UNAMI reported at least 1,045 Iraqis were killed and another 2,397 wounded in acts of terrorism and acts of violence, making it the deadliest month in the country since April 2008. Similar death tolls were recorded in July and August and continued later on, as 2013 was on track to be the deadliest year for the country since 2008.

== Kirkuk attack ==
The assault in Kirkuk began when a suicide-bomber rammed his explosives-laden vehicle into the front gate of a local police intelligence building. Guards at the entrance opened fire at another bomber, who managed to detonate his suicide vest, as a firefight began with a group of six insurgents. After being repulsed by security forces, the remaining attackers, some of them wearing suicide vests, stormed the nearby Jawahir mall and took between 10 and 20 people inside hostage. Some of the militants proceeded to the roof, opening fire on Iraqi forces stationed outside and sparking another major firefight. Authorities managed to free 11 of the hostages and kill all of the attackers to end the siege. Several explosions took place during the attempt to retake the building, setting it on fire and destroying parts of it. Local police later announced that 11 people were killed in the attack, together with 8 attackers, while 54 security personnel and 52 civilians were injured in total. Footage showing the raid was released by TurkmenEli TV on YouTube.

=== Other incidents ===
Several other attacks took place around Iraq on the same day, including a separate bombing in Kirkuk that injured 4 civilians. Gunmen attacked a checkpoint in Hadhimiya, killing 3 policemen and injuring 4 others. In the former insurgent stronghold of Fallujah, a police officer was killed and another injured in a drive-by shooting, while security forces killed a militant leader and his assistant. In other shootings, two civilians were killed in Ramadi and a former police chief was gunned down in Shirqat.

In the capital Baghdad, gunmen killed a medical director near the Yarmouk hospital and a man who runs a private generator in Ghazaliya. Police forces shot and killed a suspected militant planting a bomb in the Saidiya neighborhood. In Mosul, a man was killed and his brother injured in a drive-by shooting, while an IED blast and a grenade attack elsewhere injured 3 policemen and 2 civilians. Two separate IED attacks near Haditha and Al-Qa'im killed 2 Iraqi soldiers and wounded 6 others. Bombings in Muqdadiyah and Yathrib killed a civilian and injured 6 others.

== Reactions and aftermath ==
- - The Islamic State in Iraq and the Levant took responsibility for the attack on a jihadist forum, saying that their fighters "carried out the order to invade the house of the unbelievers by raiding the headquarters of the intelligence in Kirkuk".
- United States - The United States condemned the attack saying their government is "committed in its support to the Government of Iraq in combating terrorism".
