= Baiyaa =

Al - Bayaa’ (Arabic: البياع) is a lower-middle-class neighborhood in the Al Rashid district in western Baghdad, Iraq, along the Baghdad Airport Road. Al-A'amel is to the west and Al-Saydiya to the south.

First known as Al-Bayaa City, it was named after and built by (Haj) Ali Al-Bayaa. A notable socialite, land owner and famous Iraqi businessman who, in the 1950s, envisioned a place in Iraq that could spearhead its drive towards modernity and inspire future generations to come. Today it is home to thousands of people.

Some of its most notable landmarks are:

- Street 20, which at the time of inception was renowned for its modern appearance and architecture. Today it remains an active commercial hub.
- Grid Structured Layout: Unlike other neighborhoods in the region, Al-Bayaa was built to mimic a grid structure. Much like other modern cities like New York. At the time, travelers were taken by this new form of innovative street layout.
- Ali Al-Bayaa Mosque: named after the city's founder, still serves as one of Iraq's most active places of worship. So many are usually in attendance that visitors spill over to the streets surrounding the mosque.
- The Blessed Keeper's Church: A Chaldean Christian Place of worship and congregation.

Al-Bayaa is a plural neighborhood, home to various ethnic sects of Iraqi society. Relative to other neighborhoods, it remained somewhat calm during the Iraq War, but many stores have closed and many residents from Al-Bayaa fled the neighborhood in May 2007 as violence increased throughout the country.
