= Hayy Al-A'amel =

Hayy Al-A'amel (also written as Amel or Amil) is a neighborhood (hayy) in the Al Rashid district of southwestern Baghdad, Iraq. Its northern boundary is the Baghdad Airport Road, the neighborhood of Baiyaa is to the east and Al-Jihad to the west.
