= Al-Saydiya =

Coordinates: 33.2496°N 44.3585°E

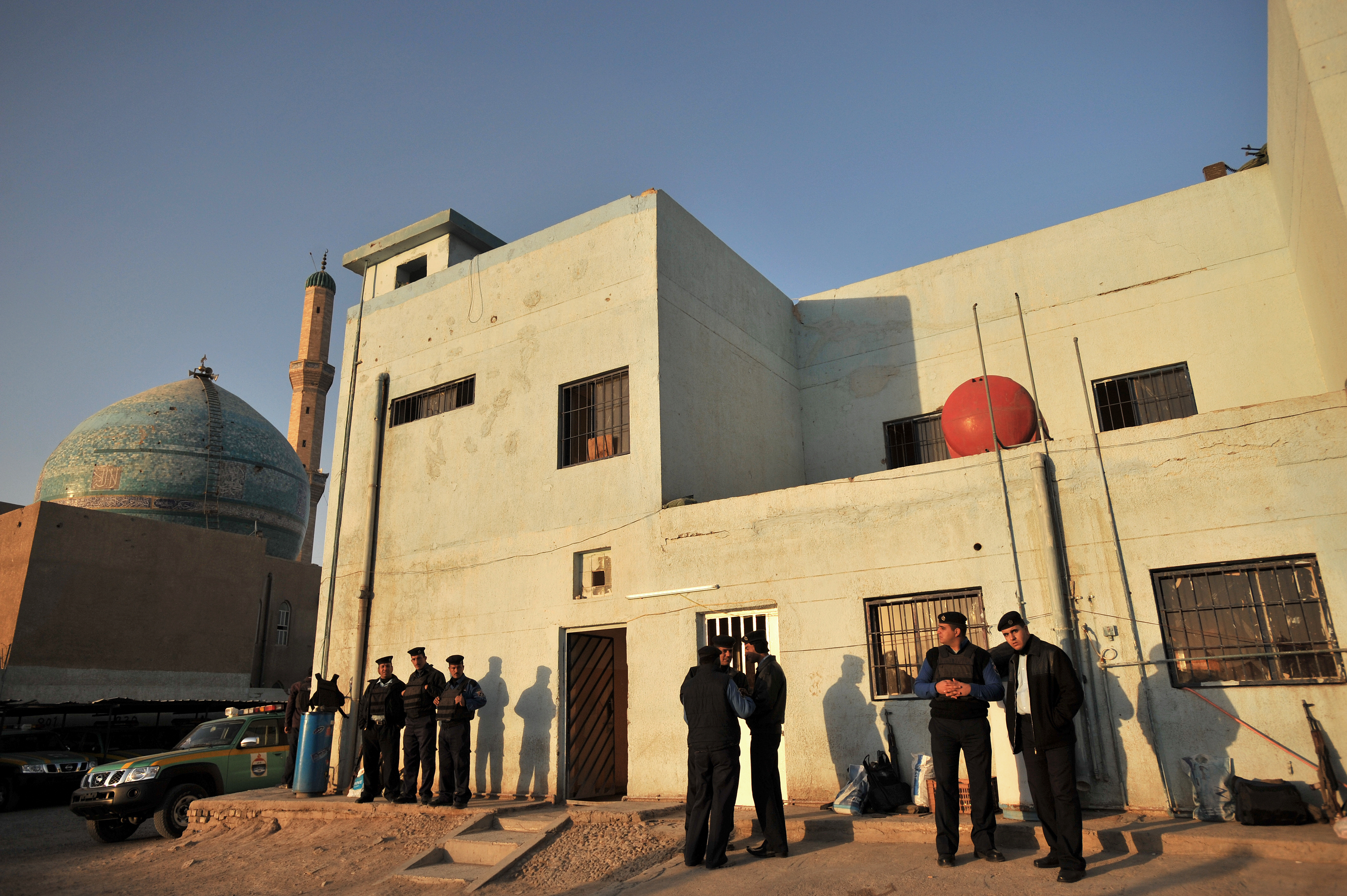

Al-Saydiya (Arabic: السيدية) is a neighborhood in the Al Rashid district of southwestern Baghdad, Iraq. Baiyaa is to the north and Dora to the east.

A once middle-class district, much of Al-Saydiya was built within the last three decades on prime real estate between Baghdad Airport Road and the main highway where it forks into central Baghdad and south to Basra.

As of 2015, Al-Saydiya remains mostly as a Muslim-Christian neighborhood, boosted by population from many Iraqi Governorates. The place has calmed down since the end of the war, and currently has many schools and mosques. The most famous school in the district is the "Al Amjad Primary School" and its intermediate level "Al-Sanaa High School For Boys" who has recently transferred their 9th Grade level to the Building where the newly founded "Al Majid High School For Boys" is. It is regarded as a very wealthy part of Baghdad. The most famous part of Al Saydiya is its very popular commercial street (Arabic: الشارع التجاري) that is split into two eastern and western parts, the street is home to many shops that sell clothes, jewelry, makeup and food. It also contains many medical clinics and some restaurants. There are also some side streets, such as Al-Khuzairan, Al Arba'in and Al Munazama.

There are 2 main parts of Al saydiya; Al Dhubat (Arabic: الضباط) and Shuhadaa Al Saydiya. The latter is located more south of Baghdad while the first is right above north.
