= 2012 Arab League summit =

Meeting of Arab regional organization

Arab League 23rd summit
- Host country: Iraq
- Dates: 27–29 March 2012
- Cities: Baghdad
- Venues: Republican Palace, Green Zone
- Chair: Nouri al-Maliki (Iraqi Prime Minister)

The 23rd Arab League Summit was the third one held in Baghdad and the first one since 1990, before the start of the Gulf War. The decision to grant the host rights to Iraq was made at the previous summit in Sirte. Among the subjects discussed were the Iraqi debts to its neighbors and the uprising in Syria. The summit marked the first time since the Invasion of Kuwait that an acting Emir (Sabah Al-Ahmad Al-Jaber Al-Sabah) paid a visit to Iraq. The summit was also notable as being the first held since the beginning of the Arab Spring, during which the governments of several member states were overthrown by popular revolutions.

== Background and preparations ==
The summit had been delayed several times due to regional unrest across the Arab world, but was scheduled to begin on March 29. The Iraqi government sent invitations to all members except Syria, who were suspended in the midst of the uprising against the Assad regime. Bahrain announced in late February that it intended to skip the summit, citing concerns with the Iraqi government as well as security issues. Later this decision was overturned and the government announced they would attend the summit.

The Iraqi government reportedly spent almost $500 million to clean up Baghdad, including new pavement for major highways, the renovation of several hotels, repainting of buildings and the complete overhaul of the former Republican Palace inside the Green Zone. By some estimates close to 3 million flowers and 500,000 trees were planted in the capital in the weeks leading to the event.

== Security concerns ==
The umbrella group Islamic State of Iraq promised to disrupt the summit as part of a new stage of "real confrontation and war against the despicable (Shiites)" in a statement released after the pan-Iraq bombings on February 23 that left 60 dead and more than 250 injured. The group repeated this threat after the 20 March 2012 Iraq attacks even though the heavy security presence in Baghdad appeared to have lowered the number of bombings within the city.

The government responded with the announcement of unprecedented security measures, including the temporary shut down of all operations at Baghdad International Airport from 26 March until the end of the summit three days later. According to Maj. Gen. Hassan al-Baydhani an estimated 26,000 security forces will guard the capital, with 4,000 reinforcements being brought from the southern and northern provinces. Most of them will be stationed near the airport, the major highways and hotels and the already heavily fortified Green Zone.

The influential Shiite leader Muqtada al-Sadr banned his followers from staging any demonstrations during the summit. Thousands of people attended earlier marches against the Saudi intervention in Bahrain's uprising and it is feared that such scenes will embarrass the Iraqi government as well as guests at the conference.

The heavy security preparations appeared to have paid off, as there was a single suicide attack in Baghdad on March 27 that left one person dead and four injured. Two days later three rockets were fired towards the Green Zone as foreign dignitaries and nine heads of state were preparing for discussions inside the Republican Palace. One of the missiles landed near the Iranian embassy, breaking windows, but inflicting no casualties.

== Attendance ==
=== Arab League representatives ===
- Algeria - low-level delegation
- Bahrain - low-level delegation
- Comoros - President Ikililou Dhoinine
- Djibouti - President Ismaïl Omar Guelleh
- Egypt - low-level delegation
- Iraq - Prime Minister Nouri al-Maliki & President Jalal Talabani
- Jordan - low-level delegation
- Kuwait - Sheikh Sabah Al-Ahmad Al-Jaber Al-Sabah
- Lebanon - President Michel Sulaiman
- Libya - Chairman Mustafa Abdul Jalil
- Mauritania - President Mohamed Ould Abdel Aziz
- Morocco - low-level delegation
- Oman - low-level delegation
- State of Palestine - President of the PNA Mahmoud Abbas
- Qatar - low-level delegation
- Saudi Arabia - Ambassador to the Arab League & Egypt Ahmed Qatan
- Somalia - President Sharif Sheikh Ahmed
- Sudan - President Omar al-Bashir
- Tunisia - President Moncef Marzouki
- United Arab Emirates - low-level delegation
- Yemen - low-level delegation

=== Other participants ===
- (African Union) United Nations \ Arab League Special Envoy on Syria - Kofi Annan
- Arab League - Secretary-General Nabil Elaraby
- United Nations - Secretary-General Ban Ki-moon
