= Hay Al-Sihah =

Hay Al-Sihah is a district that lies to the south of Dora, Baghdad Section, north of Abo-Dsheer and to the south of the highway that connects Al-Saidiya with Baghdad Al-Jadida (New Baghdad). Hay Al-Sihah means the Health District. It was given this name from a government housing program designed to house health department employees in the district. This program stopped in the mid-2000s and properties were sold to all the citizens living in Baghdad in public auctions.

== Regions and Zones ==
Sihah District contains three main parts:

- Beyout (Residence) is the part of Sihah that forms the line between Share' 60 (street 60) from the east and the 'Emarat from the west and between the highway from the north to Abo-Dsheer to the south contains approximately more than 1000 residences and the most famous street in this part is El-Share' El-'Areeth (or the wide street, which is about 40m wide) which divides the part into two major areas, and it is used to inform the people where do you live only, after the war and specifically at 2007 this street used to distinguish the citizens to the Shia and Sunnah and after a while that distinguish has been disappeared.
- 'Emarat (Buildings Compounds), which is the second main part of the district and lies to the west of the residence area and to part of the highway that connects Baghdad to Karbala and Hilla to the east it is a well known part of Baghdad to the resident people in Baghdad and most of the resident citizens there are Arab citizens mostly from Palestine and Sudan.
- AL-Kafa'at (Residence) is the most recent part of the district lies to the north of the compound, it was distributed to the Competent Officers in the ex-Iraqi Army, but it have been randomly built and lost its original map.

== After 2003 ==
Hay Al-Sihah is part of Dora, Baghdad, which has the largest composition of population in Baghdad.
