= 2010 Arab League summit =

Meeting of Arab regional organization

Arab League 22nd summit
- Arab League Summit Emblem
- Host country: Libya
- Dates: 27 March 2010
- Cities: Sirte
- Chair: Muammar Gaddafi
- Follows: 2009 Arab League summit
- Precedes: 2012 Arab League summit

The Arab League 22nd Summit was held in Sirte, Libya on 27 March 2010.

Then-Italian Prime minister Silvio Berlusconi spoke at the summit, stressing that Israel should return the Golan Heights to Syria.

Palestinian President Mahmoud Abbas rejected pressure from Syria and Libya to quit the peace process. His senior aide Nabil Abu Rudeineh said: "We are ready for any Arab option. If they want to go to war let them declare that and mobilize their armies and their people and we will follow suit".

== Participating leaders ==
Member states of the Arab League

- (Algeria) Algerian President Abdelaziz Bouteflika
- Abdullah bin Hamad bin Isa Al Khalifa of Bahrain
- (Comoros) Comorian President Ahmed Abdallah Mohamed Sambi
- (Djibouti) Djiboutian President Ismaïl Omar Guelleh
- (Egypt) Egyptian Foreign Minister Ahmed Aboul Gheit
- (Iraq) Iraqi Foreign Minister Hoshyar Zebari
- King Abdullah II of Jordan
- Sheikh Sabah Al-Ahmad Al-Jaber Al-Sabah of Kuwait
- (Lebanon) Lebanese Acting Foreign Minister Tarek Mitri.
- (Libya) Libyan Leader Muammar Gaddafi (host)
- (Mauritania) Mauritanian President Mohamed Ould Abdel Aziz
- Moulay Rachid of Morocco
- (Oman) Omani Deputy Prime Minister Fahd bin Mahmoud al Said
- (Palestine) Palestinian President Mahmoud Abbas
- Sheikh Hamad bin Khalifa Al Thani of Qatar
- (Saudi Arabia) Saudi Foreign Minister Saud bin Faisal Al Saud
- (Somalia) Somali President Sharif Sheikh Ahmed
- (Sudan) Sudanese President Omar Al-Bashir
- (Syria) Syrian President Bashar al-Assad
- (Tunisia) Tunisian President Zine El Abidine Ben Ali
- Sheikh Saud bin Rashid Al Mualla Ruler of Umm Al Quwain of the United Arab Emirates
- (Yemen) Yemeni President Ali Abdullah Saleh

Non-member states of the Arab League

- (Italy) Italian Prime Minister Silvio Berlusconi
- (Turkey) Turkish Prime Minister Recep Tayyip Erdoğan

International organizations

- Arab League Secretary-General Amr Moussa
- Chair of the African Union Commission Jean Ping
- (United Nations) UN Secretary-General Ban Ki-moon
