= Al-Rashid, Baghdad =

Coordinates: 33.2833°N 44.4667°E

Al Rasheed اَلرَّشِيْد Al Rashid
- District
- Location in Baghdad
- Country: Iraq
- Governorate: Baghdad
- City: Baghdad

Al Rasheed or Al Rashid (Arabic: اَلرَّشِيْد) is one of the nine administrative districts in Baghdad, Iraq. It is in southern Baghdad, on the western side of the Tigris River. Mansour district is to the north of the western half of the district, on the other side of the Baghdad Airport Road.

Neighborhoods in Al Rasheed include Hayy Al-A'amel (Amel or Amil), Baiyaa, Dora, Al-Jihad, Al-Saydiya and Hayy Al-Shurtta.

== See also ==
- List of places in Iraq
- List of neighborhoods and districts in Baghdad
