= September 2013 Samarra attacks =

Terrorist incident in Iraq

Samarra attacks
- Part of Iraqi insurgency (2011–2013)
- Location: Samarra, Iraq
- Date: 20 September 2013
- Target: Sunni civilians
- Weapon: Bombs
- Deaths: 25
- Injuries: 39

The September 2013 Samarra attacks were a series of coordinated bombings and shootings across central and southern parts of Iraq that resulted in at least 25 people killed and injured 39 other. Samarra, a mostly Sunni Arab city, is 100 kilometers (62 miles) north of Baghdad.

The attack happened as worshippers entered the mosque around midday for Friday prayers. The biggest attack took place in Samarra, where a bomb hidden in the air-conditioning unit of a Sunni mosque was detonated, killing 18 and injuring 21 others.

== Attacks ==
-In May 2013, a car bomb exploded in Samarra near a military base (Federal Police headquarters) that killed 3 and left 13 wounded.

-In July 2013, 7 were killed and 9 wounded after an explosion occurred in Alhaq Square, before Friday prayer, near the Al-Razzaq Mosque. Reports said the suicide bomber wore an army uniform.

- August 2013, a car bomb exploded was parked inside Samraa grocery market at a time where shoppers took advantage of reduced prices on surplus stock before closing. At least 16 were killed and 26 wounded.

-October 2013, a car bomb exploded near in a commercial street in Samarra, more than 12 people were killed including women and children.

-In December 2013, Three Pakistani pilgrims were killed in a gun attack on a bus carried pilgrims.
