= Main supply route =

Military or humanitarian logistics passageway

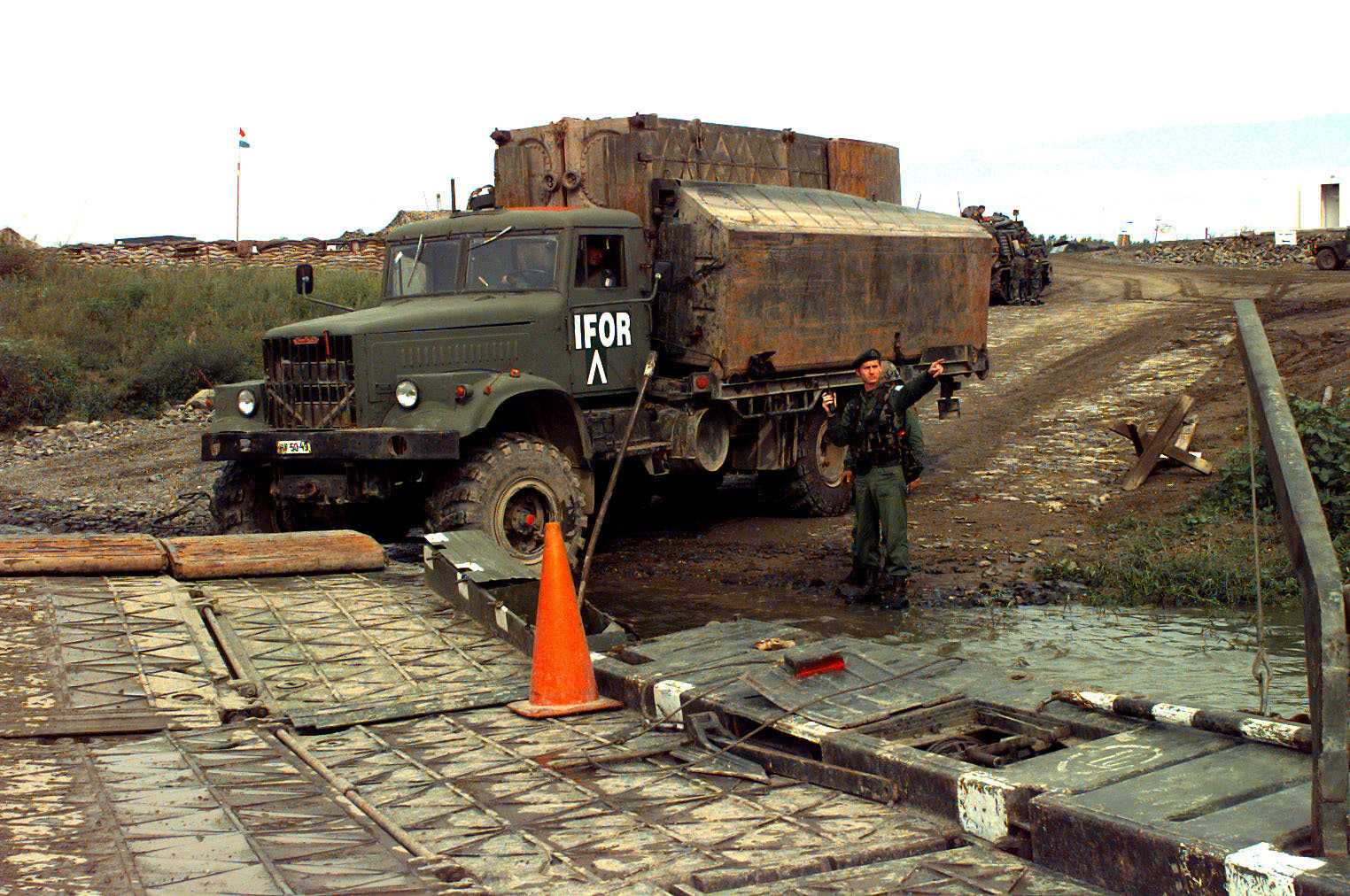
A Hungarian Army truck on an MSR crossing the Sava river at Slavonski Brod, Croatia.

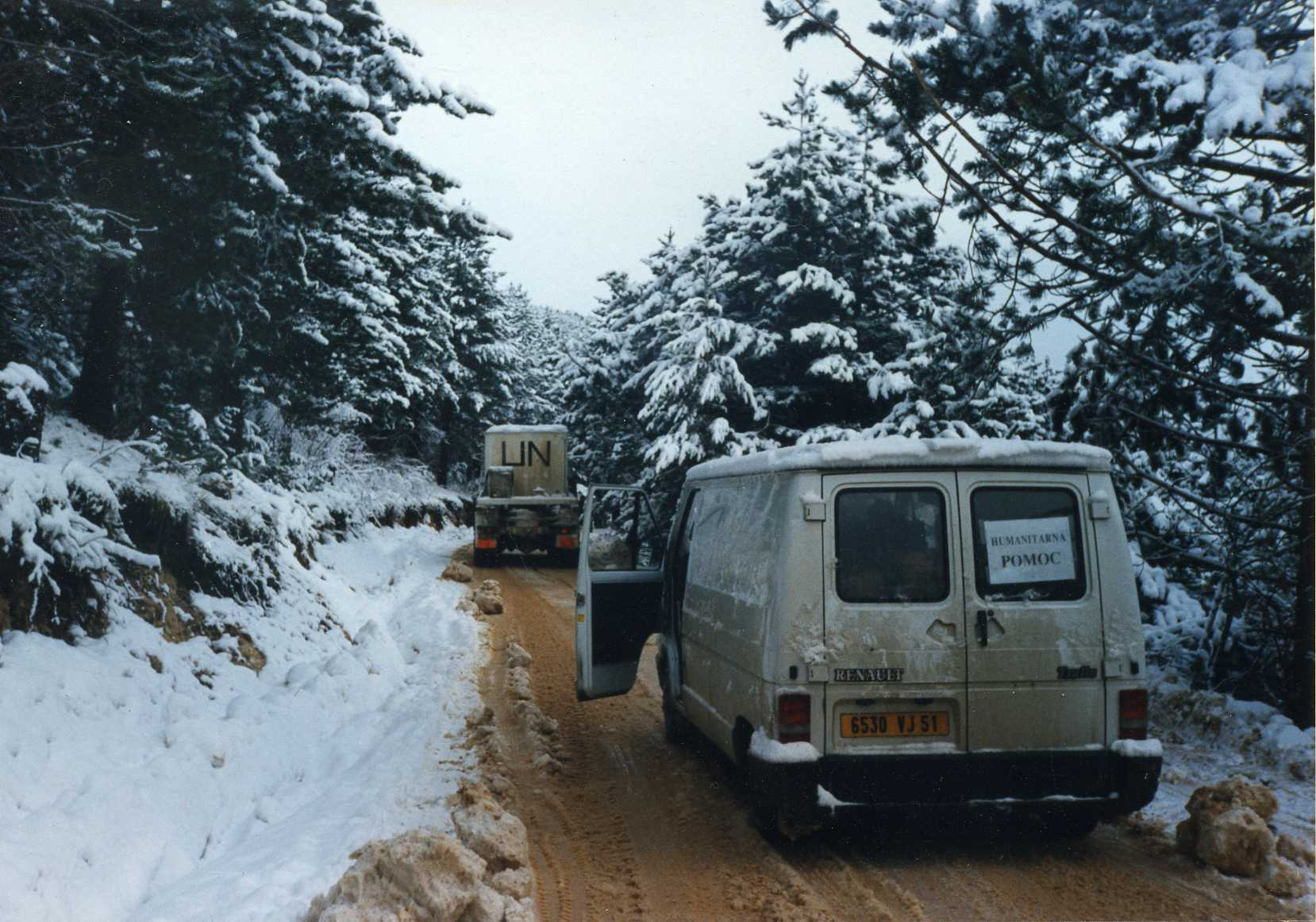
The infamous Route Diamond MSR, routing UNHCR aid into central Bosnia in the winter of 1993.

A main supply route (MSR) is the route or routes designated within an area of operations upon which the bulk of traffic flows in support of military operations and humanitarian operations. MSR is a term that is also used in insurgency and irregular war scenarios.

Because of the intense and predictable flow of constrained military traffic MSRs can often become targets for opposing forces, as was the case with the Airport Road in Baghdad, a short but dangerous route.

== See also ==
- Line of communication
- Military logistics
- Humanitarian Logistics
