= Raghiba Khatoun =

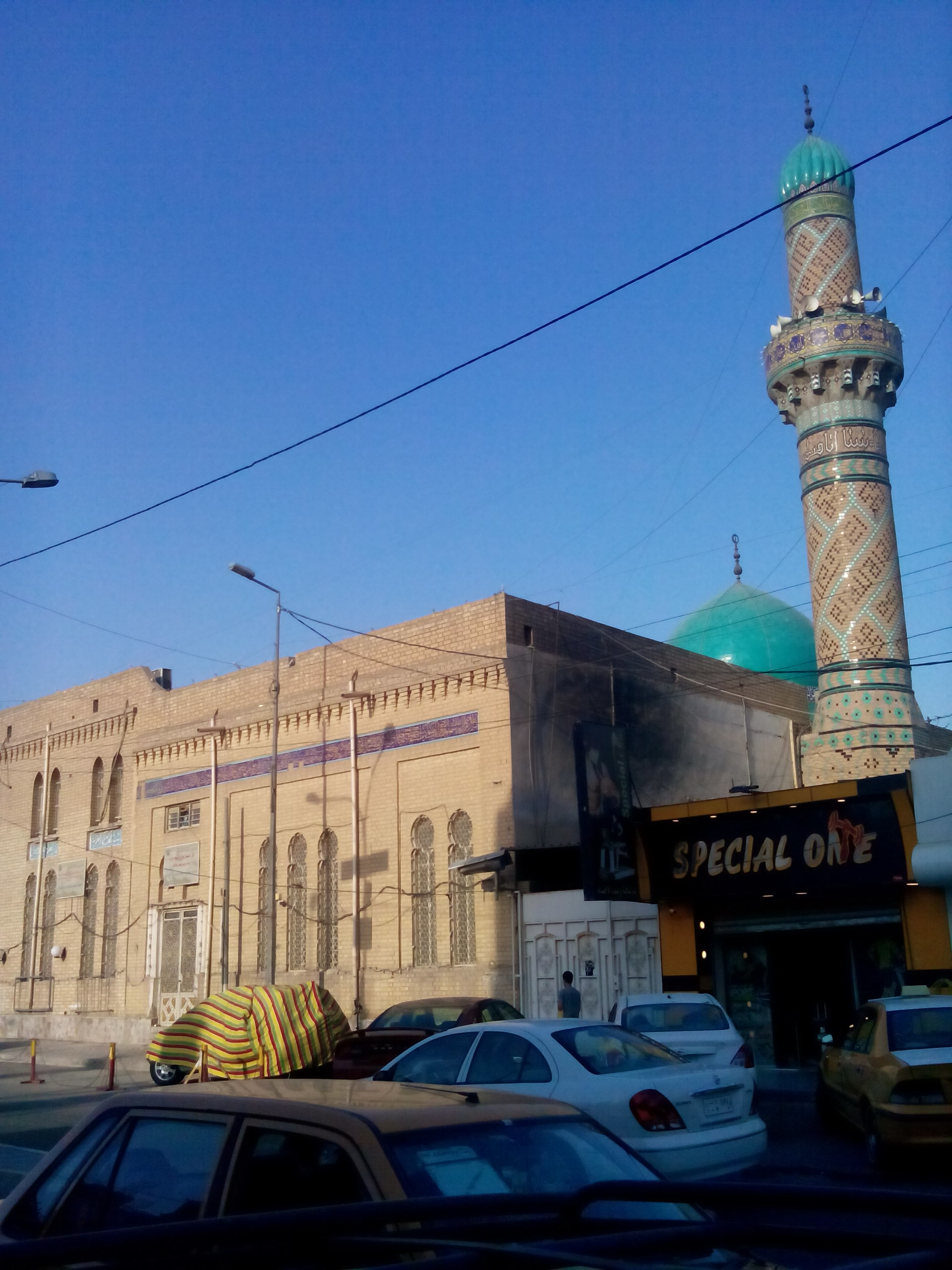

Raghiba Khatoun is a neighbourhood of Baghdad, Iraq.
