= Al-Jihad (Baghdad) =

Neighborhood in Iraq

Coordinates: 33°17′N 44°17′E

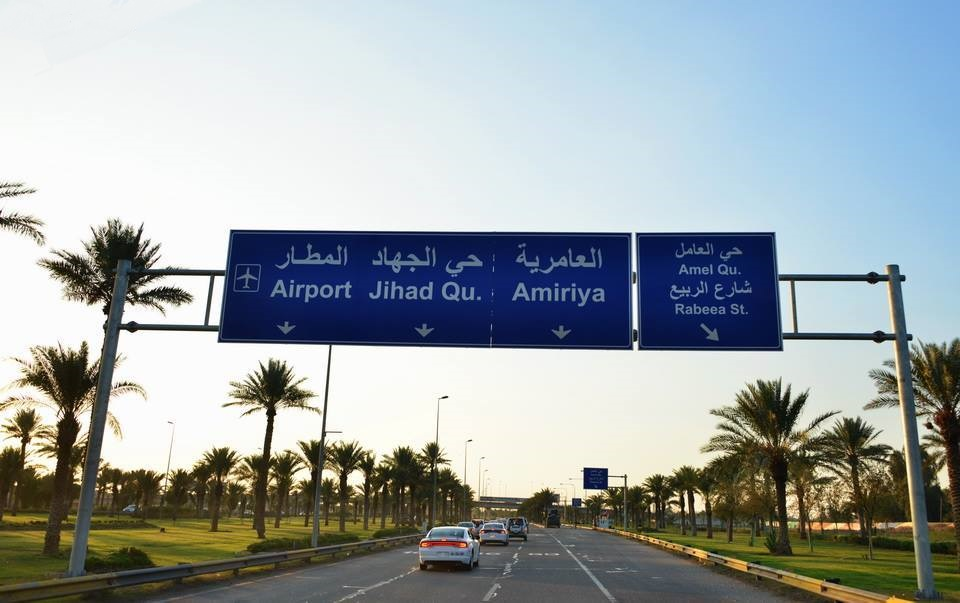

Jihad (Arabic: حي الجهاد; Al-Jihad or Hayy Al-Jihad) is a neighborhood (hayy) in the Al Rashid district in western Baghdad, Iraq. To the north is Al-A'amiriya (Amiriya) on the other side of Baghdad Airport Road, and to the east is Al-A'amel.

The New York Times has said, "a former slice of mixed middle-class calm in the heart of western Baghdad, Jihad fell to Sunni insurgents after the American invasion. Flowing in from neighboring Amiriya to streets dominated by former Baathist intelligence officers, the extremist groups shot and killed barbers, government officials and businessmen and dumped their bodies in the streets for all to see."

Since 2006 the Shia Mahdi Army has gradually seized control.
