= 13 June 2012 Iraq attacks =

Bombings and shootings in Iraq during the post-U.S. insurgency

- Part of Iraqi insurgency (post U.S. withdrawal)
- Location: Baghdad, Kirkuk, Taji, Hilla, Mosul, Karbala and Balad
- Date: 13 June 2012; UTC+3
- Target: Security forces, Shia pilgrims
- Attack type: Suicide car bombings, shootings
- Deaths: 93
- Injuries: 312

The 13 June 2012 Iraq attacks were a series of simultaneous bombings and shootings that killed 93 people and wounded over 300 others. The attacks were carried out in seven different locations throughout Iraq.

== Background ==
Extra security had been put in place to cope with the large crowds of pilgrims expected in Baghdad. Two days before the attacks, six people were killed and almost 40 injured in a mortar attack near the Moussa al-Kadhim shrine.

== Attacks ==
Most of the attacks were car bombings and appeared to be aimed primarily at Shi'ite pilgrims gathered to commemorate the death of imam Moussa al-Kadhim. The first car bomb, aimed at a group of pilgrims, exploded in Taji, a town north of Baghdad. It was followed by four blasts across Baghdad. According to an eyewitness, the bombs were aimed at pilgrims but also killed people working in the area. In all, ten blasts were reported across the Baghdad area.

Two bombs in Hilla appear to have been aimed at security forces. The perpetrators targeted a restaurant frequented by police, killing 22 people and leaving 38 wounded. According to eyewitness reports, the car bomb was detonated right as a minibus full of police officers pulled up to the restaurant. "It's heart-breaking. It's just sirens, and screams of wounded people," remarked an eyewitness.

In Kirkuk three bombs exploded, with one targeting the headquarters of Kurdish President Massoud Barzani. A civilian was killed in that explosion. Two car bombs exploded near simultaneously in Balad, north of the capital, killing seven pilgrims and injuring 34 others. Bombings were also reported in Mosul and Karbala. Three federal policemen were shot dead by unidentified gunmen in the Baghdad's Saidyiah district.

== Perpetrators ==
There were no immediate claims of responsibility for the bombings. However, reports suggested the participation of the Islamic State of Iraq, as the attacks mostly appeared to target Shi'ite pilgrims.

== Reactions ==
=== Domestic ===
The speaker for the Iraqi parliament Usama al-Nujayfi called the attacks a "move to provoke sectarian strife". Dhia al-Wakeel, the Baghdad military command spokesperson, said that while the attacks are intended to initiate clashes between sects, "Iraqis are fully aware of the terrorism agenda and will not slip into a sectarian conflict".

Abdul-Sataar al-Jumaili, of the Sunni-majority political bloc Iraqiya, was quoted by journalists as saying that the "violent acts reflect the depth of the political crisis in the country and the escalation of political differences among blocks".

=== International ===
- United Nations – The head of the United Nations Assistance Mission in Iraq (UNAMI) and United Nations Secretary-General Ban Ki-moon's Special Representative for Iraq Martin Kobler expressed his shock at the attacks and appealed to the government "to address the root causes of the violence and terrorism that are causing so much suffering and pain to the Iraqi people". UNAMI released a statement, warning that the current political stalemate in the country is "diverting attention from pressing economic, social and security issues".
- Russia – Russia's Foreign Ministry issued a statement condemning the attacks saying that "Among their victims are peaceful civilians, including women and children".
- United Kingdom – The British Minister for the Middle East, Alistair Burt, said "I was appalled to hear of the bombings across Iraq today which mainly targeted Shia pilgrims in Baghdad and elsewhere. I strongly condemn these cowardly attacks and offer my deepest condolences to the families of those who lost their lives and those who were injured. I urge all political blocs in Iraq to work together and focus on bringing security and stability to all of Iraq."
- United States – The U.S. Embassy in Baghdad issued a statement condemning the attacks and that "the perpetrators of these cowardly terrorist attacks must be brought to justice and we will support Iraq's Security Forces in this effort in any way we can."
