= Hayy Al-Shurtta =

Neighborhood in Baghdad, Iraq

Hayy Al-Shurtta is a neighborhood in the southwestern part of the Al Rashid district of Baghdad, Iraq.
