= Iraqi insurgency (2011–2013) =

2011–13 sectarian violence in Iraq following the US invasion and withdrawal

- Part of the Iraqi conflict
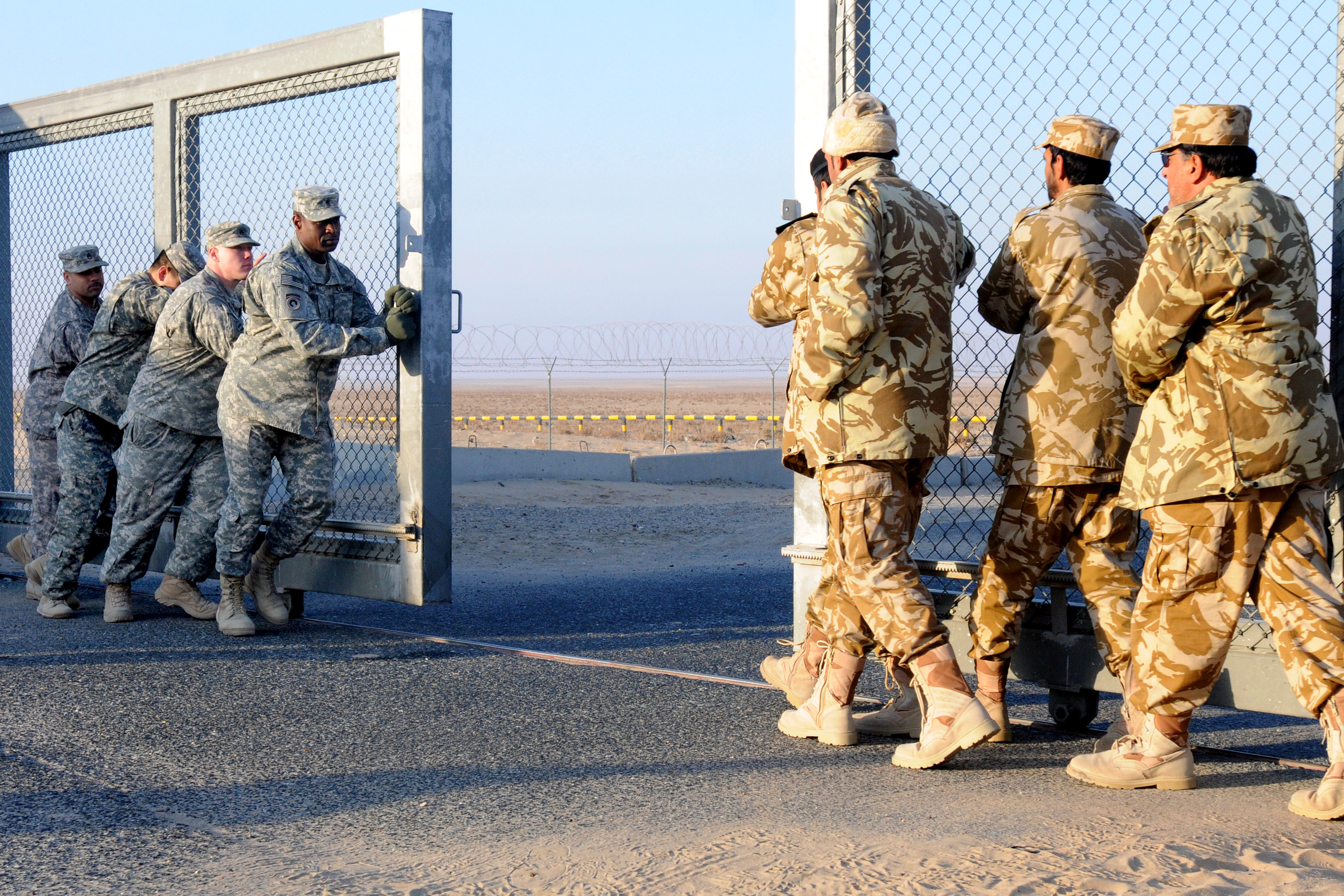
- U.S. and Kuwaiti troops unite to close the gate between Kuwait and Iraq after the last military convoy passed through on Dec. 18, 2011, signaling the end of Operation New Dawn and the beginning of the post-U.S. phase of the insurgency
Date	18 December 2011 – 30 December 2013 (2 years, 1 week and 5 days)
Location	Iraq (mostly central and northern, including Baghdad)
Result	Escalation of the insurgency, beginning of the War in Iraq (2013–2017): Significant increase in violence since the U.S. withdrawal, with an increasing number of insurgent large-scale attacks and assaults; Resurgence of ISI, later transforming to ISIL

Belligerents
(Iraq) Iraqi Government: Security forces; Private security contractors; Iraqi Kurdistan: Peshmerga; Asayish; CTG Kurdistan; Parastin u Zanyari; (Iraq) Sons of Iraq; Supported by: United States	Islamic State of Iraq (ISIL since April 2013) Islamic Army in Iraq; Naqshbandi Army; Other Sunni insurgents

Commanders and leaders
(Iraq) Nouri al-Maliki (Iraq) Jalal Talabani (Iraq) Babaker Zebari (Iraq) Ahmed Abu Risha (Kurdistan Region) Masoud Barzani	(Islamic State) Abu Bakr al-Baghdadi (Islamic State) Abu Mohammad al-Adnani Ishmael Jubouri (Iraq) Izzat Ibrahim al-Douri

Strength
Iraqi Security Forces; 600,000 (300,000 Army and 300,000 Police); Awakening Council militias – 30,000; Contractors ~7,000	Supreme Command for Jihad and Liberation: 2,000–3,000; Islamic Army in Iraq: 10,400 (2007) Al-Qaeda: 1,000–2,000; JRTN: 1,500-5,000

Casualties and losses
1,156 policemen and 949 soldiers killed 2,286 policemen and 1,759 soldiers wounded	919+ insurgents killed, 3,504 arrested
- 6,746 civilians killed and 10,511 wounded; 9,770 people killed in total (Government figures, December 2011 – December 2013); 14,855 civilians killed (Iraq body count figures, December 2011 – December 2013)

The Iraqi insurgency was an insurgency that began in late 2011 after the end of the Iraq War and the withdrawal of U.S. troops from Iraq, resulting in violent conflict with the central government, as well as low-level sectarian violence among Iraq's religious groups.

The insurgency was a direct continuation of events following the U.S.-led invasion of Iraq in 2003. Sunni militant groups stepped up attacks targeting the country's majority Shia population to undermine confidence in the Shia-led government and its efforts to protect people without coalition assistance. Many Sunni factions stood against the Syrian government, which Shia groups moved to support, and numerous members of both sects also crossed the border to fight in Syria.

In 2014, the insurgency escalated dramatically following the conquest of Mosul and major areas in northern Iraq by the Islamic State in Iraq and Syria (ISIS), a Salafi jihadist militant group and unrecognised proto-state that follows a fundamentalist, Qutbi-Wahhabi doctrine of Sunni Islam. ISIL gained global prominence in early 2014 when it drove Iraqi government forces out of key cities in its Western Iraq offensive, followed by its capture of Mosul and the Sinjar massacre, thereby merging the new conflict with the Syrian Civil War, into a new, far deadlier conflict.

== Background ==
The Iraq War (Note: The conflict is also known as the War in Iraq, the Occupation of Iraq, the Second Gulf War, Gulf War II, and Gulf War 2. The period of the war lasting from 2003 to 2010 was referred to as Operation Iraqi Freedom by the United States military.) was a protracted armed conflict that began with the U.S.-led invasion of Iraq in 2003, which toppled the government of Saddam Hussein. However, the war continued for much of the next decade as an insurgency emerged to oppose the occupying forces and the post-invasion Iraqi government. The United States officially withdrew its troops from Iraq in 2011, but the insurgency and various dimensions of the civil armed conflict continued.

The invasion began in 2003 when the United States, joined by the United Kingdom and several coalition allies, launched a "shock and awe" surprise attack without declaring war. Iraqi forces were quickly overwhelmed as U.S. forces swept throughout the country. The invasion led to the collapse of the Ba'athist government; Saddam was captured, and he was executed by a military court three years later. However, the power vacuum following Saddam's fall, the mismanagement of the occupation and the sectarian policies of various militias led to a lengthy insurgency against U.S., coalition forces and Iraqi government forces as well as widespread sectarian violence between Shias and Sunnis. The United States responded with a troop surge in 2007; the heavy American security presence and deals made between the occupying forces and Sunni militias reduced the level of violence. The U.S. began withdrawing its troops in the winter of 2007–2008. The winding down of U.S. involvement in Iraq accelerated under President Barack Obama. The U.S. withdrew all combat troops from Iraq by 2011.

The Bush administration based its rationale for war principally on the assertion that Iraq possessed weapons of mass destruction (WMDs) and that Saddam's government posed an immediate threat to the United States and its coalition allies. Some U.S. officials accused Saddam of harboring and supporting al-Qaeda, while others cited the desire to end a repressive dictatorship and bring democracy to the people of Iraq. After the invasion, however, no evidence was found to verify the initial claims about WMDs. The rationale and misrepresentation of pre-war intelligence faced heavy criticism within the U.S. and internationally.

As a result of the war, Iraq held its multi-party elections in 2005, and Nouri al-Maliki later became Prime Minister the following year. The Maliki government enacted policies that were widely seen as having the effect of alienating the country's Sunni minority, which worsened sectarian tensions. In 2014, ISIS launched a military offensive in Northern Iraq and later declared a worldwide Islamic caliphate, eliciting another military response from the United States and its allies. The Iraq War caused hundreds of thousands of civilian and military casualties (see estimates). The majority of the casualties occurred as a result of the insurgency and civil conflicts between 2004 and 2007.

== Timeline ==
=== 2011 ===
As previously planned, the last US combat troops were withdrawn from Iraq in 2011, with security responsibility in the hands of the Iraqi Armed Forces. On 15 December, martial closing ceremony was held in Baghdad putting a formal end to the U.S. mission in Iraq. This ceased direct U.S. combat involvement in the war. The last 500 soldiers left Iraq under cover of darkness and under strict secrecy early on the morning of 18 December 2011, ending the U.S. military presence in Iraq after nearly nine years. On 22 December 2011 at least 72 civilians were killed and more than 170 wounded in a series of bombings across Baghdad, while nine others died in various attacks in Baqubah, Mosul and Kirkuk.

=== 2012 ===
- January 2012 Iraq attacks:
  - On 5 January, suicide bombings took place in Baghdad and Nasiriyah, killing 73 and leaving 149 injured. The bombing in the southern Iraqi city was targeted at crowds of Shi'ite Muslims and killed at least 44, injuring more than 80 others. It was the first major attack in Nasiriyah since a suicide attack against an Italian army base killed 28 in November 2003, including 19 Italians. ISIS claimed responsibility.
  - On 14 January, a suicide bomber detonated his explosives amid a crowd of Shi'ite pilgrims in Basra, killing 53 and injuring 141. This was the deadliest attack in the city since car bombs in April 2004 killed at least 74.
  - On 27 January, a suicide bomber attacked a funeral procession in Baghdad's Zaafaraniyah district, killing 32 and injuring more than 70 others.
- 23 February: A series of attacks across 15 Iraqi cities left 83 killed and more than 250 injured. ISIS claimed responsibility two days later.
- 5 March: A gang of gunmen disguised in military-style uniforms and carrying forged arrest warrants killed 27 police and then hoisted the battle flag of ISI in a carefully planned early morning attack in Anbar Governorate.
- 20 March: A wave of attacks centered on Baghdad and Kerbala killed at least 52 and left more than 250 injured. ISIS claimed responsibility.
- 19 April: More than 20 bombs exploded across Iraq, killing at least 36 people and wounding almost 170. ISIS claimed responsibility.
- 4 June: A suicide bomber killed 26 people and wounded almost 200 at the offices of a Shiite foundation in Baghdad, sparking fears of sectarian strife at a time of political crisis. The attack in the center of the capital was followed later by an explosion near a Sunni religious foundation, causing no casualties.
- 13 June: At least 93 people were killed and over 300 wounded in a series of highly coordinated attacks across Iraq. ISIS claimed responsibility.

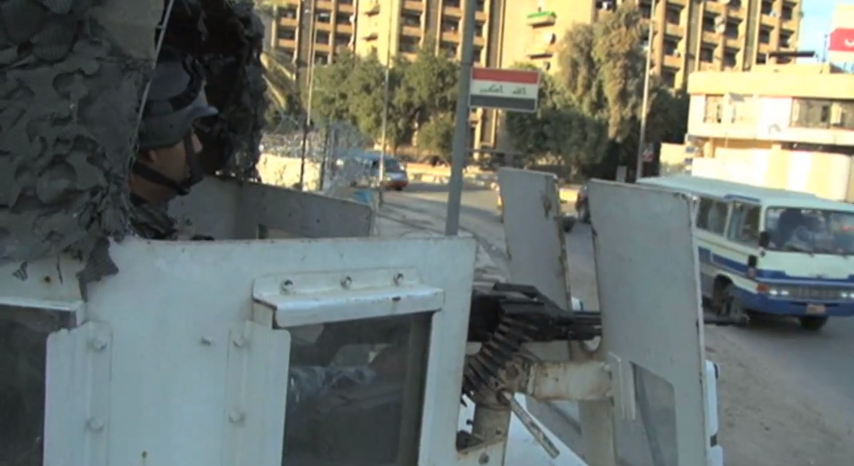
Iraqi soldiers in Baghdad, 26 December 2011

- 3 July: Explosions in Diwaniyah, Karbala, Taji and Tuz Khormato killed 40 and injured 122 others.
- 22 July: Car bombs killed 23 and wounded 74 in Baghdad, Mahmoudiyah and Najaf.
- 23 July: Coordinated attacks across Iraq killed 116 and left 299 injured. ISIS claimed responsibility.
- 31 July: Attacks across Iraq killed 24 and injured 61, most of them in twin car bombings in Baghdad.
- 13 August: At least 128 people were killed and more than 400 wounded in coordinated attacks across Iraq, making them the deadliest attacks in the country since October 2009, when 155 were killed in twin bombings near the Justice Ministry in Baghdad.
- 9 September: A wave of attacks across the country killed at least 108 and left more than 370 others injured.
- 30 September: A string of attacks occur in at least 10 Iraqi cities, killing 37 and injuring more than 90 others, most of them civilians.
- 27 October: A wave of attacks during the Eid al-Adha holiday across Iraq killed at least 46 and left 123 injured. Most incidents occurred in Baghdad, Taji, Mosul and Muqdadiya.
- 28 October: A car bombing during the last day of Eid left 15 people dead and 33 injured in Baghdad.
- 6 November: A car bombing outside an army base in Taji killed 31 people and injured at least 50 others, most of them soldiers. The blast struck as troops were leaving the base and potential recruits were lining up for job interviews.
- 14 November: Insurgents staged a number of attacks on the eve of the Islamic New Year, killing 29 and injuring at least 194 others. The deadliest incidents took place in Kirkuk and Hilla, where at least seven bombings killed 19 and left 129 wounded. Other attacks took place in Baghdad, Mosul, Kut, Fallujah and Baqubah.
- 27 November: At least 29 people are killed and 126 wounded in eight car bombings across Iraq.

==== Sunni protests (2012) ====
After a period of calm, renewed political tension within Iraq led to renewed protests, this time mostly centered around the country's Sunni minority. The main cause for upheaval was the ongoing standoff between Vice President Tareq al-Hashemi and Prime Minister al-Maliki, but strained relationships with the Kurdish autonomous regions added to the scene. On December 23, 2012, several thousand Iraqis marched against al-Maliki, responding to his moves against al-Hashemi and other influential Sunni leaders.

=== 2013 ===
On 4 January, a car bombing in Musayyib killed 28 Shi'ite pilgrims and injured 60 others as they were returning from Karbala. In mid-January, a suicide bomber killed a prominent Sunni MP and six others in Fallujah, two days after Finance Minister Rafi al-Issawi survived an assassination attempt in the same city. The parliamentarian, Ayfan Sadoun al-Essawi, was an important member of the Sons of Iraq committee in Fallujah and part of the opposition to Prime Minister Nouri al-Maliki. A suicide truck-bomber also attacked the headquarters of the Kurdistan Democratic Party in Kirkuk, killing 26 and leaving 204 injured. A similar attack against another Kurdish office in Tuz Khormato killed 5 and wounded 40. Later that month, a suicide bomber blew himself up during a funeral for a politician's relative in the city of Tuz Khormato, killing 42 and leaving 75 others wounded. In addition, protests by Sunni Muslims in Iraq against the government of Prime Minister Nouri al-Maliki turned deadly in Fallujah, as soldiers opened fire on a crowd of rock-throwing demonstrators, killing 7 and injuring more than 70 others. Three soldiers were later shot to death in retaliation for the incident, and clashes erupted in Askari, on the eastern outskirts of Fallujah. Security forces were placed on high alert as a curfew and vehicle ban were brought into effect. In a statement, Maliki urged both sides to show restraint and blamed the incident on unruly protesters. He also warned that it could lead to a "rise in tension that al-Qaida and terrorist groups are trying to take advantage of".

In February, a suicide car-bomber detonated his vehicle near the provincial police headquarters in Kirkuk, killing at least 36 and injuring 105 others. Among the wounded was Major General Jamal Tahir, the city's chief of police, who had survived a previous attack at almost the same spot two years earlier. Three additional attackers were killed after the initial blast, as they attempted to throw grenades at security forces. Several officers who survived the attack reported that the first bomber was driving a police car and wearing a uniform. When guards at the gate stopped him to check his credentials, he detonated his explosives.

In early March, unidentified gunmen ambushed a Syrian Army convoy escorted by Iraqi soldiers in the Battle of Akashat, killing 48 Syrians and 13 Iraqis. The assault took place near the desert border between the two nations in Iraq's Al Anbar Governorate. Authorities suspected the Free Iraqi Army, Jabhat al-Nusra, or al-Qaeda in Iraq of being behind the attack. A week later, ISIS claimed responsibility for the attack, stating that they had "annihilated" a "column of the Safavid army," a reference to the Shia Persian dynasty that ruled Iran from 1501 to 1736. The group also claimed that the presence of Syrian soldiers in Iraq showed "firm co-operation" between the Syrian and Iraqi governments. In mid-March, a series of coordinated attacks across the capital Baghdad and several major cities in the north and central parts of the country killed at least 98 people and left 240 others injured. The wave of violence was directed mostly at Shia civilians and took place on the tenth anniversary of the beginning of the Iraq War. ISIS later claimed responsibility for the attacks.

In April, a tanker bomb exploded at the police headquarters in Tikrit, killing at least 42 people and injuring 67 others. Insurgents attacked an oil field near Akaz in a remote part of Al Anbar Governorate, killing 2 engineers and kidnapping a third one. Other attacks across the country left a prison warden in Mosul dead and 11 others injured, including the mayor of Tuz Khormato and at least four journalists, who were stabbed by unknown assailants in a series of attacks on media offices in the capital Baghdad. Five days later, a suicide bomber killed 22 and injured 55 at a political rally for a local Sunni candidate in Baqubah. On April 23, Iraqi Army units moved against an encampment set up by protesters in Hawija, west of the city of Kirkuk, sparking deadly clashes and reprisal attacks across the country. According to army officers, the operation was aimed at Sunni militants from the Naqshbandi Army, who were reportedly involved in the protests. A total of 42 people were killed and 153 others injured, with most of them being protesters - only 3 soldiers were confirmed dead and 7 others wounded. The incident sparked a number of revenge attacks, that soon spread out across much of the country. Minister of Education Mohammed Tamim resigned from his post in response to the Army's operation, and was followed later by Science and Technology Minister Abd al-Karim al-Samarrai. Insurgents from the Naqshbandi Army completely captured the town of Sulaiman Bek, about 170 km north of Baghdad, after heavy fighting with security forces on April 25, only to relinquish control of it a day later, while escaping with weapons and vehicles. More than 340 were killed and 600 others injured in the four days of heaviest violence, while attacks continued after that at a pace higher than earlier in the year.

In late May, the Iraqi government launches Operation al-Shabah (Phantom), with the stated aim of severing contact between Al-Qaeda in Iraq and the Syrian al-Nusra Front by clearing militants from the border area with Syria and Jordan.

== Aftermath ==
From January 2014 onwards, the rise of the Islamic State, a major belligerent in the Syrian Civil War, has transformed the insurgency into a regional war that includes Syria, Iran and a large coalition of Western and Arab forces led by the United States.

== Humanitarian aid ==
- Armenia – provided aid to persecuted Yazidis in Iraq in August 2014.
- Australia – Australia delivered humanitarian aid to Iraqi Kurds in August 2014.
- Austria
- Belgium
- Canada
- Denmark
- Estonia
- Finland
- France
- Germany
- Hungary
- Ireland
- Italy
- Luxembourg
- Netherlands
- Norway
- Poland
- Portugal
- Slovakia
- Spain
- Sweden
- Switzerland
- Turkey
- United Arab Emirates – UAE provided aid for Iraqi refugees in Kurdistan in August 2014.
- United Kingdom – UK announced that its planes were to drop emergency aid to Iraqi refugees in August 2014.

== See also ==
- History of Iraq (2011–present)
- List of modern conflicts in the Middle East
- Anbar campaign (2013–14)
- Northern Iraq offensive (June 2014)
- Northern Iraq offensive (August 2014)
- Iraqi insurgency (2017–present)
