= 23 July 2012 Iraq attacks =

Terrorist incident in Iraq

- Part of Iraqi insurgency (post U.S. withdrawal)
- Date: 23 July 2012
- Target: Security forces; Government buildings; Shia Muslim neighbourhoods
- Attack type: Car bombs, suicide bombings, shootings
- Deaths: 116
- Injuries: 299
- Perpetrator: Islamic state of Iraq

The 23 July 2012 Iraq attacks were a series of simultaneous, coordinated bombings and shootings that struck the Iraqi security force and Shi'ite Muslim communities. At least 116 people were killed and 299 wounded in the attacks, making them the deadliest attacks in the country since May 2010. The Islamic State of Iraq claimed responsibility for the attacks.

== Background ==
The attacks occurred about seven months following the withdrawal of the United States military forces from the area, leaving the security of the country in the hands of the Iraqi security forces.

== Attacks ==
Numerous attacks were conducted within hours of each other on 23 July 2012 across thirteen cities in Iraq. Naharnet reported the number of towns and cities attacked as eighteen. The number of attacks, on the other hand, was given to be thirty. Two more attacks occurred late on 23 July 2012, increasing the number of attacks to thirty-two. Rod Nordland stated that the number of attacks was forty. The major targets of the attacks were security forces, government buildings and Shia Muslim neighbourhoods.

The first attack took place on an army base in Saladin Governorate around dawn. In Taji, nearly 20 miles (32 km) north of Baghdad, a series of bombs around a number of homes went off simultaneously; as police arrived and residents began searching the wreckage for survivors, a suicide bomber detonated himself, killing more. At least 41 people were killed in this attack, considered the worst of the overall event. A car bomb exploded near a government building in Sadr City in Baghdad, killing 16. At least five car bombs went off in Kirkuk. The insurgents attacked a base in Dhuluiya, killing 15 soldiers. In al-Husseiniya, a predominantly Shiite suburb in northeastern Baghdad and in Mosul, a total of six people were killed in bombing attacks. Explosion in Yarmouk, another neighborhood of Baghdad, killed at least four people and injured another 24. Nearly five people were also killed and 22 or 25 injured when a car bomb exploded near a busy market in Diwaniya. Of all the sites attacked, only Diwaniya is an undisputed Shiite territory. There were checkpoint shootings and bomb blasts in the ethnically mixed Diyala Governorate, resulting in 11 dead and 40 wounded. In the western city of Heet, a car bombing occurred near an army patrol, killing one soldier and injuring 10 others. The other towns and cities suffered from bombings were Saadiya, Khan Beni-Saad, Tuz Khurmatu, Dibis, Samarra and Dujail.

In addition to all these attacks took place daytime, there were two more attacks late in the day. One of these attacks was a car bomb blast near a café in the Shi'ite Ameen district in southeastern Baghdad, killing six men and wounding 24. The second was a roadside bombing near Baquba, a city northeast of Baghdad. The second blast killed three people and injured seven others.

== Perpetrators ==
Though no group claimed responsibility immediately after the killings, the attacks were believed by Iraqi officials, media and specialists to be orchestrated by Al Qaeda, seeking to gain control of the country following the departure of the American forces. An announcement purported to be from Abu Bakr al-Baghdadi, the current leader of the Islamic State of Iraq (ISI), had been broadcast on 21 July 2012; in the announcement, al-Baghdadi declared the intention towards a new offensive to retake the country, a move claimed to be supported by the Sunni population of Iraq. Previous attacks that have targeted the security forces have been attributed to al-Qaeda.

On 25 July 2012, the Islamic State of Iraq posted a statement on radical Islamist websites, indicating that it was responsible for the recent attacks, calling the attacks "Destroying the Walls" campaign. ISI also stated that it was just the start of a "new stage of jihad".

== Reactions ==
=== Domestic ===
- Iraq – An unnamed official for the current Iraqi government believed the attacks were made by the terrorist group al-Qaeda, as part of a larger scheme to ignite a "bloody sectarian war".

=== International ===
- Canada – Canada condemned the violence.
- France – French president, Francois Hollande, condemned the attacks and stated that his country would stand by Iraq and fully support its efforts to enhance stability and security.
- Iran – Tehran and the Iranian Foreign Ministry condemned the attack and expressed its full support to the Iraqi government.
- Russia – The Russian Foreign Ministry expressed its condolences to victims' relatives and support for the Iraqi government's measures to "stabilize the situation and boost security" in the country.
- Turkey – The Turkish Foreign Ministry condemned the bombings in Iraq and stated that it would maintain the solidarity with the people of Iraq in fighting terrorism.
- United Nations – The United Nations mission in Iraq strongly condemned the attacks.
- United States – US State Department spokeswoman Victoria Nuland condemned shootings and bomb attacks in Iraq.
