= Dora, Baghdad =

Dora الدورة
- Neighborhood of Baghdad
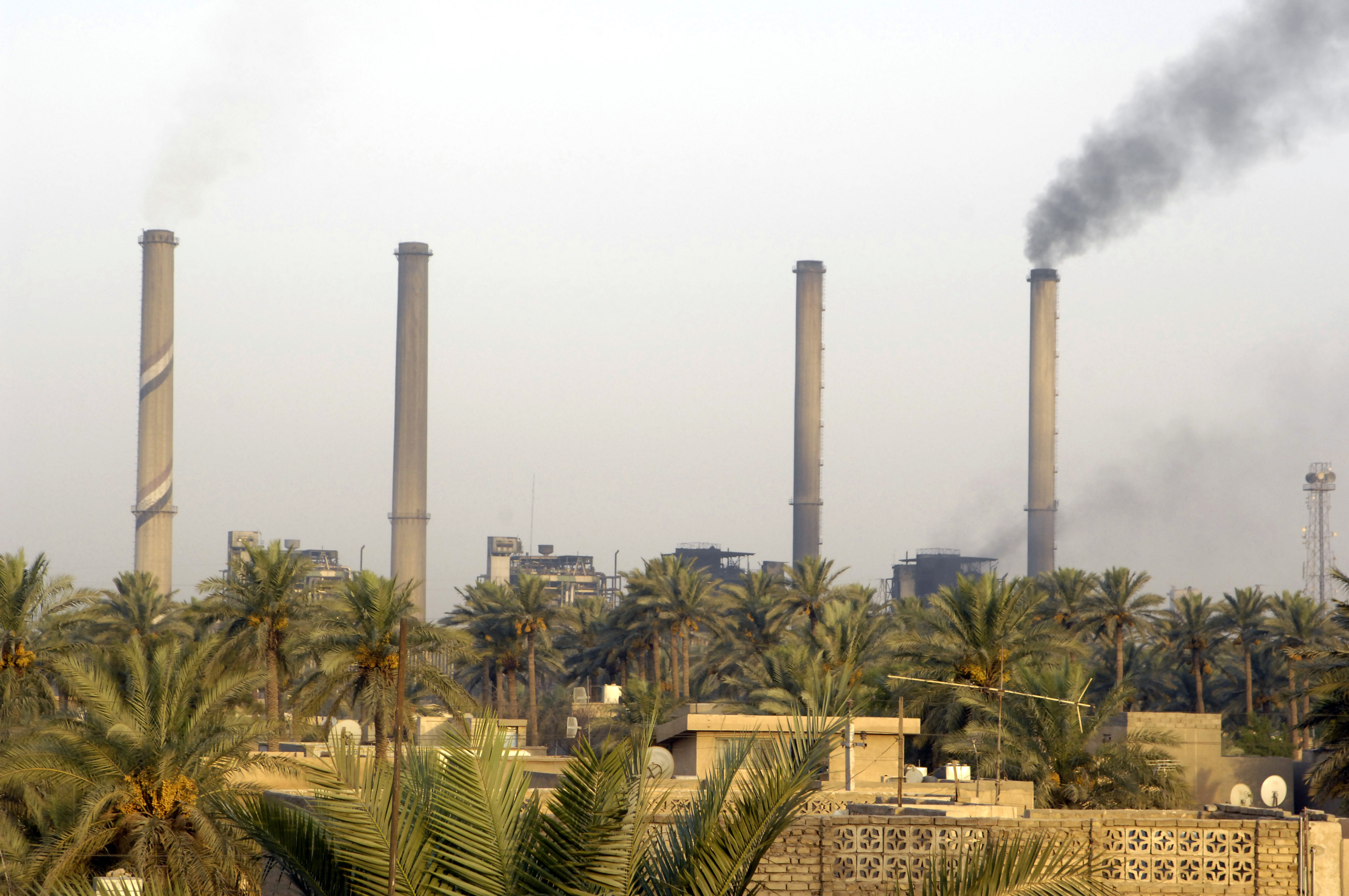
- Power plant in Dora, Baghdad.

- Location in Baghdad
- Coordinates: 33°15′5″N 44°23′31″E
- Country: Iraq
- Governorate: Baghdad Governorate
- City: Baghdad
- City district: Al Rashid

Dora (also al-Dura, or ad-Durah, Arabic: الدورة, Syriac: ܕܘܿܪܵܐ) is a neighborhood in Al Rashid administrative district, southern Baghdad, Iraq. Before the 2003 U.S. invasion of Iraq, it was home to the city's largest concentration of Christian Assyrians, as well as Mandaeans and Muslim families.

== History ==
The area was largely uninhabited until the 1950s when Assyrians from Habbaniya started settling down in Baghdad. Most houses and churches were built during the 1960s and 1970s while the booming neighbourhood attracted more middle-class families. Prior to the Iraq War, the area was home to the largest concentration of Assyrians and Mandeans, as well as mixed Sunni and Shi'ite families. Before the Iraq War, Dora was home to 150,000 Christians, mostly adherents of the Assyrian Church of the East and Chaldean Catholic Church.

=== Iraq War ===
In the early morning of March 19, 2003, U.S. forces initiated the invasion of Iraq by attacking a "buried command post" believed to be occupied by Saddam Hussein and his sons Uday and Qusay. In fact, the target did not exist; the strike on a disused above-ground regime leadership compound killed one civilian and injured fourteen others, including one child.

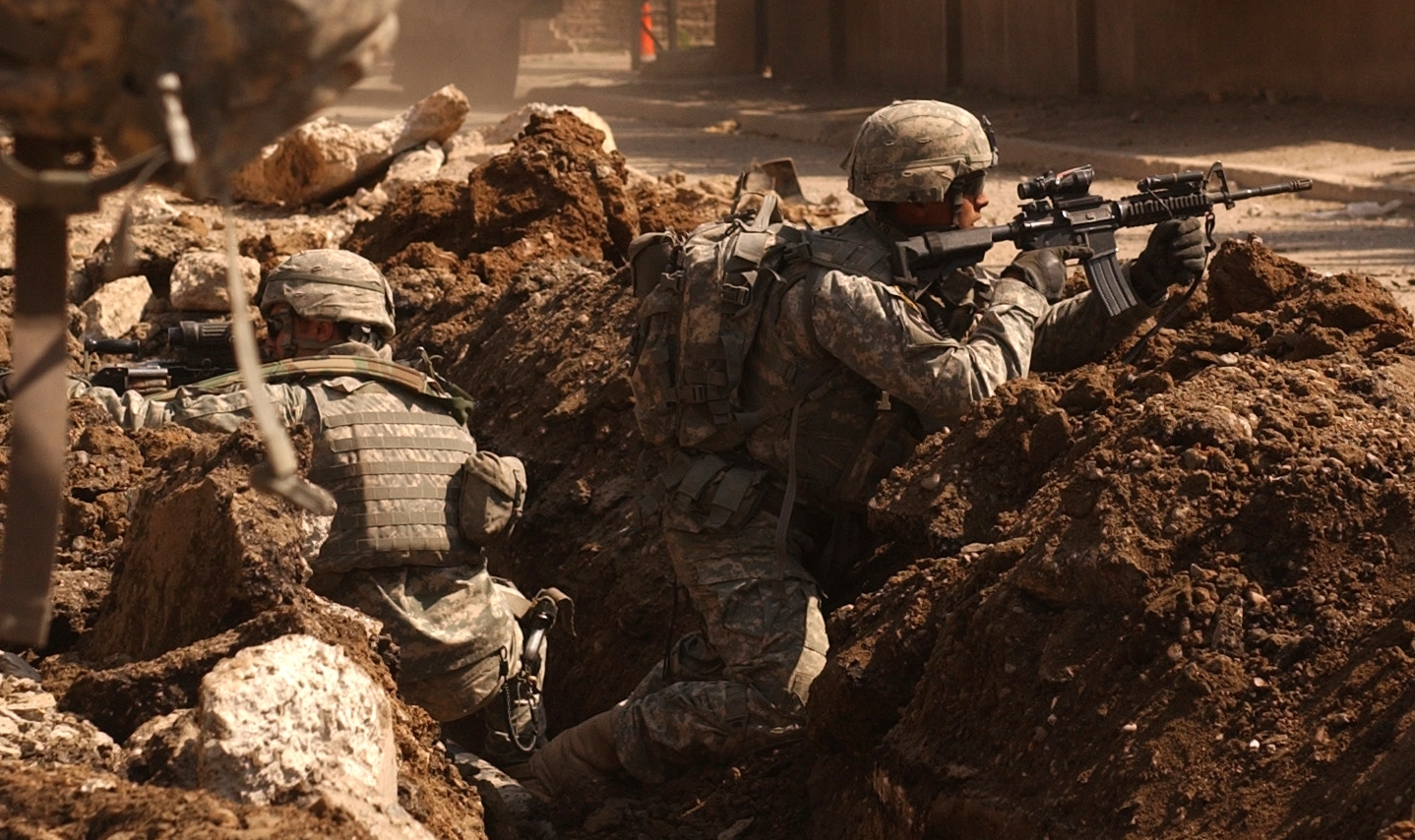
Army troops engage insurgents in Dora, March 2007

In April 2004, the 1st Battalion, 8th Cavalry Regiment, 1st Cavalry Division operating as motorized infantry was assigned the task of operations in the al-Dora neighborhood. It encountered al-Qaida-affiliated fighters and fought a pitched battle immediately upon taking over control of this sector from 2-504 PIR, 82nd Airborne Division and 1-94 FA, DIVARTY, 1st Armored Division. The unit sustained four KIA during its ensuing counterinsurgency operations there, but were able to stop al-Qaida control over the region until its departure in March 2005.

In 2005, 1-184 IN Battalion (AASLT), California National Guard, took responsibility of Dora. The 184th was attached to 4th BCT, 3ID. The battalion sector also included such hot spots as Arab Jabour and Hora Jeb. The battalion struggled with such a large area of operations, a sector that the unit they replaced had all but stopped patrolling months before their arrival, yet was recognized for its accomplishments which included the highest arrest rate of insurgents of any unit during 2005, guarding polling sites for both elections in 2005, and their execution of Operation Clean Sweep spoken of by President George Bush in his State of the Union address 2006. The battalion commander was relieved of his command due to actions of soldiers under his command and replaced by LTC William Wood, an active LTC from 2 BCT, 3ID. COL Cardon, the 4th BCT commander also sent CPT Michael McKinnon to assume command of Alpha Company 184th. The 184th Regiment was later awarded the U.S. Army's Valorous Unit Award for their actions in Al-Dora. The 184th lost 18 soldiers in their 12 months in Al Dora. COL Cardon sent CPT Dave Anderson along with his armor company (Charlie Co, 4-64 AR) to take responsibility of the Arab Jabour sector. Both LTC Wood and CPT McKinnon would be killed by IEDs several months after arriving, being replaced by LTC Everett Knapp and CPT Danjel Bout. Charlie 4-64 suffered several KIAs including 1SG Alan Gifford. CPT Anderson and many of his soldiers were wounded in action in their fight to contain al-Qa'ida fighters and Iraqi Sunni insurgents. Charlie Company 4-64 moved from FOB Falcon to establish and occupy OP Thorn in the heart of Arab Jabour. There they fought daily battles for several months against direct and indirect Sunni insurgent attacks. The tank company held OP Thorn until relieved by the 2/506 IN, 101st Airborne in January 2006. The 506th was accompanied by Bravo Company 1-35th Armor out of 2nd BCT, 1 Armored Division in Baumholder, Germany from April–November 2006. The 506th could not cover the entire sector and it again fell into the hands of al-Qa'ida fighters. In 2009 the Battalion was awarded the U.S. Army's Valorous Unit award for its actions in al-Dora. It became an al-Qaeda stronghold as affiliated foreign Islamic fighters entered the country after 2004. United States soldiers once called it "the most dangerous place in Iraq" until they were driven out.

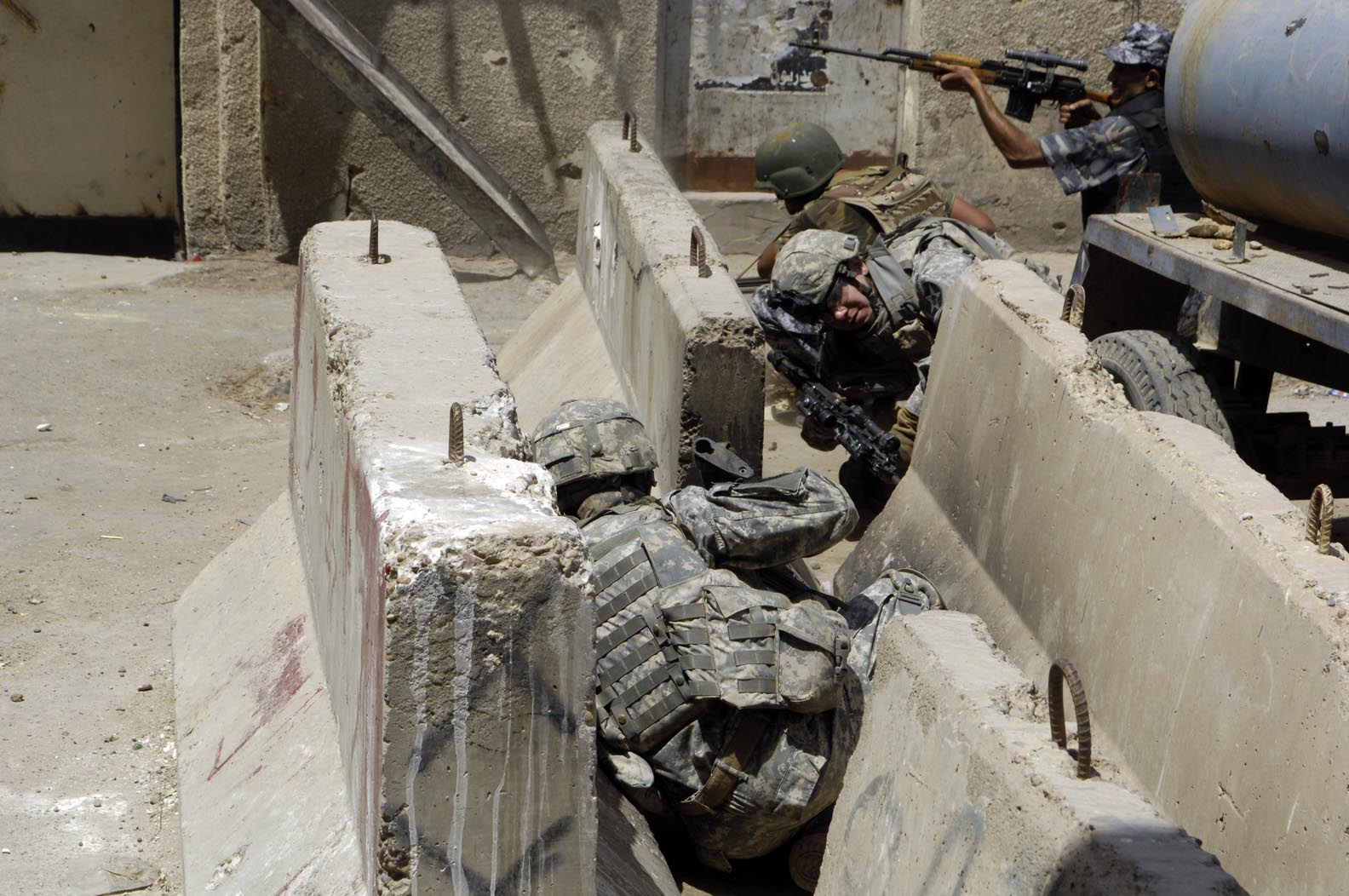
U.S. and Iraqi forces in Dora in July 2007

By May 2007, Dora was receiving mainstream media attention as a hornet's nest of sectarian violence. Christians were seen as 'soft targets' who would either pay or leave Dora rather than retaliate.

By 2010, Dora had become a predominantly Sunni neighbourhood with Assyrians being reduced to small enclaves. Further attacks in late 2010 forced even more families, including both Assyrians and Mandaeans, to flee to safer areas in- and outside Iraq.

== See also ==
- Assyrians in Iraq
- Hay Al-Sihah
