= 20 March 2012 Iraq attacks =

Series of terrorist attacks throughout Iraqi cities during the 2011-13 insurgency

- Part of Iraqi insurgency (post U.S. withdrawal)
- Location: Baghdad and at least 9 other cities, Iraq
- Date: 20 March 2012 (UTC+3)
- Target: Security offices, (Shiite) civilians
- Attack type: Suicide bombings, car bombs, IEDs, shootings
- Deaths: 52
- Injuries: ~250
- Perpetrator: Islamic State of Iraq

The 20 March 2012 Iraq attacks were the sixth simultaneous wave of bombings to hit Iraq during the insurgency and the second such major assault since the US withdrawal at the end of 2011. At least 50 people were killed and around 250 wounded in highly coordinated attacks spread out in at least 10 cities. The deadliest attack of the day took place in Karbala where twin bombings left 13 dead and 50 injured. In the northern city of Kirkuk a car parked in the parking lot of a local security office exploded, killing 13 and leaving almost 60 wounded. Several explosions rocked the capital Baghdad, including mortar attacks close to the Green Zone and a suicide blast near an intelligence building opposite the Foreign Ministry – three people were killed and nine wounded in that attack. Numerous other bombings and shootings took place all across the country, including Fallujah, Samarra, Baiji, Hillah, Latifiya, Tuz Khormato and others. A car bomb in Ramadi killed two and injured 11, as unidentified gunmen shot and killed two police officers in a nearby village. Authorities in Baqubah discovered and successfully disarmed at least eight explosive devices.

== Perpetrators ==
The umbrella group Islamic State of Iraq almost immediately claimed responsibility for the bombings and promised further bloodshed as it targets Shiites across Iraq. The country is set to host the postponed Arab League Summit on 29 March, in the midst of a surge of violence and a rise in civilian and security casualties since the withdrawal of US forces.

== See also ==
- Iraqi insurgency (post U.S. withdrawal)
