= January 2012 Iraq attacks =

2012 Suicide bombing in Al-Batha, Iraq

- Part of the Iraqi insurgency (2011–2013)
- January 2012 Iraq attacks (Iraq)
- Location: Baghdad, Basra, Nasiriyah and Mosul, Iraq
- Date: 5 January 2012; 14 January 2012; 27 January 2012 (UTC+3)
- Target: Shia civilians
- Attack type: suicide attacks, shootings
- Weapons: Car bombs, motorcycle bombs, roadside bombs, firearms
- Deaths: 73+ (5 January); 53+ (14 January); 32 (27 January); Total: 158+ killed
- Injuries: 149 (5 January); 130+ (14 January); 71 (27 January); Total: 350+ injured
- Perpetrator: Islamic State of Iraq

Throughout January 2012, a series of bombing and shooting attacks took place in multiple locations in Iraq, seemingly targeting Shia Muslims.

== 5 January attacks ==
On 5 January 2012, a numerous bombing attacks hit the capital of Baghdad and the southern city of Nasiriyah, appearing to target Shia Muslims. A suicide bomber attacked a security checkpoint as huge crowds of pilgrims were making the journey from Nasiriyah to Karbala for a religious holiday. At least 44 people were killed and 81 more injured in the first significant attack in the city since a blast targeted the Italian military headquarters in November 2003.

Meanwhile, in Baghdad, at least three bombs exploded in Sadr City next to a group of day laborers waiting to get hired. Interior Ministry officials confirmed at least 13 died in these attacks and 32 were injured. Several hours later, two car bombs in the Kadhimiya district of Baghdad left 16 dead and 36 injured.

In addition to these attacks, two people were killed and six injured in a shooting and roadside bombing in the insurgent stronghold of Mosul. The Islamic State of Iraq claimed responsibly for the attack a month afterwards on 6 February.

== 14 January attacks ==
On 14 January, a bomb exploded among crowds of Shia pilgrims at a security checkpoint in the city of Basra, killing at least 53 and injuring more than 130 others. The pilgrims were passing through the checkpoint on their way to a major Shia mosque in the Az Zubayr district, about 20km (12 miles) south-west of Basra. There were conflicting reports about the cause of the explosion, with some saying that a suicide bomber dressed as a police officer managed to reach the checkpoint after showing a fake ID card. Other reports blamed a powerful roadside bomb that had been planted close to the road. The attack occurred on the last of the 40 days of Arba'in, where hundreds of thousands of Shia pilgrims visit the city of Karbala and other holy sites. Security forces sealed off the main hospital after the attack, fearing further violence.

Following the attack, the Iraqi military "intensified" its security around the country. 30,000 Iraqi soldiers were deployed in Karbala to protect pilgrims. Officials believe at least 16 million pilgrims have passed through the city of Karbala in the past two weeks. Other attacks took place throughout Iraq that day. Roadside bombings in Mosul, Baqubah and Al-Karmah left one policeman dead and at least nine people injured. A car bombing targeting a police patrol in Tikrit killed a bystander and injured two officers.

Ali Ghanim, the chief of the security committee in Basra, said the attack was carried out by a suicide bomber. He said, "There was a man who was holding a box and giving food to people, and one of our security officers found him suspicious and went to search the box and the man blew himself up". So far, no group has claimed responsibility for the attack.

== 27 January attack ==
At least 32 people were killed and 71 wounded in a bombing in Baghdad on 27 January. A suicide bomber targeting Shias detonated his vehicle at a funeral tent in Zaafaraniyah district in the south of Baghdad. The procession was being held for a local real estate broker who had been murdered by unidentified gunmen the previous day.

== See also ==
- List of terrorist incidents, January–June 2012
