= 16 August 2012 Iraq attacks =

Terrorist incident in Iraq

- Part of Iraqi insurgency (post U.S. withdrawal)
- Location: across central and northern Iraq
- Date: 16 August 2012 (UTC+3)
- Target: Iraqi security forces, Shia civilians
- Attack type: Car bombs, suicide bombings, roadside bombs, shootings
- Deaths: 128
- Injuries: 417

A series of bombings and shootings occurred in Iraq on 16 August 2012, in one of the most violent attacks since post-US withdrawal insurgency has begun. At least 128 people were killed and more than 400 wounded in coordinated attacks across Iraq, making them the deadliest attacks in the country since October 2009, when 155 were killed in twin bombings near the Justice Ministry in Baghdad.

== Background ==
The attacks occurred about eight months following the withdrawal of the United States military forces from the area, leaving the security of the country in the hands of the Iraqi security forces. Several major attacks took place in the months of June and July, following a statement released by Islamic State of Iraq to announce the start of a new "offensive".

== Attacks ==
Numerous attacks were conducted within hours of each other on 16 August 2012 across Baghdad and several central and northern provinces in Iraq.

At least 52 people were killed and 177 injured in attacks across Baghdad, with most casualties from two car bombings in the predominantly Shi'ite districts of Zaafaraniya and Sadr City. The deadliest blast happened near an amusement park in Zaafaraniya, claiming 27 lives and injuring 75, most of them women and children. An earlier attack near the park had killed 2 and left 11 injured. Two car bombs exploded next to a government building in the Husseiniya district, killing 7 and injuring 42. In the evening, a car bomb was detonated close to a military checkpoint in Sadr City, killing at least 16 and leaving 49 wounded.

Gunmen using silencers shot 10 soldiers dead at a checkpoint in Mushada, northwest of Baghdad, injuring at least 10 others. At least seven explosions and several shootings killed 8 and wounded 29 in Kirkuk, while a suicide car bombing killed 11 officers and injured 31 others at an anti-terrorism office in Daquq. A suicide bombing at a tea shop in Tal Afar killed 7 and injured 25. Attacks in Mosul killed another nine people and injured 27. Ten people were killed and 9 injured in three separate incidents in Diyala Governorate near Baqubah, most of them members of the security forces. A car bomb in Kut killed at least 7 and injured more than 70 others. Four police officers were killed and six injured in attacks around Fallujah. Gunmen killed two civilians at a market in Baaj, and a bomb in Tuz Khurmatu killed a woman and injured 4 others. Bombings also took place in Badush, Abu Ghraib, Al Wajehiya, Hawija, Ramadi and Iskandariya, killing 4 and leaving 24 injured. Unidentified gunmen killed three and injured 5 others in several attacks in Dhouib, al-Rasul and Aswad.

== Perpetrators ==
Though no group has claimed responsibility, the attacks are believed to be orchestrated by al-Qaeda, seeking to regain control of the country following the departure of the American forces.

== Reactions ==
=== Domestic ===
An unnamed official for the current Iraqi government believed the attacks were made by al-Qaeda and their allies, as part of a larger scheme to ignite "a bloody sectarian war".
