= Baghdad Airport Road =

Road in Baghdad, Iraq

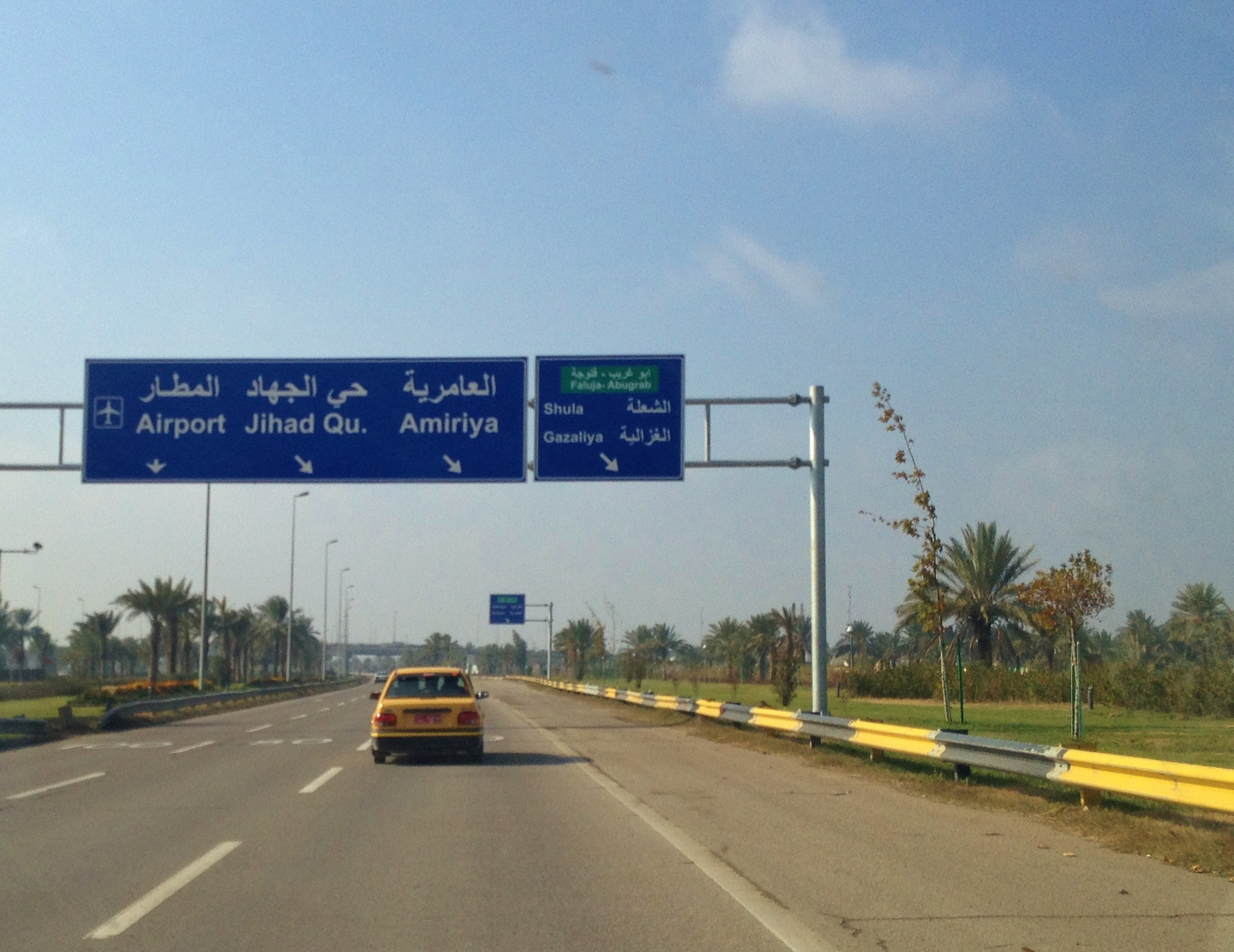
A signboard on the road showing diversions for Al-Jihad and Amiriya

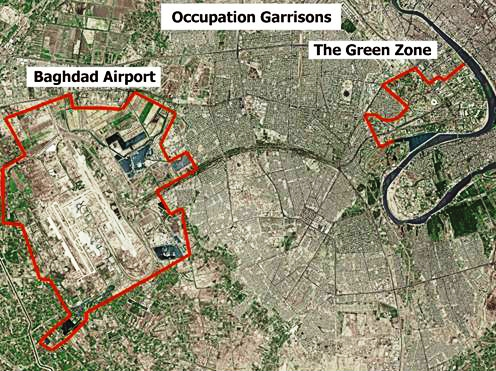
An aerial view of Baghdad International Airport and the Green Zone in Baghdad, in June 2004

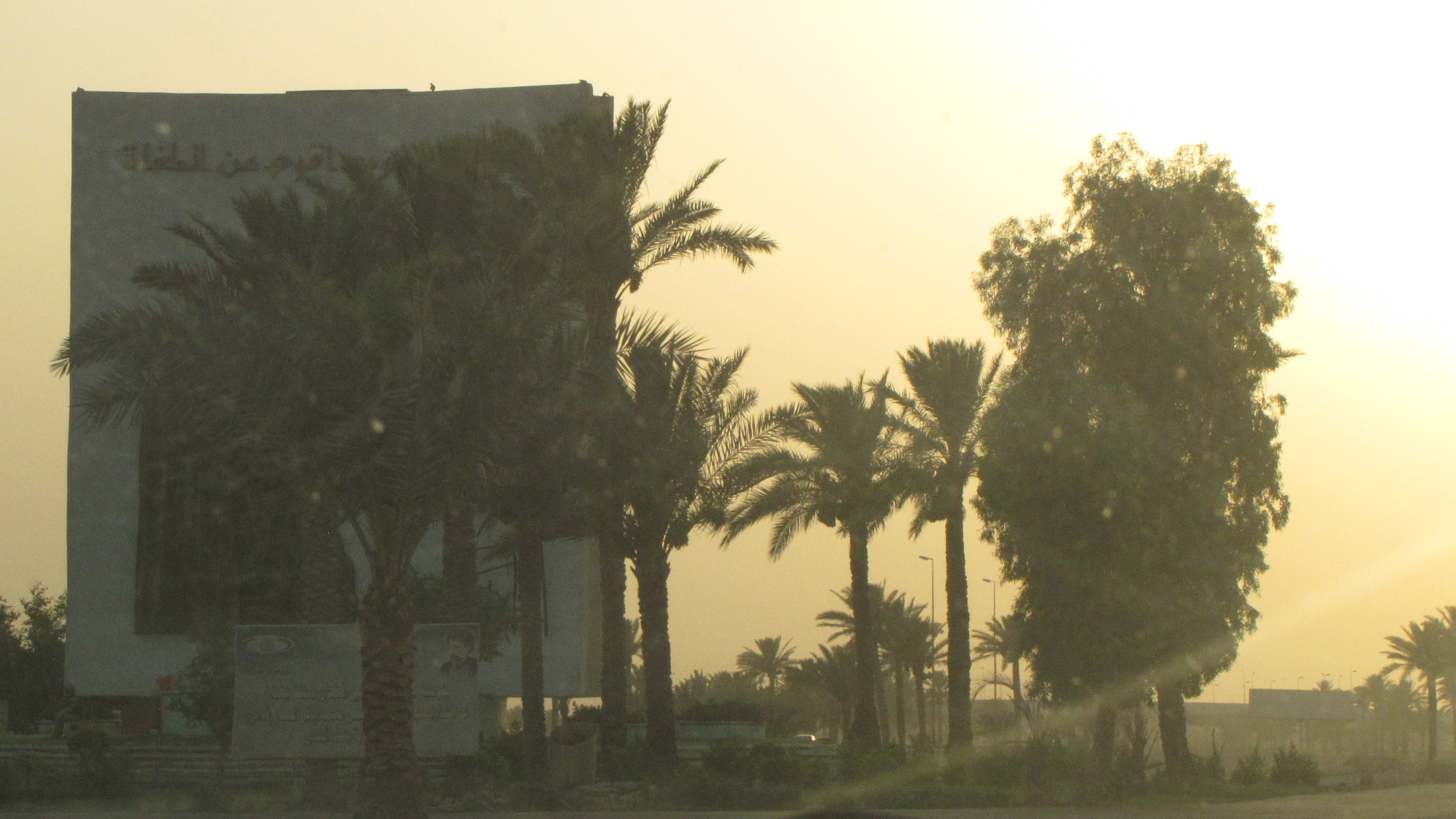
Airport Road Monument

The Baghdad Airport Road is a 12-kilometre (7.5 mi) stretch of highway in Baghdad, Iraq linking the Green Zone, a heavily fortified area at the centre of Baghdad, to Baghdad International Airport (BIAP). It also links different parts of Baghdad to the Airport and connects neighbouring areas to each other. The region stretching around the road and the airport have emerged as an important investment destination and a new phase of city's modern expansion after Al-Mansour district.

== History ==
Baghdad Airport Road gained prominence following the 2003 US invasion of Iraq, when it was captured by the Coalition forces. Although it was commonly referred to by the military Main Supply Route (MSR) designation Route Irish, the route from the International Zone to the airport stretches over two MSRs: Route Aeros, the section leading into and out of the International Zone, and Route Irish, which stretches east from the airport, then turns south (past the junction with Route Aeros) to a junction with Highway 1 (MSR Tampa).

Because of heavy military traffic and high-profile convoys, the route from the International Zone to the airport was extremely dangerous in the years following the invasion. The many roadside bombs, suicide bombers attacking its checkpoints, drive-by shootings and random shooting from the areas on both sides of the road have led to its notoriety. In late 2004 after aggressive patrolling by the 1st Cav 4/5 ADA (Alpha and Bravo Batteries), and the 1/69th Infantry during Operation Wolfhound the road became safer and more reliable.

In 2008, Baghdad Airport Road underwent construction to repair and repave the road. A beautification and redevelopment plan for the road was announced in 2010 in anticipation of the Arab Summit in 2011.

== See also ==
- Falastin Street
- Haifa Street
- Al-Jumhuriya Street
