= Taji, Iraq =

Taji التاجي
- District
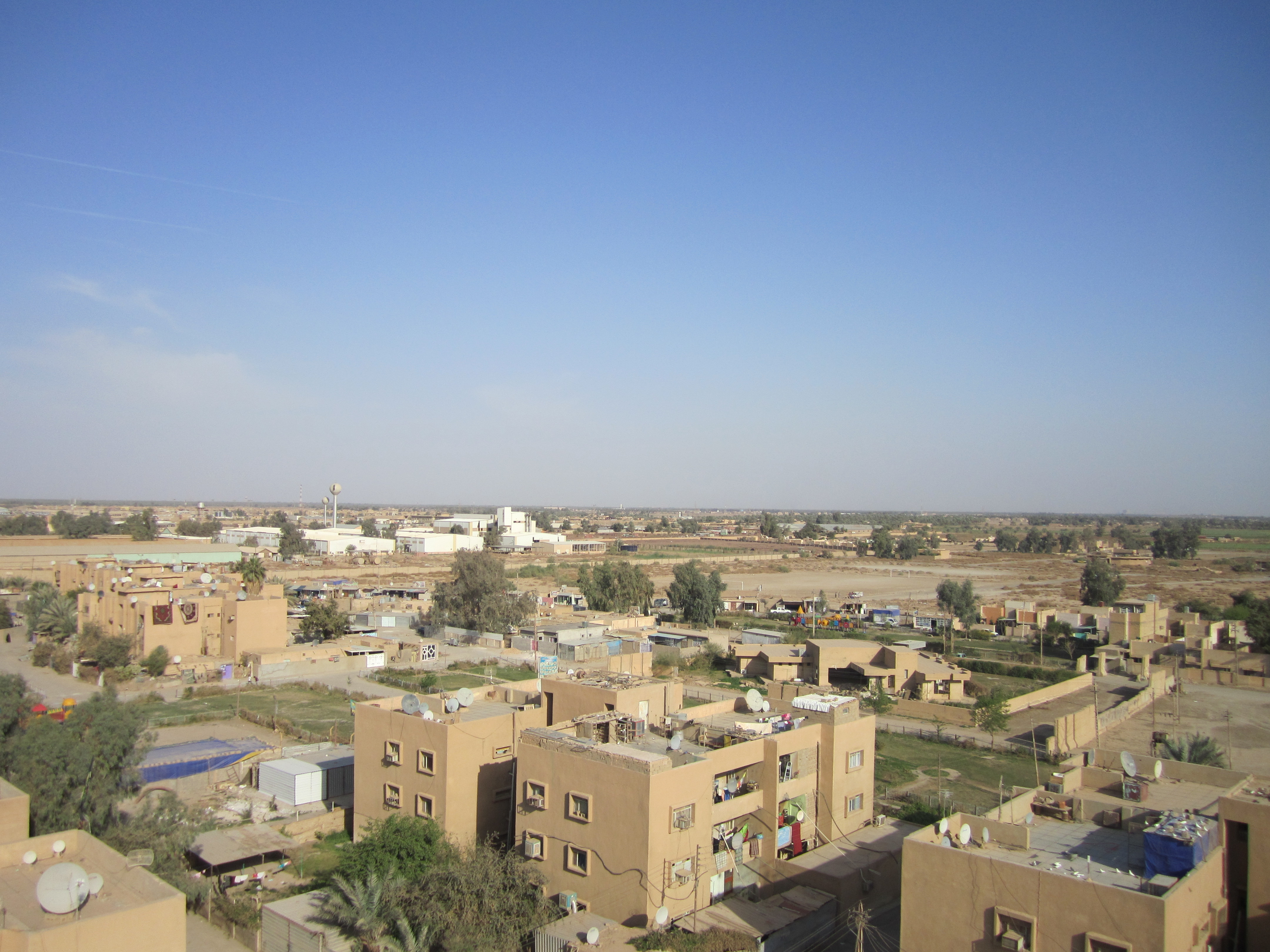
- 2012 view over Taji
- Interactive map of Taji
- Taji's location inside Iraq
- Coordinates: 33°30′33″N 44°14′03″E
- Country: Iraq
- Governorate: Baghdad Governorate
- District: Taji District
- District established: 22 January 2020

Area
  - Total: 207 km^{2} (80 sq mi)

Population (2022)
  - Total: 190,297
  - Density: 919/km^{2} (2,380/sq mi)
- Time zone: UTC+3 (AST)

Taji is a district in the far north of Baghdad Governorate in central Iraq. It was formerly a subdistrict of Kadhimiya District and became a district on 22 January 2020. It consists of seven administrative divisions, has an area of 207 square kilometres, and had a population of 190,297 in 2022.

The Taji area begins immediately after the Baghdad Gate. The first areas include Al-Sabiyat, Arkiya, Fadil, Al-Tajiyat, and Al-Masabih, extending to the Dhira' Dijla Bridge. These areas are commonly known as Taji I, while the areas beyond the bridge are known as Taji II, and the Taji region extends northward until the area of Tarmiyah.

== History ==
Al-Taji airfield, in the volatile Sunni Triangle, was originally an Iraqi Republican Guard base during the Saddam era. It was once a center for the manufacture of chemical weapons. Taji was also the location of the largest tank maintenance facility in Iraq. Al-Taji airfield came under American control following the US invasion and was subsequently renamed Camp Cooke.

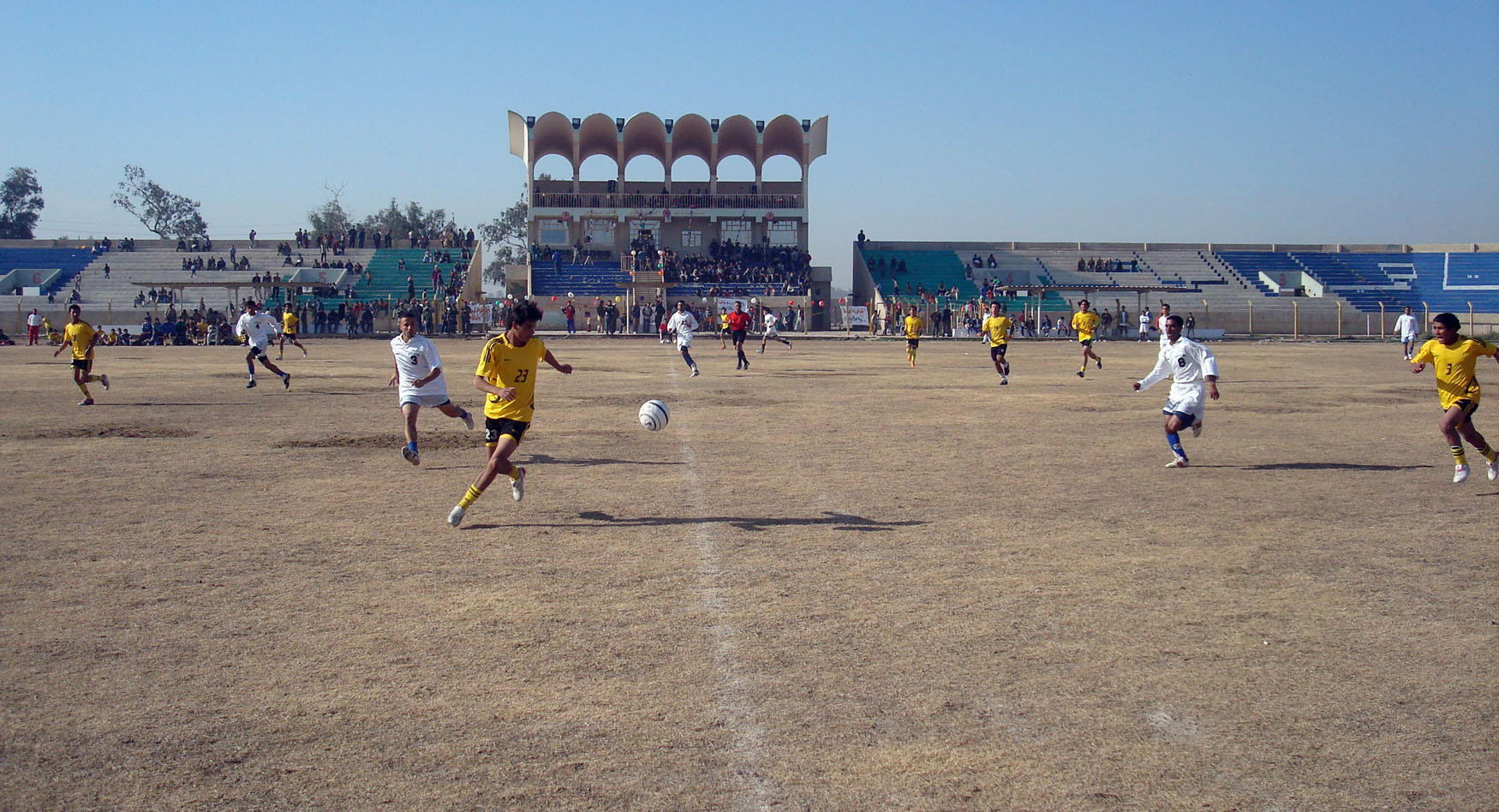
A football match in Taji

== Administrative divisions of Taji Subdistrict ==
The area of Taji Subdistrict is 388 square kilometers, equivalent to 155,200 dunams. It is bordered by the Tigris River to the east, Al-Tarmia District to the north, Al Anbar Governorate to the west, and the center of Kadhimiya District and Dhat Al-Salasil Subdistrict to the south.

=== District subdivisions ===
According to a decision by the Minister of Planning in January 2020, Taji Subdistrict was upgraded to a district consisting of seven divisions. The district center is part of Division 7 (Al-Bur).

Subdivisions of Taji District
Division	Area (km²)	Population (2022)	Population (1997)
Taji Center	8.7	60,240	28,663
1 Al-Mazra'ah and Al-Hasiywah	70.3	28,879	11,595
7 Al-Bur	14.1	3,786	1,520
12 Al-Dhabai	55.1	20,753	8,332
24 Abu Adham	22.6	37,561	15,080
25 Hawr Al-Basha	19.4	13,756	5,523
27 Al-Hammamiyat	16.8	25,322	10,167
Total district	207	190,297	80,880

== Taji Air Base ==
Taji Air Base is located about 30 km north of the city of Baghdad. It includes an airfield and a large military base that originally belonged to the Iraqi Republican Guard during the rule of Saddam Hussein.

The base was one of the main military installations in Iraq and contained a large industrial complex supporting the Iraqi armed forces.

According to reports and inspections conducted after the Gulf War, facilities in the Taji complex were linked to Iraq's programs for chemical weapons and other weapons of mass destruction.

Taji was also the location of one of the largest tank maintenance and repair facilities in Iraq.

== See also ==
- Baghdad Districts
- List of cities in Iraq
- Iraq War
