= 6th Division (Iraq) =

- Active: 1959–2003; August 2005 – present
- Country: Iraq
- Branch: Iraqi Army
- Type: Motorised Infantry
- Part of: 2010: Baghdad Operational Command (?); Iraqi Ground Forces Command
- Garrison/HQ: Baghdad
- Colors: Black & Yellow
- Engagements: Yom Kippur War; Golan Heights; Iran–Iraq War; Operation Tariq al-Quds; Operation Fath al-Mobin; Operation Beit ol-Moqaddas; Second Battle of Al Faw; Gulf War; Battle of Khafji; Iraq War; Invasion of Iraq; Battle of Nasiriyah; Iraqi insurgency

Commanders
- Notable commanders: Major-General Mubdar Hatim al-Dulaimi; Jawad Rumi Daini

The 6th Division is a formation of the Iraqi Army, first formed after 1959, converted to armoured status by 1973, but disbanded in 2003. It was reformed as part of the new army in August 2005.

The division was present during the Yom Kippur War on the Golan Heights, but does not appear to have seen much action. One of its components during the war was the 30th Armoured Brigade. It fought during several battles of the Iran–Iraq War. Later in the war, it was present at the Second Battle of Al Faw of 1988 with 7th Infantry Division. It operated with IV Corps during the Persian Gulf War and then fought against the Kurds in the north in 2000. It was assigned to the III Corps just before the 2003 invasion of Iraq. At the time, it included the 25th Mechanised Brigade, 30th Armoured Brigade, and 70th Armoured Brigade. It was equipped with T-55s and BMP-1s. It was rendered incapable for combat during the Battle of Nasiriyah in March 2003, during the invasion. It was then dissolved along with the rest of the Iraqi Army by Coalition Provisional Authority Order Number 2.

The reconstruction of the Iraqi Army began in 2003. The units that would eventually form the 6th Division began to be created soon afterwards. "While most of the 6th Division's battalions are former Iraqi National Guard units, some with their origins in the ING's predecessor, the Iraqi Civil Defence Corps, the division headquarters was not formed until August 2005."

The 6th Division is the oldest formation of the army in Baghdad. Its subordinate formations included:

- 1 (Cobras) Motorised Bde. McGrath writes that this brigade was redesignated from the 40th Brigade, Iraqi National Guard, seemingly some time after it assumed control of an area of responsibility in Baghdad in February 2005. The brigade originally appears to have been made up of the 302nd, 303rd, 306th, and 307th Battalions (ICDC or ING).
- 2 Brigade. Not listed as active circa March 2010. Established October 2004 by Jawad Rumi Daini in east Baghdad, a territory encompassing the Sunni enclave of Adhamiya, and Sadr City. This brigade, one of the best brigades in the division, was used as the basis for the 11th Division (today it's the 42nd Brigade).
- 3 (Baghdad Eagles) Commando (Air Assault) Brigade – today called the 25th Brigade, now has been transferred to the 17th Commando Division.
- 4 (Defenders of Baghdad) Infantry (Air Assault) Brigade

The division was previously commanded by Major General Mubdar Hatim al-Dulaimi, who was killed in 2006.

Cooperating with the Sunni Awakening put U.S. brigade commander Pinkerton "..squarely at odds with Brigadier General Nasser Ghanam, commander of the 3d Brigade, 6th Iraqi Army Division, known as the Muthanna Brigade. Although Ghanam presented himself as a professional, the general reportedly maintained ties with both Shi’a militia leaders and AQI, periodically releasing prisoners or returning confiscated equipment in exchange for bribes. Soon, the Muthanna Brigade began raiding sites where Pinkerton held meetings with former insurgents; however, the U.S. colonel saw through the charade and shifted his meetings to places outside the Muthanna Brigade’s sector.”

"In retrospect, it also might have been the case in Abu Ghraib that Maliki was not simply declining to rein in an obstructive Iraqi commander, Nasser Ghanam, but was directing the commander’s actions. In later years, the coalition would find that Nasser and Maliki had close personal ties that potentially meant Nasser was acting on Maliki’s instructions."

When Colonel Burton’s 2nd Brigade, 1st Infantry Division "..closed in on the Araji-controlled shrine on April 29, 2007, to detain JAM leaders they knew to be present, they came under RPG and small-arms fire [Rayburn and Sobchak, Vol II, p210-211]. The Americans ..called on a battalion from the 1st Brigade, 6th Iraqi Army Division, for assistance, but rather than helping them, the Iraqi soldiers came to the aid of JAM militants in the shrine. The ensuing 2-day standoff resulted in the deaths of at least nine Iraqi soldiers who had allied themselves with the militia and ended with a Parliamentary decree barring U.S. troops from a 1-square-kilometer zone around the shrine."

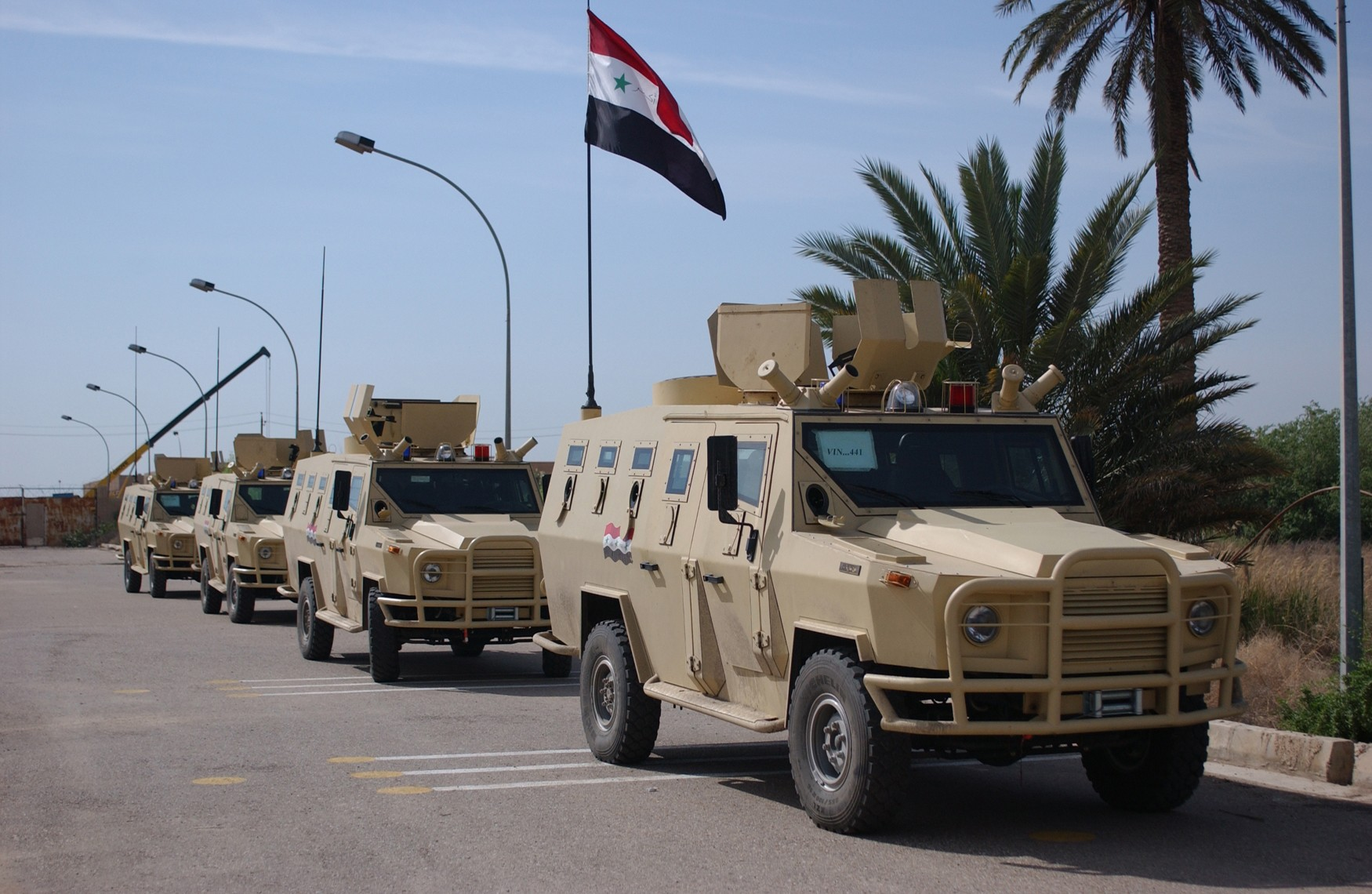
The 6th Army Division's military police company received four Polish vehicles in March 2006 from the Iraqi Defense Ministry. The Dzik-3s are a huge upgrade from the light utility vehicles the MPs have used since the start of the war.

In March 2010 the division order of battle was estimated by DJ Elliott as:

- Division Headquarters – Western Baghdad. The Commanding General also commanded the Karkh Area Command (KAC), covering the five western Baghdad districts of Kadhimiyah, Karkh, Mansour, Bayaa, and Doura.
- 6th Special Troops Battalion-W Baghdad (Old Muthanna) HMMWV/6x6
- 22nd (Cobras) Motorised Brigade – AAslt trng in Ninawa Feb10
  - 22nd Brigade Special Troops Bn-Moving to Mosul HMMWV/6x6;
  - Battalions in NW Baghdad (Kadhimiyah), 3-22 Bn Abu Atham
  - Mortar battery, planned brigade support battalion
- 24th (Muthanna) Motorised Brigade – Logistics C1 by Sep08?
  - 24th Brigade Special Troops Battalion-Abu Ghraib HMMWV/6x6
  - 1-24 and 2-24 Battalions W Baghdad (Bayaa)
  - 3-24 Motorized (AAslt) Battalion-Abu Ghraib HMMWV/6x6
  - 4-24 Motorized Battalion-Camp Constitution (trng) DZIK3/HMMWV/6x6
  - 24th Field Artillery Battalion 1 9-tube 120mm Mortar Btry
  - 24th Brigade Support Battalion Probably Planned
- 54th (Defenders of Baghdad) Motorised (AAslt) Brigade
  - 54th Brigade Special Troops Bn-W Baghdad (Mansour) HMMWV/6x6
  - 1-54 Motorized (AAslt) Battalion-W Baghdad (Khadimiyah) HMMWV/6x6
  - 2-54, 3-54, and 4-54 Battalions at Mansour.

The division is responsible for the Baghdad West sector.

It is possible that the 54th Brigade may be attached to a new 15th Division planned for Baghdad-West. This will be created with the units in excess of the 25th Brigade as a base at FOB Kalsu in Iskandariyah.

The former Baghdad Brigade was previously reported as having been re-designated as the 56th Brigade. Now, it has been re-subordinated to the 6th Motorized Division. On 22 December 2009, 135 members of the 56/6 Brigade completed mechanized infantry courses and qualified on the M113A2 Armored Personnel Carrier at the Camp Taji Armor School. M113A2s usually have a crew of 2 each and carry 11 infantry. This many crew graduating indicates that the 56/6 Brigade is converting to a Combined Arms or Armored Brigade since that is crew for 6 companies of mechanized infantry. The 56/6 Brigade has a brigade number belonging to the unformed 15th Division and could be a temporary assignment pending the formation of a new division.
