= Jawad Rumi Daini =

- Born: 1948 (age 77–78); Iraq
- Military career
- Allegiance: Baathist Iraq (? – July 1990); Iraq (January 2004 – 2 July 2006)
- Branch: Iraqi Army
- Service years: ? – July 1990; January 2004 – 2 July 2006
- Rank: Major-General
- Unit: 2nd Brigade, 6th Division
- Commands: Iraqi Army Commander in East Baghdad; Commander of the 2nd Brigade, 6th Division
- Conflicts: Iran–Iraq War Iraq War: Iraqi Civil War; 2005 Baghdad bridge stampede

Major General Jawad Rumi Daini (born ca. 1948) is a former general in the Iraqi Army who currently lives in exile in Egypt

Daini fought in the Iran–Iraq war, and served in the Iraqi Army under the Baathist government until he was forced into retirement in July 1990 after it was discovered that his brother was a member of the Badr Brigade. After the invasion he was faced with the problem of whether to join the Iraqi Army or the Iraqi insurgency. Eventually he was asked to join the new Iraqi Army and was enlisted in January 2004. Under his command he established the 2nd Brigade of the 6th Division.

He was eventually forced into retirement following three major events. He was one of the two Iraqi commanders overseeing the Al-Aaimmah bridge when the 2005 Baghdad bridge stampede occurred. During the subsequent investigation numerous conflicting testimonies were heard regarding who was responsible for the stampede. Eventually both men were cleared of all charges.

The second major event leading to his retirement was a raid at a police station in Jadriya. Following a tip that a kidnapped boy was being detained at the station, US and Iraqi forces raided the police station, finding hundreds of malnourished prisoners being kept in cramped conditions. Daini was criticized by the Iraqi Army for not tipping them off about the raid.

Tensions between Daini and the political establishment continued to grow until reaching a boiling point in June 2006 when Daini's soldiers arrested a Mahdi Army death squad. Daini refused to release the men following several requests by phone from the new prime minister Nouri Maliki. On July 2 the Cabinet decided to release him from the army.

Following his forced retirement, his son Haidar was abducted and murdered, with his body being discovered in a neighborhood controlled by the Mahdi Army. As a result of this and continued threats Daini and his wife and two daughters fled to Egypt.
