= Karbala stampede =

Human stampede in Iraq in 2019

Karbala crowd collapse
- Karbala (Iraq)
- Date: 10 September 2019
- Location: Karbala, Iraq; 32°36′59″N 44°02′01″E
- Type: Crowd crush
- Deaths: 31
- Injuries: 102

The Karbala stampede occurred on 10 September 2019, 31 people were killed and approximately 100 more were injured in a crowd crush during Ashura processions in Karbala, Iraq. There are conflicting accounts of what caused the crush, one claimed that a walkway collapsed, leading the crowd to panic. Another account stated that one person tripped and fell among the runners and others fell over him.

== Background ==
Ashura is an important holiday in the Islamic calendar, marking the death of Husayn ibn Ali (Imam Hussein), a grandson of Muhammad. He was killed in 680 AD in the Battle of Karbala which became a central event to Shia Islam. Since then, the first ten days of Muharram, the first month of the Islamic calendar, are a national holiday in Shia Islamic countries, with the tenth day culminating in Ashura.

The Ashura day of mourning in Karbala was the target of a terrorist attack in 2004, when simultaneous bombings in Karbala and Najaf killed 134 people. A 2005 stampede had occurred in Baghdad during a similar event, caused by word that the event might be subject to a terrorist bombing. More recently, several attacks on Ashura processions have been perpetrated by Sunni extremists.

== Stampede ==
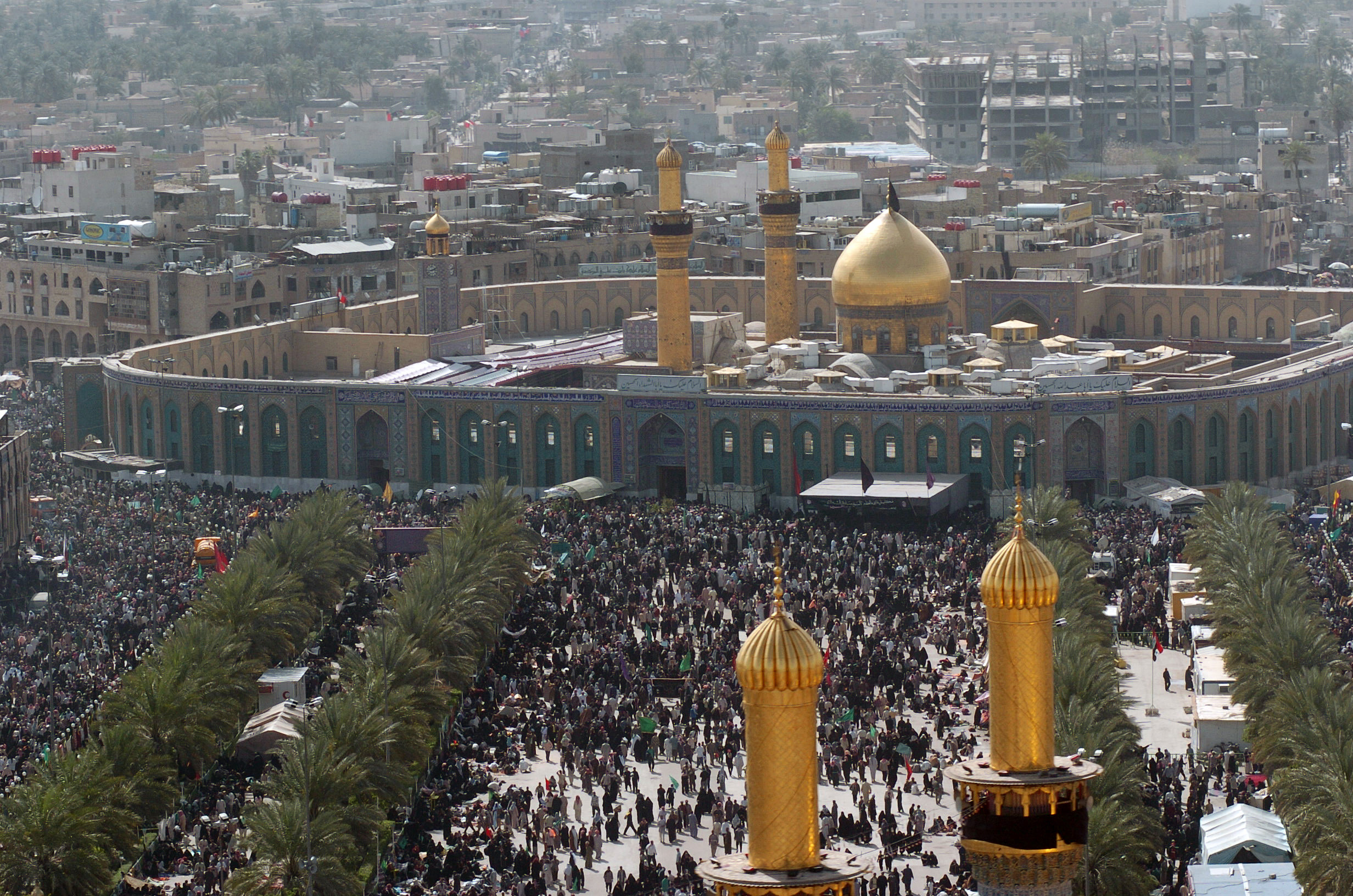
Thousands of pilgrims at the Imam Husayn Shrine in 2005

One of the common events during the commemoration of Ashura in Karbala is the Tuwairij run, where pilgrims run through the streets about 2–3 kilometres (1–2 mi) to the Imam Husayn Shrine in honour of the run that maternal cousins of Husayn's half-brother Abbas did from the village of Tuwairij (today known as Al-Hindiya) to Karbala in order to aid Husayn in the Battle of Karbala. The event around noon on 10 September 2019 drew hundreds of thousands of pilgrims planning to make the run. Reports varied as to what caused the crush; one claimed that a walkway collapsed, leading the crowd to panic. Another account stated that one person tripped and fell among the runners and others fell over him, cascading into the fatal crush.

Authorities came in to calm the crowds and assess the damage. At least 31 people were killed in the chaos, with at least 100 injured and sent to local hospitals. At least 10 of those injured were in critical condition.

== Reactions ==
Authorities are investigating the cause of the event. Iraqi president Barham Salih and prime minister Adil Abdul-Mahdi offered their condolences for the loss, as well as the United States Ambassador to Iraq, Matthew H. Tueller. The Iraqi Foreign Office released a statement saying that there was no Pakistani among the dead.
