= Kadhimiyya Women's Prison =

Prison in Baghdad, Iraq

Kadhimiyya Women's Prison is a correctional facility in Kadhimiyya, Baghdad, Iraq. As of 2006, it was one of the main three prisons in Iraq which housed women. It was the only correctional facility in Baghdad which housed women until 2009.

It was originally a palace of the mother of King Faisal of Iraq, Queen Aurea.

As of 2006 it housed prisoners convicted of prostitution, terrorism, and murder.
