= Adhamiyah =

Al-Adhamiyah District قضاء الأعظمية
- District
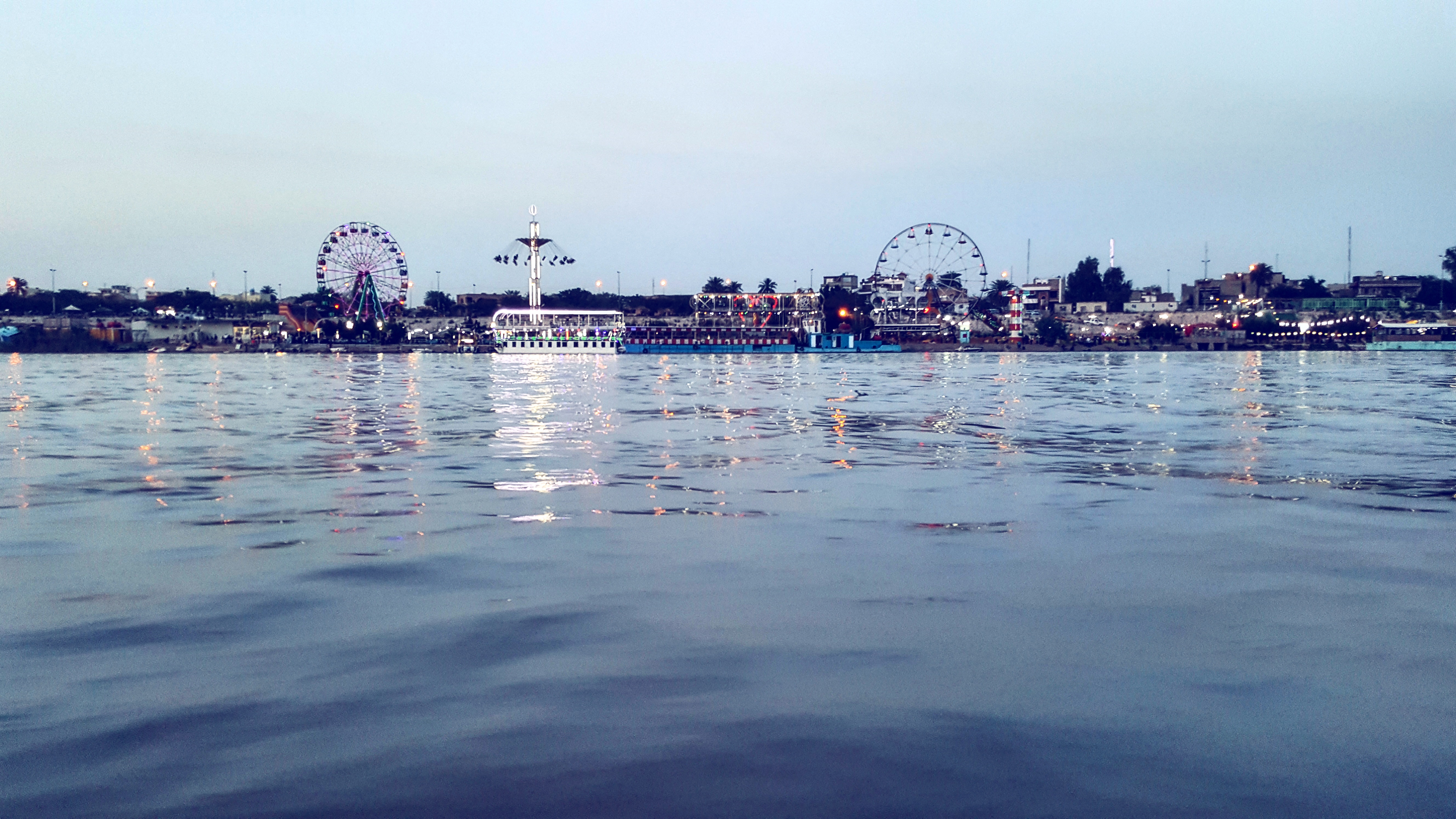
- View of Al-Adhamiyah District in 2000
- Etymology: Named after Imam Abū Ḥanīfah an-Nuʿmān (al-Imām al-Aʿẓam)
- Nickname: The Shrine District
- Interactive map of Al-Adhamiyah District
- Location in Iraq
- Coordinates (Abu Hanifa Mosque): 33°23′23″N 44°22′19″E
- Country: Iraq
- Governorate: Baghdad Governorate
- City: Baghdad
- First settled: Abbasid Period
- Administrative center: Al-Adhamiyah

Government
  - Type: District Council
  - Body: Baghdad Mayoralty

Area
  - Total: 36 km^{2} (14 sq mi)
- Approximate size

Population (Est. pre-2003)
  - Total: ~900,000
  - Density: 25,000/km^{2} (65,000/sq mi)
- Majority Sunni
- Demonym: Adhamiyawi (الأعظمي)
- Time zone: UTC+3 (AST)
- Postal code: 100XX
- Area code: +964
- ISO 3166 code: IQ-BG
- Home of the Abu Hanifa Mosque

Al-Adhamiyah (Arabic: الأعظمية, romanized: al-ʾaʿẓamiyya; ALA-LC: al-A‘ẓamīyah), also Azamiya, is a neighborhood and east-central district of the city of Baghdad, Iraq. It is one of nine administrative districts in Baghdad.

Adhamiyah neighborhood, or the shrine district, is located north-west of the city center and is an upscale area. This is not to be confused with a much larger Adhamiyah district of Baghdad, which is nearly 9 times larger and has as many times the inhabitants. The shrine area, Adhamyiah proper, has about 100,000 inhabitants. This area was 95% Sunni, 5% Shi'ite before 2003 and the Iraqi invasion. After the Iraqi civil war (2006–2008), it is now nearly totally Sunni in its religious composition.

The base of the population consists of people with a high intellectual background, whether it be politicians, artists, scholars and even sports figures. The name is a reference to Abū Ḥanīfah an-Nuʿmān, known as al-Imām al-Aʿẓam (Arabic: الإِمَـام الأَعـظَـم, "The Great Imam"), a renowned scholar and founder of the prominent Sunni Hanafī school of Islamic religious jurisprudence. Abu Hanifa Mosque is a prominent landmark, built around the tomb of Abū Ḥanīfah an-Nuʿmān.

== History ==
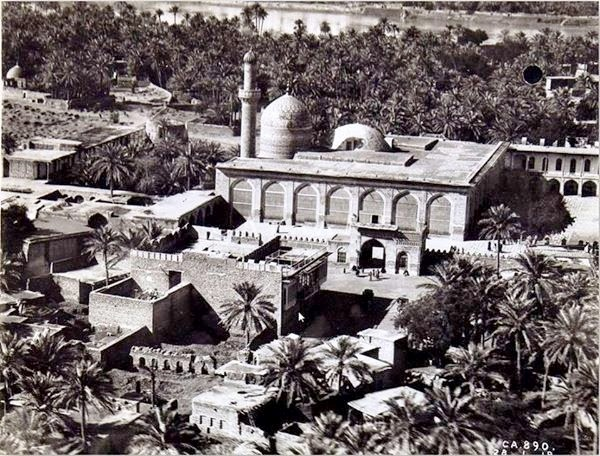
Abu Hanifa Mosque in 1919

Adhamiyah neighborhood dates back to the Abbasid period and is one of the oldest areas of Baghdad.

=== 2005 Al-Aaimmah bridge stampede ===
Although Adhamiyah has been the site of many clashes between Iraqi insurgents and US forces as well as tensions between Shi'ite security forces and Sunni residents, in September 2005, the residents of Adhamiyah were credited with saving hundreds of Shi'ite lives. Shi'ite pilgrims, who were caught in a crowd crush on Al-Aimmah Bridge, while coming from the opposing shore of Kadhimiyah, began jumping from the bridge in an attempt to escape the crush, only to face drowning in the Tigris below.

Adhamiyah residents dove into the waters, pulling hundreds of Shi'ites to the shore, where their fellow residents transported them to hospitals and mosques. In some cases, residents used mattresses from their own beds as makeshift stretchers. A teenage Sunni called "Othman Ali Abdul-Hafez" drowned while rescuing people. According to the Interior Ministry, upwards of 900 Shi'ite pilgrims died in the crush, with over 400 wounded.

=== Population movements ===
Shi'ite families forced out in 2006 post-Samarra fled to surrounding Shiite neighborhoods like Shaab. Sunni families displaced from these Shiite areas moved in. Many long-established Sunni residents went abroad and either locked their homes or arranged for trusted Sunni neighbors to guard them against displaced Sunni newcomers, fearing people who might break into the house and stay there. As of 2015, Adhamiyah remains one of the few majority Sunni districts in Baghdad.

=== Adhamiyah wall ===
On April 10, 2007, Coalition forces began to construct a 5-kilometre-long (3 mi), 3.7-metre-high (12 ft) wall around the Adhamiyah neighborhood in an attempt to reduce Sunni-Shi'a violence. Prime Minister Nouri al-Maliki called for a halt to construction on April 22, but it was finished anyway in May.

=== Summer 2007 onwards ===
By late fall 2007, life in Adhamiya had begun to resemble a city again with traffic jams, the reopening of shops, and an abatement of violence. Security efforts of the 2-319th AFAR 82nd Airborne Division, 3rd Squadron 7th Cavalry Regiment and cooperation of the local law enforcement and military. However, in January 2008 terrorists killed Col. Riyadh al-Samarrai, a founder of the Sunni Awakening Council, a new American ally, in Adhamiya at the offices of the Sunni Endowment. He was a close aide and security adviser to the leader of the Sunni Endowment, Sheikh Ahmed Abdul Ghafour al-Samarrai, who held Al Qaeda responsible.

== Infrastructure ==
Electricity has improved. Six or seven hours a day is the quota, although people still rely heavily on private generators. Americans guarded fuel convoys going through the wall until June 30, 2009, when they withdrew from the city pursuant to the security agreement with Iraq.

Garbage removal has improved. Americans are clearing rubble, and young Iraqis have been hired to pick up trash, but people often burn garbage at the huge trash dumps nearby, which is a nuisance for residents.

== Notable people ==
- Former-President of Iraq, Abdel Salam Aref
- Former-President of Iraq, Abdel-Rahman Aref
- Vice President Salih Mahdi Ammash
- Iraq scholar Huda Salih Mahdi Ammash
- Swimmer Othman al-Obaidi, who was killed during the 2005 incident.

== See also ==
- Islam in Iraq
- Kadhimiyah
- Meeting Resistance (2007), a documentary film about resistance fighters in Adhamiyah
