= Amil High School for Girls =

Iraqi school

Location
- Kadhimiyah, Baghdad; Iraq

Information
- Type: High school
- Enrollment: c.1000 (2007)
- Last updated: 5 April 2025

Amil High School for Girls is a high school in Kadhimiyah, Baghdad, Iraq. In February 2007 the school had over 1,000 students. The school admitted 135 new students in a period from November 2006 to February 2007.
