= Mubdar Hatim al-Dulaimi =

- مبدر حاتم الدليمي
- Born: January 2, 1951; Kingdom of Iraq
- Died: March 6, 2006 (aged 55); Baghdad, Iraq
- Military career
- Allegiance: Iraq
- Branch: Iraqi Army
- Rank: Major General
- Commands: 6th Division; Commander of all Iraqi Army Forces in Baghdad
- Conflicts: Iraq War • Iraqi Civil War

Major General Mubdar Hatim al-Dulaimi (Arabic: مبدر حاتم الدليمي) (January 2, 1951 – March 6, 2006) was an Iraqi army officer. While serving as the commander of all Iraqi Army forces in Baghdad, he was shot and killed by a sniper as he drove through western Baghdad, according to police sources.

As the commander of the 6th Division, among the first and biggest of Iraq's new army divisions formed by U.S. forces as part of their plans for eventual withdrawal, Dulaimi was among the most prominent officers in Iraq's security forces.

His troops were on the front line of efforts for the two weeks before his death to prevent further sectarian bloodshed in the wake of the Al Askari Mosque bombing. Iraqi leaders were concerned that further violence between Iraq's minority Sunnis and majority Shia Muslims could spark civil war.
