= Abu Hanifa Mosque =

Ancient Abbasid mosque in Baghdad, Iraq

- مسجد أبي حنيفة
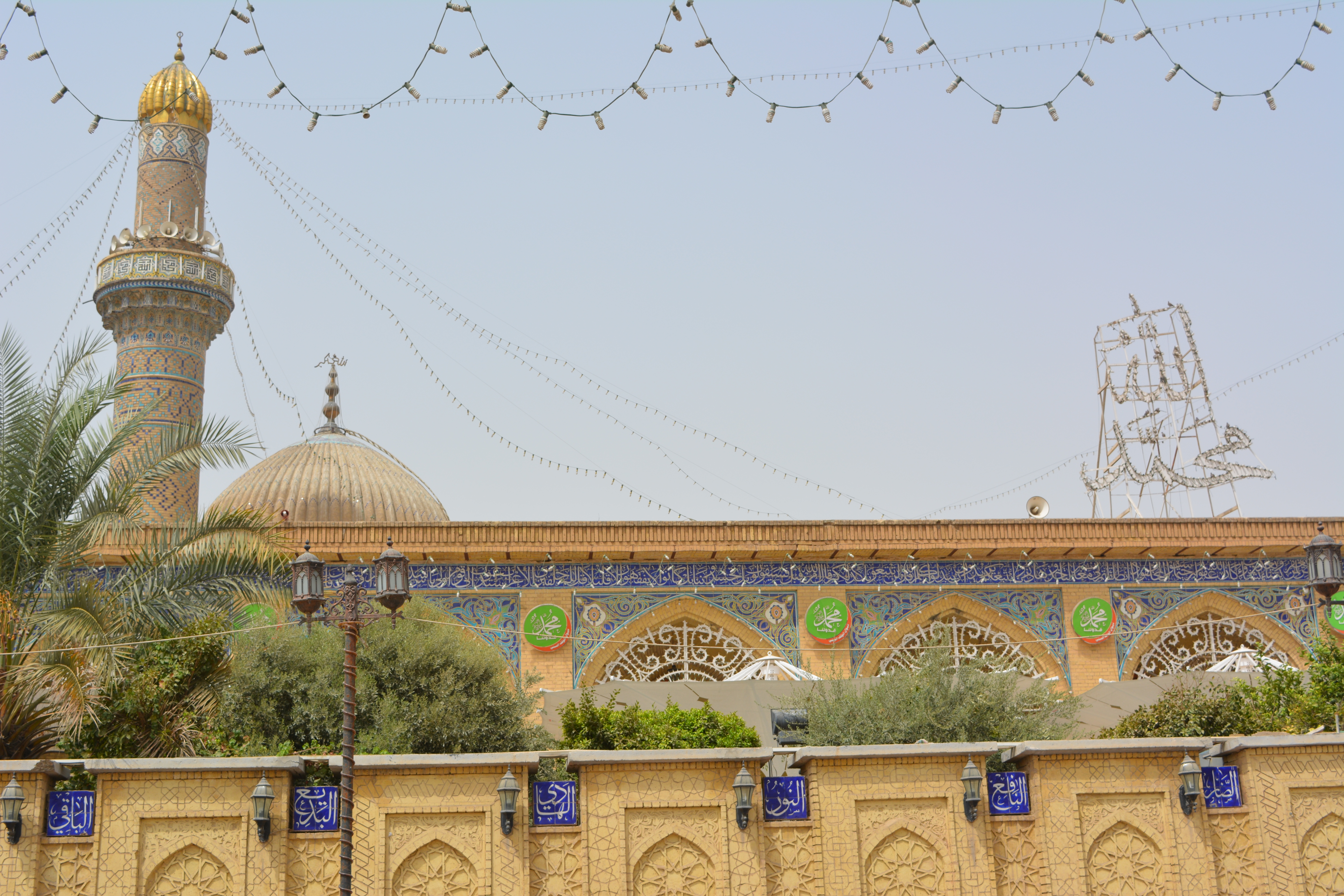
- The mosque's exterior

- Location of the mosque in Baghdad

Religion
- Affiliation: Sunni Islam
- Ecclesiastical or organizational status: Mosque and shrine
- Leadership: Sheikh Abd al-Sattar Abd al-Jabbar (Imam); Sheikh Ahmed Hassan al-Taha (Imam)
- Patron: Abu Hanifa
- Status: Active

Location
- Location: A'dhamiyya, Baghdad, Baghdad Governorate
- Country: Iraq
- Interactive map of Abu Hanifa Mosque
- Coordinates: 33°22′20″N 44°21′30″E

Architecture
- Type: Mosque architecture
- Style: Abbasid; Seljuk; Ottoman
- Founder: Samsam al-Dawla (AH 375); Abu Saad al-Khwarizmi or al-Mustawfi (AH 459)
- Completed: 375 AH (985/986 CE) (mosque); 459 AH (1066/1067 CE) (shrine); c. 1534 (reconstruction); c. 1638 (grand dome); 19th–early 20th century (upgrades); 1965 (clocktower, etc.); 2004 (rebuild)
- Destroyed: 1508 CE (by Safavids)

Specifications
- Capacity: 5,000 worshippers
- Interior area: 10,000 m^{2} (110,000 sq ft)
- Dome: Four
- Minaret: Two
- Minaret height: 35 m (115 ft)
- Spire: One: clocktower
- Shrine: One: Abū Ḥanīfa
- Materials: Marble; stone; plaster; gold; iron; aluminum

The Abu Hanifa Mosque (Arabic: مسجد أبي حنيفة, romanized: Masjid Abī Hanīfa), also known as the Grand Imam Mosque (Arabic: جامع الإمام الأعظم, romanized: Jāmi` al-imām al-aʿdham), is a Sunni mosque and shrine, located in the A'dhamiyya district of northern Baghdad, in the Baghdad Governorate of Iraq. The complex is one of the most prominent mosques in Baghdad, that is built around the tomb of Islamic scholar Abu Hanifa al-Nu'man, the founder of the Hanafi school, an Islamic school of Islamic religious jurisprudence.

Over the centuries, the complex has undergone many changes. Including demolishing by outside forces, reconstructions, and expansions. The mosque is located in the A'dhamiyya district, named after Abu Hanifa's reverential epithet al-imām al-aʿdham ("The Great Leader").

== Background ==
Caliph Abu Ja'far al-Mansur offered Abu Hanifa to be Qadi al-qudat, chief judge, but he refused, which caused him being tortured and put in prison. He was lashed 110 lashes until he agreed. Al-Mansur ordered Abu Hanifa to make fatwas that expand the caliph's authority, which Abu Hanifa disagreed to do, leading him back to prison.

While he was in prison, Abu Hanifa died in 150 AH / 767 CE in Baghdad, either from being poisoned or from old age. He was buried in al-Khayzuran Cemetery, named after al-Khayzuran bint Atta that was buried in it, 23 years after Abu Hanifa was. It was said that his funeral was attended by 50,000 people, and was attended by al-Mansur himself.

== History ==
=== Establishment ===
During the Buwayhid rule of the Abbasid Caliphate, in 375 AH (985/986 CE), a medium-sized mosque was built near Abu Hanifa's tomb, by the orders of Samsam al-Dawla. It was said that Abu Ja'far al-Zammam built a hall inside of the mosque in 379 AH.

=== Under the Seljuks ===
Later, in 459 AH / 1066 CE, the Grand Vizier of the Seljuk Emperor Alp Arslan, Abu Saad al-Khwarizmi or al-Mustawfi, built a shrine for Abu Hanifa in the mosque, along with a white Dome. Al-Khwarizmi also built a school near the mosque, named the Great Imam School, for teaching the Hanafi madhab. According to Ibn Khallikan, the school was opened on September 22, 1067, therefore, the Great Imam school is the first school in Baghdad. It took four months and a half to build the school (from January 8, 1067 to May 15, 1067).

The Amir [Abu Saad al-Khwarizmi] wanted to go back to the palace of the sultan, Alp Arslan. He went on Jamadi al-Akhira 27, 459 AH (May 15, 1067 CE). During his time in Baghdad, he built a great high dome on Abu Hanifa's tomb, and spent a lot of money on it. He built a malban and made it high, just like the shrines of the family of Ali ibn Abu Talib. He built a hallway for it and a nave, making it a big mosque. He built a school for the followers of Abu Hanifa and brought teachers for them and gave them much money to spend. He did a good job in that matter.

— Sibt ibn al-Jawzi, Mir'at al-zaman

While Khadija Arslan-Khatun, the sister of Sultan Alp Arslan, was visiting Baghdad in Jamadi al-Oula 459 AH, Abu Saad al-Mustawfi went there to welcome her. During his days in Baghdad, he built a shrine for Imam Abu Hanifa, made a malban for the shrine, built a dome, created a school for teaching Abu Hanifa's lectures and brought scholars to teach in it.

— Abu'l-Faraj ibn al-Jawzi, Al-Muntazam fi Tarikh al-Milouk w al-Umam

=== Under the Ottoman-Safavid Wars ===
After the invasion of Baghdad by the Safavid dynasty in 1508, Abu Hanifa mosque and school were destroyed and abolished, due to sectarian conflicts that the Safavids had. The Ottomans invaded Baghdad in 1534 and replaced the Shi'ite Safavid with the Sunni Ottoman rule. Sultan Suleiman the Magnificent first visited, after invading Iraq, Najaf and Karbala. And then, he visited the abolished mosque of Abu Hanifa and ordered to rebuild it and recover all the damages. Along with recovering the mosque, they also added new features to it, like a minaret, a hall, a bathroom, from 50 to 140 shops and the dome that they rebuilt was a dome that was never seen like it before. They also built a square fortress around the mosque and a watchtower. The fortress was armed with 150 soldiers with different military equipment.

=== Under Ottoman care ===
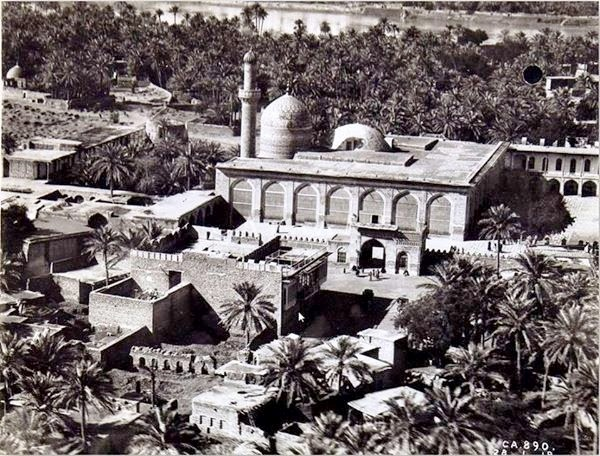
Abu Hanifa mosque in 1919

In 1638, the Ottomans recaptured Baghdad, after it was recaptured by the Safavids in 1623. Sultan Murad IV turned to al-A'dhamiyya and particularly, Abu Hanifa mosque, because it was the shrine of the Imam of the sultan's madhab. A luxurious dome was built on the mosque. He also brought some of the al-Ubaid tribe to live in houses around the mosque to protect it. The sultan ordered to renew the school and appointed employees to manage the school, along with allowing celebrations and holidays in the school. With the administration of Shaykh al-Islām Yahya, the sultan ordered to rebuild the buildings around the mosque and decorate it with strips of gold and silver, decorate the mosque with green wool drapes and expand the upper and lower gates. The mosque became at its greatest during the period of the rule of Sultan Murad IV.

In 1080 AH (1669/1670 CE), the brother of the vizier, Mohammed Bek Daftary, reconstructed old parts of the mosque and built a hallway in it. In 1090 AH (1679/1680 CE), Omar Pasha reconstructed the mosque and made its garden one of the most wonderful gardens in Baghdad.

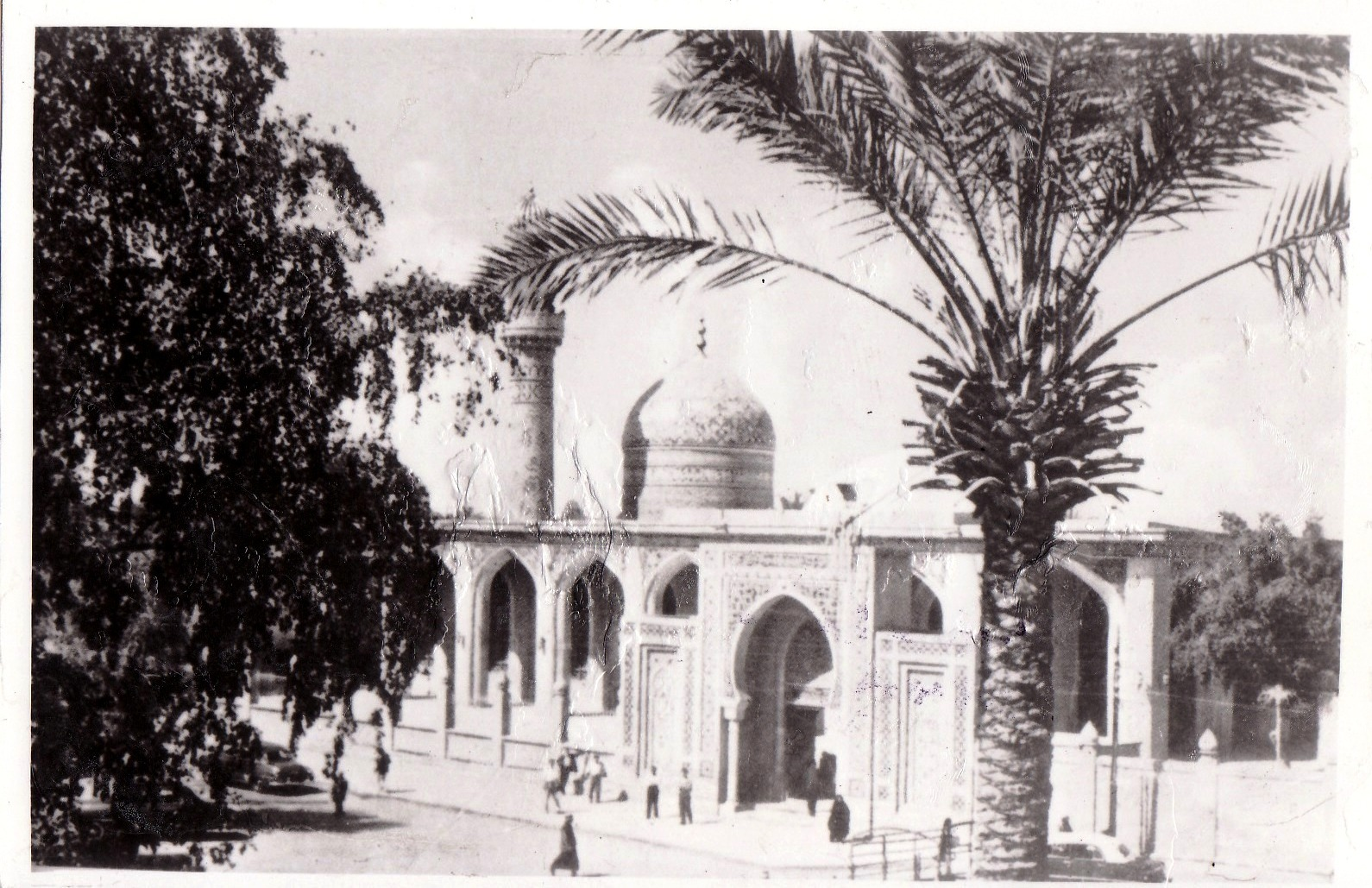
Abu Hanifa Mosque in 1950s

In 1757, during the rule of the Mamluk dynasty in Iraq, the Vali of Baghdad, Suleiman Abu Layla, renewed the shrine and built a dome and a minaret. In 1217 AH (1802/1803 CE), some of the mosque's constructions almost fell down, causing the destruction of some parts of the mosque, but Suleiman Pasha, rectified the matter and reconstructed the old buildings and painted the top of the minaret with gold. In 1255 AH (1839/1840 CE), Sultan Abdülmecid I ordered to reconstruct the old damaged parts of the mosque and decorate it with a tunic from Al-Masjid an-Nabawi, which was welcomed with superior greetings by the residents of Baghdad because of its holiness.

In 1288 AH (1871/1872 CE), the mother of Abdülaziz, Pertevniyal Sultan, vowed when she was sick, that if she got healed, she will rebuild the mosque with her own money, which she did after she got better. Sultan Abdulaziz ordered to form a committee that consisted of three employees in the mosque and the mayor of Adhamiyah. The cost of reconstructing the mosque was 80,000 liras. The committee made a construction map and gave it to the most popular engineer in Baghdad, Asit Karz, the map contained two hallways, several rooms from the south, east and north, a garden, a chapel, a big courtyard and a school for teaching Qur'an. The reconstructing lasted for five years.

=== Twentieth century ===
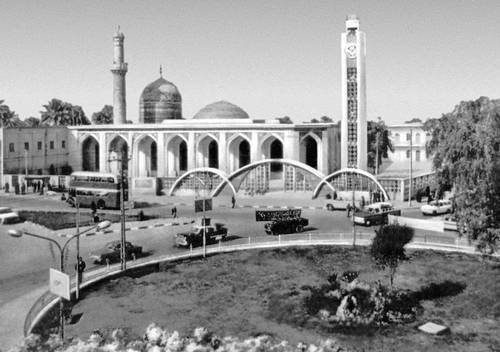
Abu Hanifa mosque during the 1960s.

In 1910, Sultan Abdul Hamid II ordered to reconstruct the mosque, renew the wall and build more rooms for students and poor people. These renovations costed 2,300 liras. There were several other reconstructions over the years. The most important ones were in 1918 and 1935, where the old rooms were replaced with bigger new rooms, and 1948, where they renewed the flooring and verses of Al-Fath was written on the walls of the hallways.

In 1959, after the 1958 Revolution, loads of upgrades were done on the mosque. The government gave the construction money to the engineer, Najmuddin Abdullah al-Jumaili. He started working in Ramadan 1379 AH (1959/1960 CE) with the construction lasting for five years. These upgrades included:

- The walls were lifted one meter of the ground from all the sides of the mosque and anti-moisturizes were put on it.
- Covering three meters of the walls of the main hall and hallways with Jordanian alabaster.
- Adding Andalusian ornaments to the mosque by Moroccan hands.
- Adding ornaments to the dome and covering its walls and ground with alabaster.
- Building a new luxurious platform and a new niche.
- Building half a hallway from the north-western side.
- Decorating the main hall and the hallways with modern lights.
- Building new rooms on top of the old rooms from the north-western side.
- Flooring the ground with mosaic floor.
- Rebuilding the whole outer wall and the main doors of the mosque.
- Building a tower, covered with blue and white mosaic and placing a big clock on it in 1961.
- Building bathrooms, ablution spots and a summer chapel.

=== During the Iraq War ===
On April 10, 2003, during the Battle of Baghdad, a four-hour fight took place between U.S. armed forces and Iraqi forces that were positioned inside the mosque. Parts of the domes, clock tower and the halls were destroyed. People who lived near the mosque cleaned the mosque from shattered glass and battle effects, along with protecting the mosque from those who threatened to steal antiquities. The Sunni endowment, with the corporation of several companies and families, rebuilt the destroyed parts of the mosque, until it was fully recovered in 2004. In 2006, missiles fired by a Katyusha rocket launcher fell into the mosque's courtyard without any damage to the mosque.

== Description and architecture ==
The total area of the mosque is 10,000 square metres (110,000 sq ft) and it can accommodate 5,000 worshipers. On Friday prayers, the regular number of worshipers is 1,000, while on the regular everyday prayers, 200-250 worshipers come to the mosque.

=== Main hall and hallways ===
The main hall is a great rectangular hall with an area of 578 square metres (6,220 sq ft). It consists of eight marble pillars with a large dome on top of them with iron chains hanging from them to hold the chandeliers, with three other domes built around it on three rectangular pillars made of stone and plaster. The dome of the main hall is decorated with small accurate trappings, just like the doors and pillars. The walls are also covered with Jordanian marble, three meters above the ground. The main hall contained two niches covered with geometric motifs with four pillars built around them, decorated with gorgeous trappings and writings of Surat al-Baqara.

The mosque had two hallways that surround the main hall, one from the east and another from the north, with an area of 800 square metres (8,600 sq ft) each. 26 domes are built on top of the hallways, based on 12 pillars. Between every one of them 4.5 metres (15 ft). There are three doors for the hallways, one from the side of the residential area and two from the side of the markets.

=== Tomb chamber ===
Located under the main dome, the tomb chamber is a wide room. Abu Hanifa is buried in the middle of the room, his grave covered by a wooden Zarih with metal bars.

Main elements of the mosque

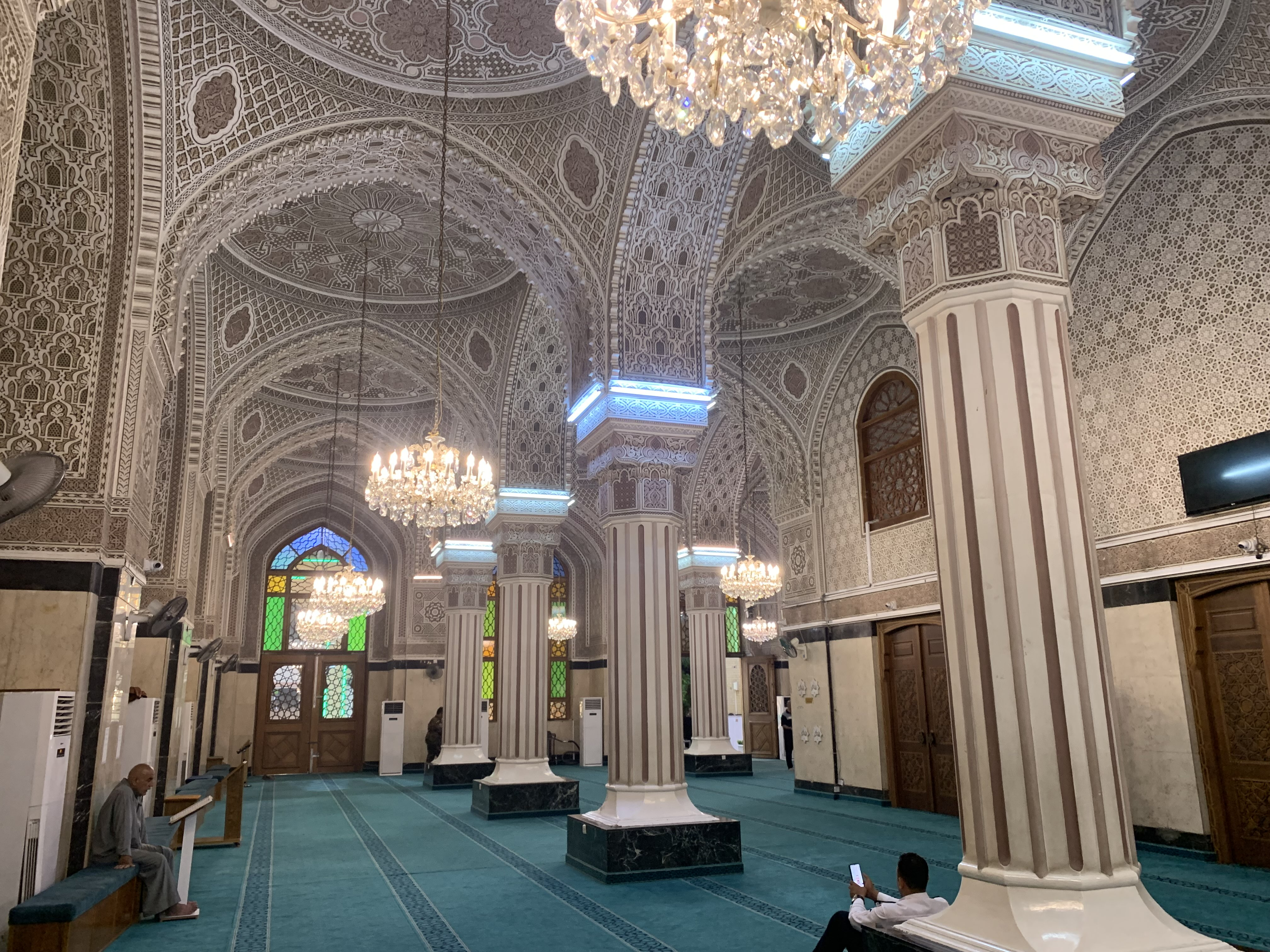
Prayer hall in front of one of the main entrances.

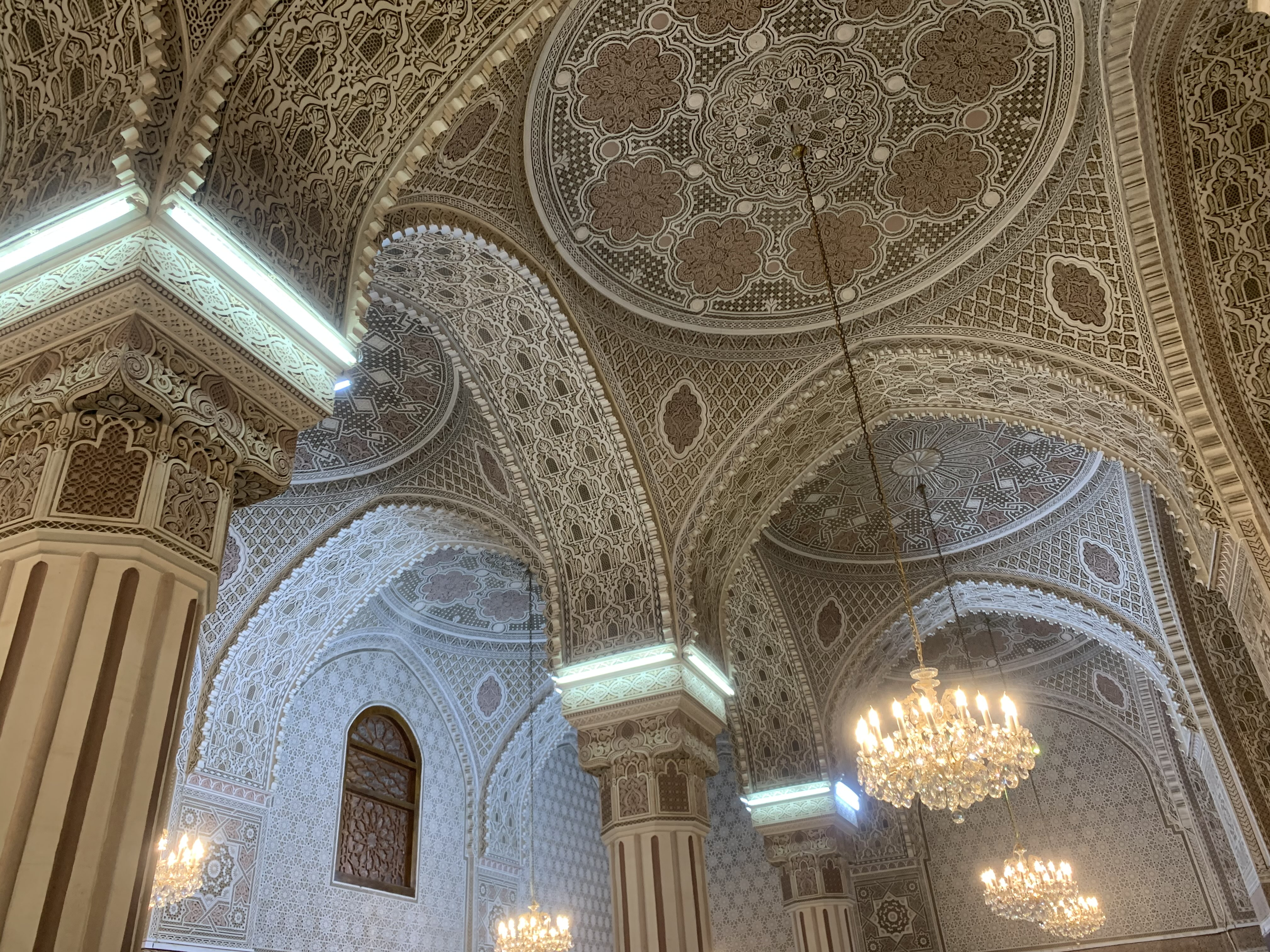
One of the many domed roofs of the prayer hallways built in hypostyle form.

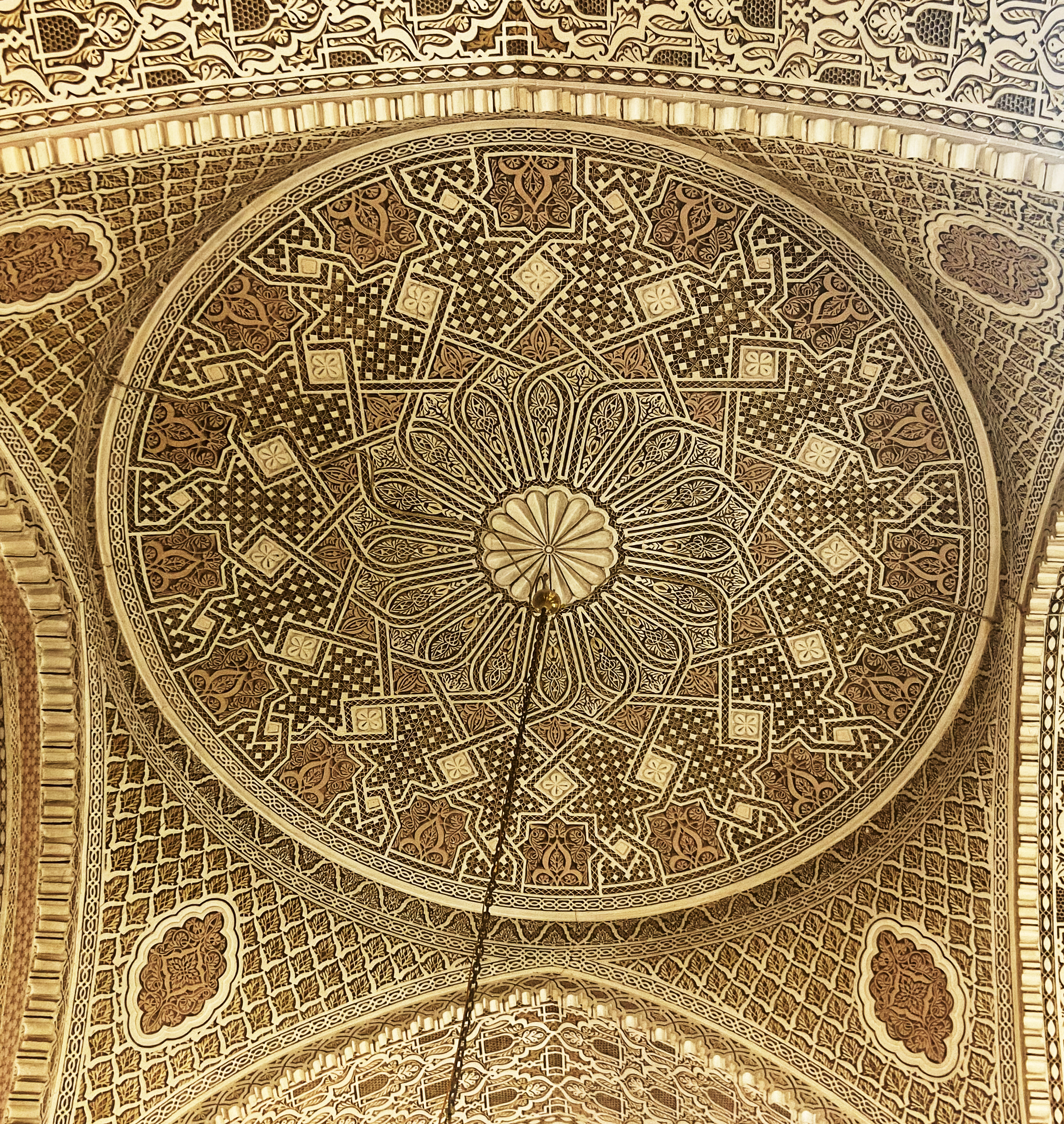
One of the dome intrados containing detailed decorations

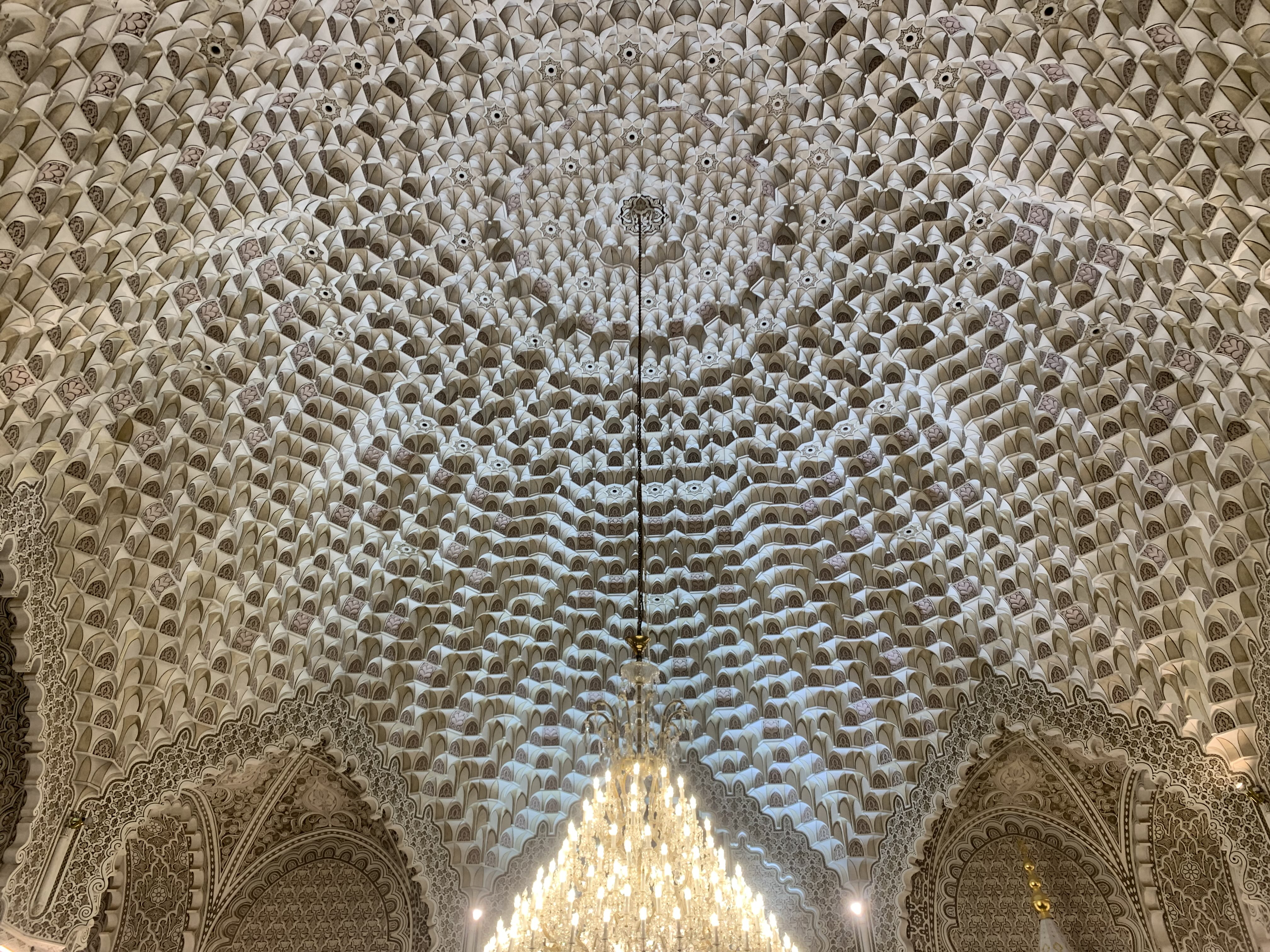
Interior of the main prayer hall topped by a dome intrados decorated with muqarnas.

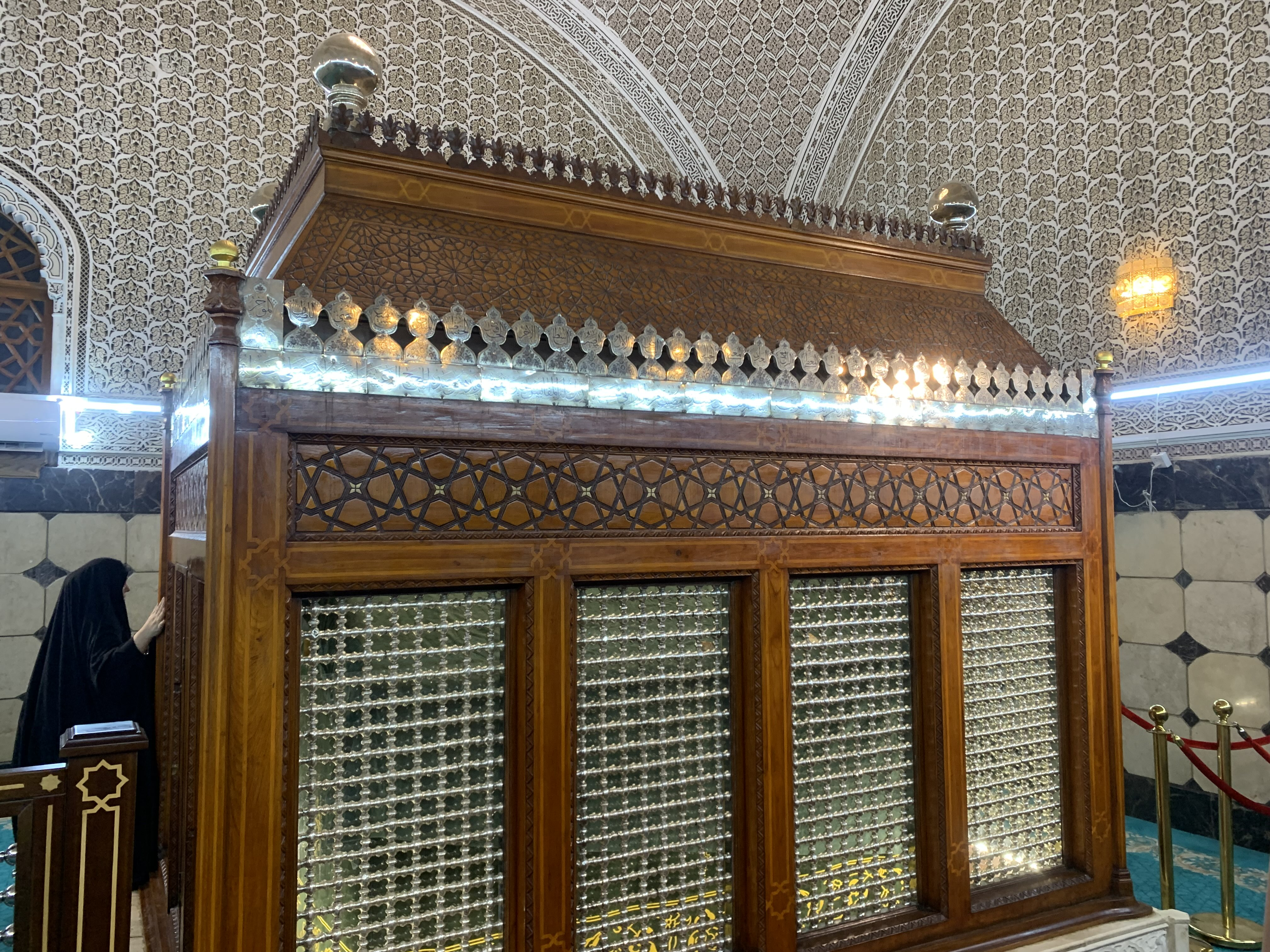
The Zarih of Abu Hanifa.

=== Clock tower ===
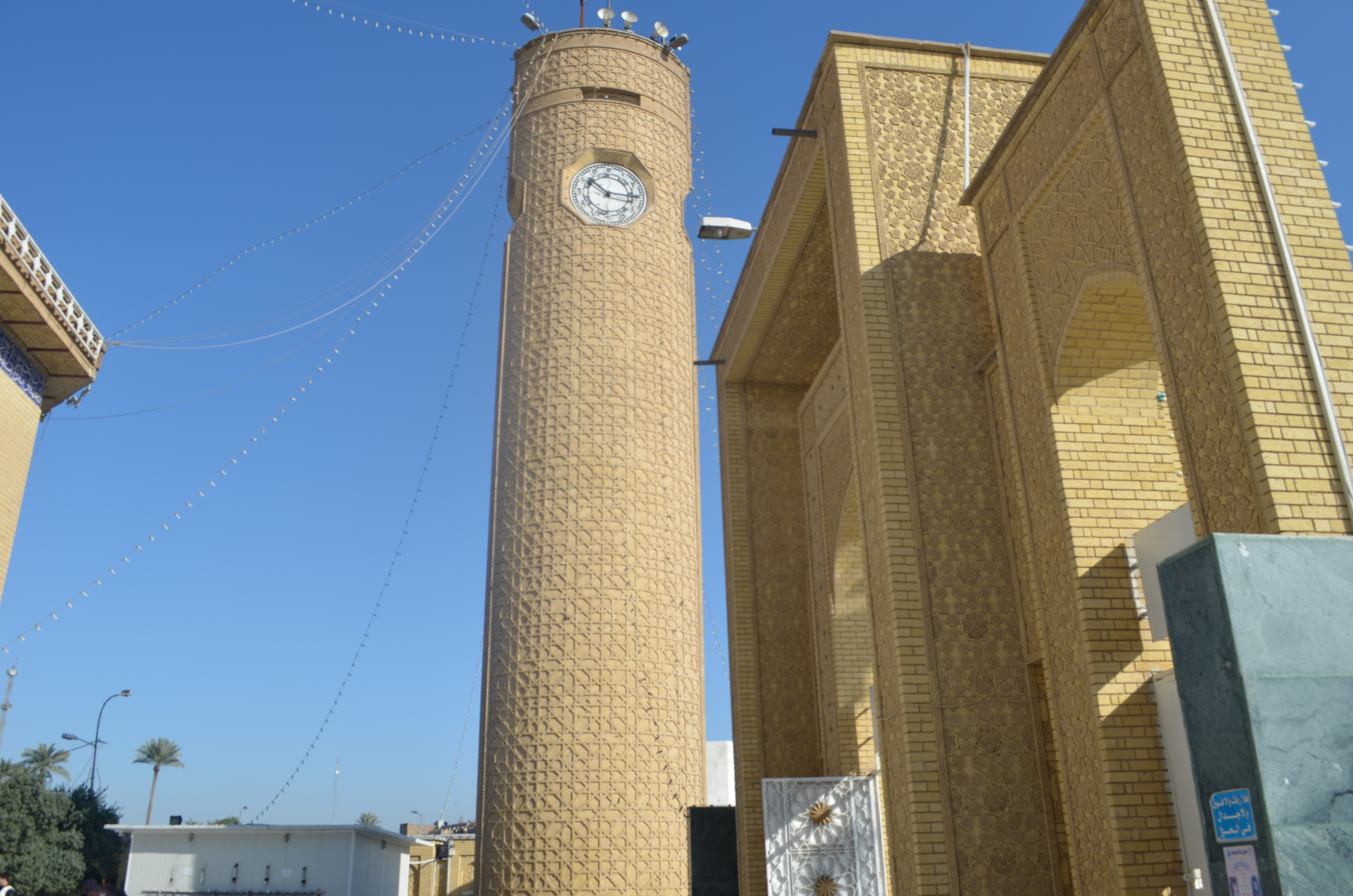
The mosque clock tower in 2014

In 1919, the big double-faced clock was given by the mosque of Abdul-Qadir Gilani to the Abu Hanifa mosque to fix it and place it in the mosque, but it was old and most of it was damaged. Abu Hanifa mosque published in the newspapers, on February 17, 1921, the need of a specialist to help fixing the clock, but no one responded. On March 17, 1921, Abdul Razzaq Mahsoob promised to check it and, if possible, fix it. After examining it, he found it very damaged and incapable to function, so he requested making another clock that looks like the old one from the Directorate of Religious Endowments. They accepted the request on March 24. On March 25, 1925, the work started on the clock in Mahsoob's house, where he made a four-faced clock with the help of his sons, Mohammed Rashid and Abd al-Hadi. It was completed on December 28, 1929, where Mahsoob gave it to the Directorate of Religious Endowments, but they did not take it, because they weren't sure of it. He hanged it on a high wall in house until October 10, 1932, where an exhibition was opened, where Mahsoob displayed the clock and got the first place for it. It stayed in the gardens of the exhibition until February 1933, where the directorate accepted the clock but didn't hang it because there was no tower. It stayed for 26 years in the directorate's stocks until 1961, where the tower was built and the clock was hanged. In 1973, the clock tower was covered with golden aluminum sheets.

== See also ==
- Al-Aimmah Bridge
- Islam in Iraq
- List of mosques in Iraq
