= Kadhimiya =

Kadhimiya ٱلْكَاظِمِيَّة ٱلْكَاظِمَيْن
- Neighbourhood
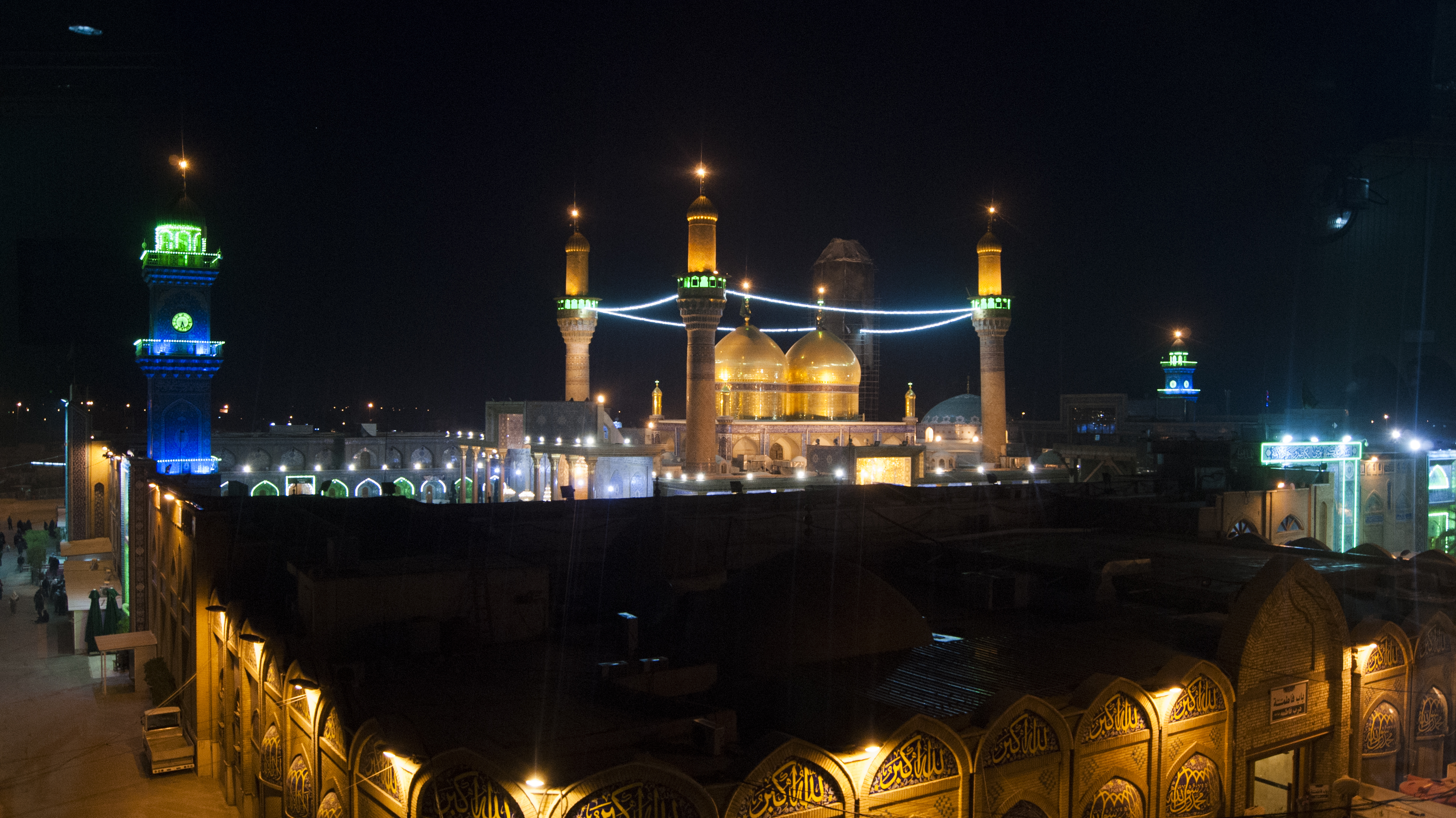
- View of the mosque and its environs

- Location within Baghdad Kāẓimiyyah's location inside Iraq
- Coordinates: 33°22′50″N 44°20′50″E
- Country: Iraq
- Governorate: Baghdad
- District: Kādhmiyyah

Area
  - Total: 28 km^{2} (11 sq mi)

Population (2013)
  - Total: 1,500,000
- Time zone: UTC+3 (AST)

Kadhimiya (Arabic: ٱلْكَاظِمِيَّة, pronounced [alˈkaːðˤɪmijːa]) or Kadhimayn (ٱلْكَاظِمَيْن) is a northern neighbourhood of the city of Baghdad, Iraq. It is about 5 kilometres (3.1 mi) from the city center, on the west bank of the Tigris. 'Kadhimiya' is also the name of one of nine administrative districts in Baghdad. As the place of the Kadhimiya Mosque, it is regarded as a holy city in Shia Islam.

The neighborhood is home to families of the upper-class aristocratic class, including the Al-Chalabi family, who historically governed Kadhimiya and administered the town's affairs between 1720 and 1865. In addition, some of its people worked in goldsmithing and trade. Before the 14 July Revolution, Kadhimiya was inhabited by members of the royal-era parliament. Some popular politicians and leaders, such as Muhammad Fadhel al-Jamali, were born in this city.

== History ==
=== Religious significance ===
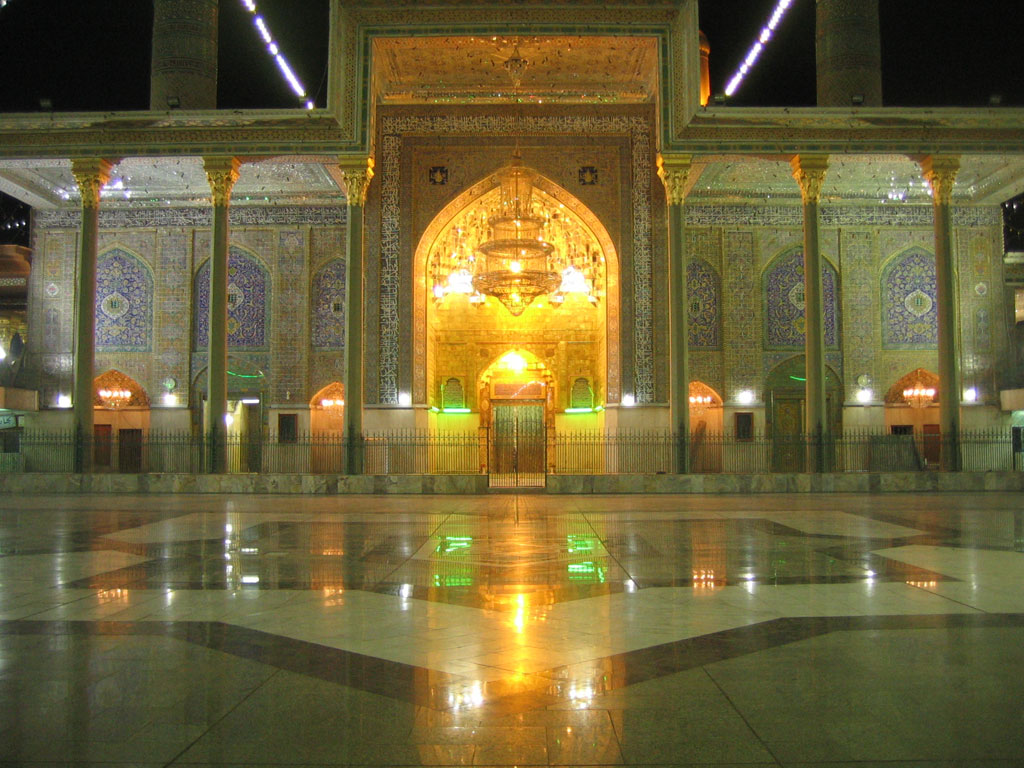
Al-Kadhimiya Mosque

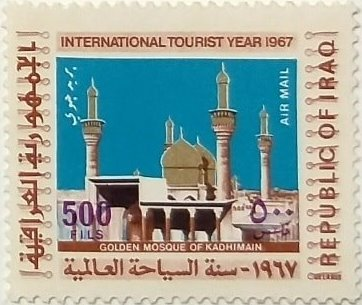
Stamp showing the neighbourhood

The Kāẓimayn ("Two who swallow their anger"), from whom the Mosque and area of Kadhimiyyah are named, are the Twelver Shia Imams Musa al-Kadhim and his grandson, Muhammad al-Jawad ibn Ali al-Ridha. The qubur (Arabic: قُبُوْر, graves) of the Kāẓimayn, and the scholars Mufid and Nasir al-Din al-Tusi, are within the premises of the Mosque. The area that now constitutes Al-Kāẓimiyyah was originally the location of a graveyard reserved for members of the Quraysh. This land was set aside for this purpose by the Abbasid caliph Harun al-Rashid. In its early history, the town was an important center of Shia learning, perhaps the main center, but over time, the town declined, and other cities rose to prominence.

The city's location has led to numerous plunderings, resulting in damage to its shrines at different times in history. Among the most damage ever experienced by the town was after the Mongol Siege of Baghdad (1258), where the shrine of the Shia Imams was burnt down.

During the Government of Midhat Pasha in the Ottoman Empire, a tramway was built between Baghdad and Kadhiyma to transport pilgrims to the Shia shrines. The tramway was in service until 1938, when bus service began operating.

=== Later history ===
Baha'u'llah lived in this section of Baghdad during His exile from Iran, famously dictating the Hidden Words on the banks of the Tigris River. This makes the city significant to the Baháʼí Faith.

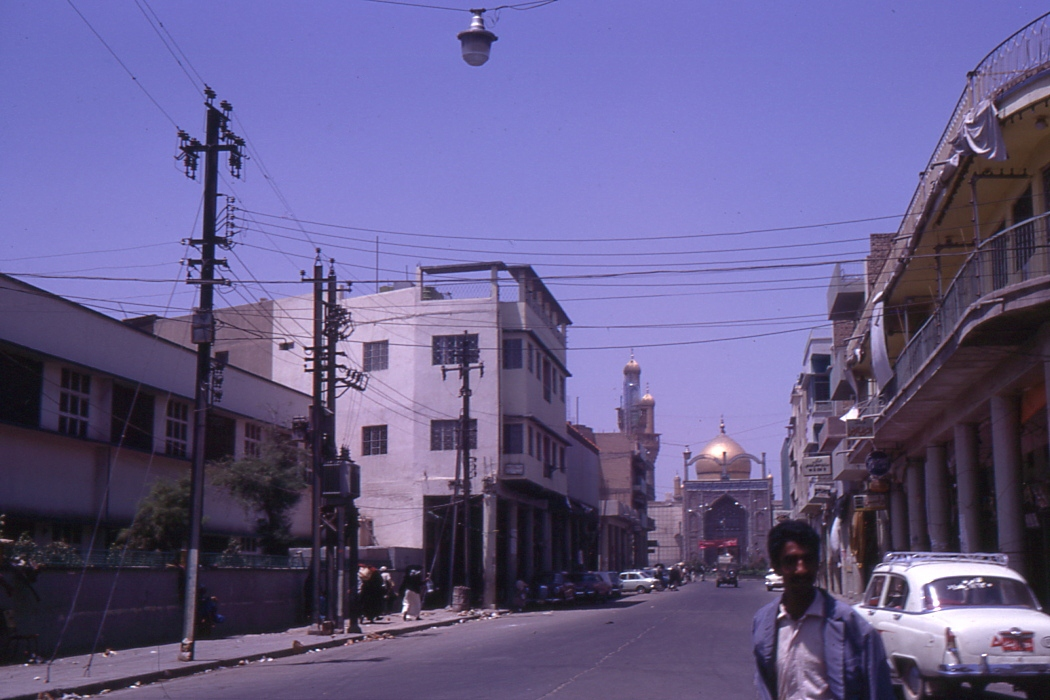
Kāẓimiyyah in the 1970's

The area was also an important center of Iraqi revolt against the British after World War I. The Al-Istrabadi family had friendly ties with members of the royal government, such as Nuri al-Said. In 1941, 13 people were killed, and more than 80 people were wounded in a demonstration against an attempt to demolish an old abandoned cemetery. During the 1958 coup by Abdul-Karim Qasim, when the government was toppled, Nuri al-Said sought refuge in the area. Muhammad Fadhel al-Jamali, who was from this neighborhood, also sought refuge. Later, they were captured.

In 2005, a stampede occurred on Al-Aimmah Bridge over the Tigris River. About 1000 people were killed. Iraqi officials executed Saddam Hussein at an American operated facility in al-Kāẓimiyyah known as "Camp Justice". The execution occurred on the occasion of Eid al-Adha, which attracted global widespread international criticism, even from Saddam's opponents.

Baghdad Security Plan: During Operation Imposing Law in 2007, there were rumours that the United States' forces built walls around Al-Kadhimiyya Mosque. According to Iraqslogger.com, the protests that resulted were due to an agreement between Iraqi security officials and the Mahdi Army (now called the Peace Companies) that US forces would not come within 1,000 metres (3,300 ft) of the shrine. Pilgrims to the shrine were attacked on 30 April 2016, leading to wider protests.

== Landmarks ==
=== Government and infrastructure ===
- Kadhimiyya Women's Prison is in the area. Women on Iraq's death row are held at the Shaaba Khamsa death row facility at Camp Justice. As of 2014, the adult women's death row had 36 women, as well as children, even though the facility was only intended to hold 25 women.
- Amil High School for Girls is in this neighborhood.

== See also ==
- Holiest sites in Shia Islam
- List of neighborhoods and districts in Baghdad
- List of places in Iraq
