= Al-Aimmah Bridge =

Bridge across the Tigris River in Baghdad, Iraq

Al-Aimmah Bridge جسر الأئمة
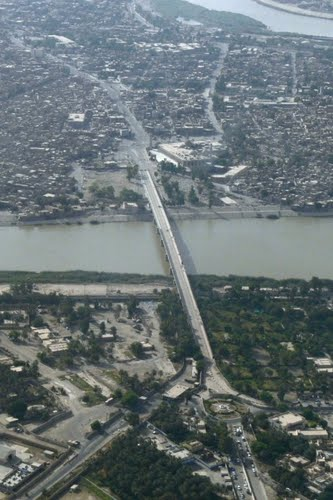
- Al-Aimmah Bridge in 2017
- Coordinates: 33.375122°N 44.355540°E
- Crosses: Tigris River
- Locale: Adhamiyah and Kadhimiya, Baghdad, Iraq
- Maintained by: Iraq Ministry of Housing and Construction

Characteristics
- Design: cable-stayed
- Total length: 370 metres (1,210 ft)
- Width: 21 metres (69 ft)
- Height: 55.7 metres (183 ft)
- Longest span: 182.5 metres (599 ft)
- No. of spans: 4

History
- Construction start: 1980
- Construction end: 1983

Location
- Interactive map of Al-Aimmah Bridge

Al-Aimmah Bridge (Arabic: جسر الأئمة, romanized: Jisr al-'Ā'immah, lit. 'Bridge of the Imams') is a bridge over the river Tigris in the Iraqi capital of Baghdad. The bridge links the areas of Adhamiyah, which is a majority Sunni Arab area, from its east bank, with the Shi'te area of Kadhimiya on its west. Adhamiyah is where the mosque of Sunni Imam Abu Hanifah is located. Kadhimiya is where the Mosque of Shi'ite Imams Musa al-Kadhim and Muhammad al-Jawad is located.

== History ==
It was the place of a deadly stampede on the 31st of August 2005, when hundreds of Shiite pilgrims were crushed. The stampede caused the railings to give way, allowing hundreds to fall to their deaths in the river. There was also a Sunni casualty, that is Othman Ali Abdul-Hafez, who had drowned after trying to save people in the water. The bridge had been closed for the three months prior to the incident.

Although Adhamiyah has been the site of many clashes between Iraqi insurgents and US forces as well as tensions between Shia security forces and Sunni residents, in September 2005, the residents of Adhamiyah were credited with saving hundreds of Shia lives. Shia pilgrims who were caught in a stampede on Al-Aimmah bridge, coming from the opposing shore of Kadhimiya, began jumping from the bridge in an attempt to escape the crush, only to face drowning in the Tigris below. Adhamiyah residents dived into the waters, pulling hundreds of Shias to the shore, where their fellow residents transported them to hospitals and mosques, in some cases using the mattresses from their own beds as makeshift stretchers.

The bridge was reopened on November 11, 2008.

== See also ==
- Islam in Iraq
- Mesopotamia
