= 2005 Al-Aimmah Bridge disaster =

2005 crowd crush in Iraq

Al-Aimmah Bridge disaster
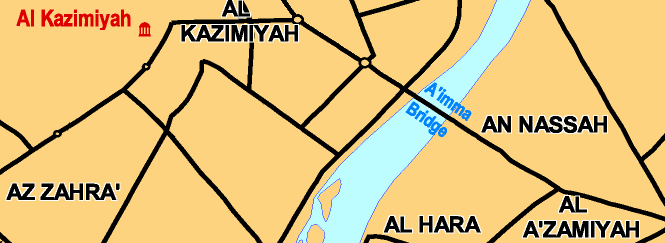
- Pilgrims crossed east from Al Kazimiyah (Al Kadimiyah) over A'imma (Al-Aimmah) bridge
- Date: August 31, 2005
- Location: Al-Aimmah Bridge, Baghdad, Iraq; 33.374898°N 44.355208°E
- Type: Crowd crush, bridge collapse
- Deaths: 965

The Al-Aimmah Bridge disaster (Arabic: كارثة جسر الائمة, lit. 'Bridge of the Imams disaster') occurred on August 31, 2005 when 965 people died following a panic, and subsequent crowd crush, on the Al-Aaimmah Bridge, which crosses the Tigris river in the Iraqi capital of Baghdad.

The incident was "the single biggest loss of Iraqi life since the US-led invasion in 2003".

== Incident ==
At the time of the disaster, around one million pilgrims had gathered around or were marching toward Al Kadhimiya Mosque, the shrine of the Shi'ite Imam Musa al-Kazim. Tensions had been high within the crowd. Earlier in the day, seven people had been killed and dozens more wounded in a mortar attack upon the assembled crowd for which an Al-Qaeda-linked insurgent group claimed responsibility. Near the shrine, rumors of an imminent suicide bomb attack broke out, panicking many pilgrims. Interior Minister Bayan Baqir Solagh said that one person "pointed a finger at another person saying that he was carrying explosives...and that led to the panic". The man was presumed to be wearing a suicide explosive belt on the bridge.

The panicked crowd flocked to the bridge, which had been closed. Somehow, the gate at their end of the bridge opened, and the pilgrims rushed through. Some people fell onto the concrete base and died instantly. The ensuing crush of people caused many to suffocate. The pressure of the crowd caused the bridge's iron railings to give way, dropping hundreds of people 9 m (30 feet) into the Tigris river. There was nowhere on the bridge for the people to go, as the other end of the bridge remained closed, and was impossible to open anyway, as it opened inward.

=== Attempts to rescue people ===
People dived in from both ends of the bridge trying to help those drowning in the river. On the Sunni side, calls went out from the loudspeakers of local mosques to help those in trouble. A Sunni Arab teenager, Othman Ali Abdul-Hafez (Arabic: عُـثْـمَـان عَـلِي عَـبْـدُ الْـحَـافِـظ, ‘Uthmān ‘Alī ‘Abdul-Ḥāfiẓ), succumbed to exhaustion and drowned as he rescued people in the water. He was later praised as a "martyr" by Iraqi politicians.

== Aftermath ==
A three-day mourning period was announced by Iraqi Prime Minister Ibrahim al-Jaafari. Iraqi President Jalal Talabani said the catastrophe "will leave a scar in our souls and will be remembered with those who died in the result of terror acts." Many of the dead were buried in the holy Shia Islamic city of Najaf.

There was some political fallout also from the event, with Mutalib Mohammad Ali, the Minister for Health, blaming the defence ministers for not doing enough to secure the area. However, the prime minister dismissed any calls for resignation for any ministry.

After the disaster, a few commentators in the Western media speculated that given the scale of the incident it might tip the country into a civil war by antagonizing the Shi'a community. However, there was no immediate surge in sectarian violence. Opposition groups blamed the government and security forces for failing to prevent the incident. However, these groups themselves often encourage high turn-outs at religious events to prove the relative strength of their sect. The high turn-out at Shia religious events was also due to the fact that they were banned under Saddam Hussein, and many attended to express faith in a way which was denied to them for decades.

== World reaction ==
Governments and world leaders offered their condolences after the catastrophe:

- (Ba'athist Syria) Syrian Foreign ministry official quoted by state news agency Sana:

"The Syrian government and people express their sympathy to Iraqis and to the families of the victims, and they wait for the day when security, stability and progress reign in the country."

- Iran Foreign Ministry spokesman Hamid Reza Asefi:

"[Iran offers its] condolences and sympathy with the Iraqi people and government. Suspicious hands are involved in conspiracies to incite violence and bloodshed among the different Iraqi groups and tribes so that they disturb the security and calm of the Iraqi people"

- (United Kingdom) UK Foreign Secretary Jack Straw, speaking on behalf of the EU and the UK – holder of the EU presidency:

"It is still not clear exactly what started the stampede which led to these hundreds of deaths and injuries. However, it is clear that the same crowd of Shia pilgrims, celebrating an important Shia religious festival, had earlier suffered a mortar attack... I condemn utterly this despicable act of terrorism against innocent civilians just as I condemn, too, those that continue to use violence and terror more widely in order to further their aims in Iraq. The depravity of these individuals who commit these acts of terrorism against their fellow Muslims sadly knows no bounds."

- United States Department of State spokesman Sean McCormack:

"The United States deeply regrets the tragic loss of life of worshipers in Kadhimiya, Baghdad today... Our sincere condolences and thoughts and prayers go out to the many Iraqi families who lost loved ones in this tragedy." The stampede received relatively little attention in the U.S. media because it occurred just two days after Hurricane Katrina struck the Gulf Coast, the aftermath of which continued to dominate headlines.

- Amr Mussa, Arab League Secretary General:

"[We need a] redoubling of Arab efforts to support the Iraqi people in their sad hour."

- Pakistan President Pervez Musharraf:

"It is with most profound sadness and grief that I had learnt about the death of hundreds of pilgrims in Baghdad."

- (United Nations) UN spokeswoman Marie Okabe:

"The secretary general has learned with great sadness of the human tragedy that took place today in Baghdad."

== See also ==
- List of fatal crowd crushes
- Karbala stampede
