= List of coalition military operations of the Iraq War =

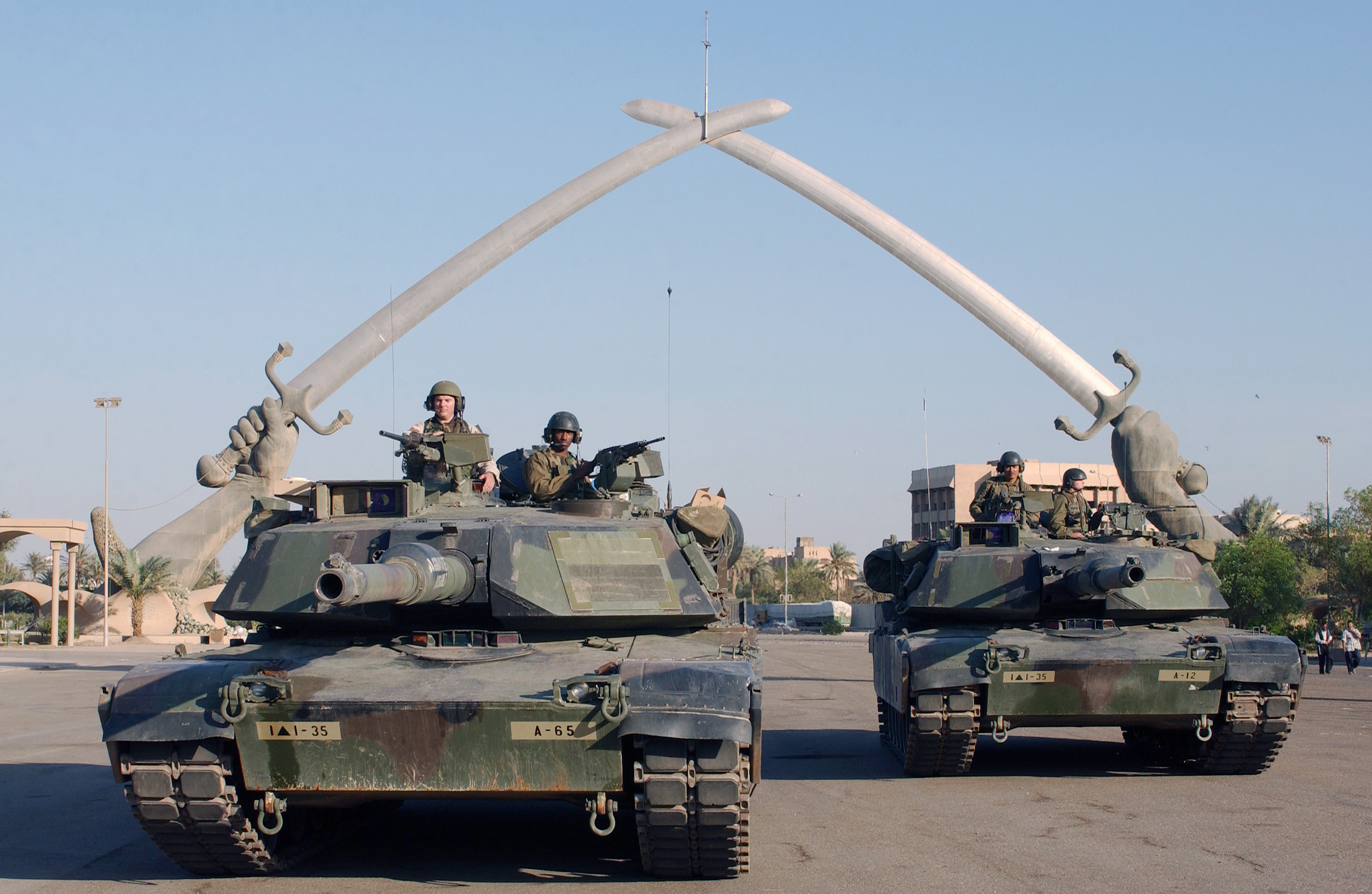
M1A1 Abrams are posed for a photo under the "Hands of Victory" in Ceremony Square, Baghdad, Iraq.

This is a list of coalition military operations of the Iraq War, undertaken by Multi-National Force – Iraq. The list covers operations from 2003 until December 2011. For later operations, see American-led intervention in Iraq (2014–2021).

== 2003 ==
Though the initial war lasted for only 26 days, the coalition soon found themselves fighting insurgent forces. Upon completion of the initial conflict the coalition troops began counterinsurgency, humanitarian, security, and various other types of operations to stabilize the country.

| Battle/Operation name | From date | To date | Location | Purpose/Result |
|---|---|---|---|---|
| Operation Iraqi Freedom | 19 March 2003 | 31 August 2010 | Iraq | U.S. invasion in Iraq. Planned to end with the withdrawal of U.S. combat troops, and succeeded by Operation New Dawn (see 2010 below). |
| Operation Bastille | September 2002 | March 2003 | Throughout Iraq | Forward Presence: Was the code name for the operation to deploy force elements and prepare for possible combat operations in Iraq |
| Objective Buford | March 2003 | March 2003 | Bashur, near the city of | Security: Set up a perimeter and traffic checkpoints around an airfield, which has a runway 6,700 feet (2,000 m). |
| Battle of Umm Qasr | 21 March 2003 | 25 March 2003 | Umm Qasr | Battle: Was the first military confrontation in the Second Iraq War. |
| Battle of Nasiriyah | 23 March 2003 | 29 March 2003 | Nasiriyah | Battle: During the fighting 18 marines and 11 soldiers were killed and about 50 were wounded, while the Iraqi resistance was neutralized fairly rapidly thereafter. |
| Operation Northern Delay | 26 March 2003 | 26 March 2003 | Bashur Airfield | Security: Forced the Iraqi Army to maintain approximately six divisions in the area to protect its northern flank, providing strategic relief for Coalition Forces advancing on Baghdad. Also may have been associated with the name "Operation Option North" whose objective was to seize the city of Kirkuk, the northern oil fields and several military airfields in the area. |
| Battle of Baghdad | 3 April 2003 | 12 April 2003 | Baghdad | Battle: The invasion of the city commenced three days after Allied forces had secured the Baghdad airport |
| Battle of Debecka Pass | 6 April 2003 | 6 April 2003 | Debecka Pass | Battle: To secure a major crossroads near the village of Debecka |
| Operation Airborne Dragon | 7 April 2003 | 7 April 2003 | Bashur Airfield, northern Iraq | Contingency: Marked the beginning of the first expeditionary insertion of a U.S. armored force into combat by air. |
| Operation Planet X | 15 May 2003 | 15 May 2003 | A village near Ad Dawr and Al Dur, 11 mi (18 km) north of Tikrit | Contingency: American raid to capture Ba'athists |
| Operation Peninsula Strike | 9 June 2003 | 13 June 2003 | Balad | Contingency: American raid to capture Ba'athists. |
| Operation Desert Snowplough | 12 June 2003 | 3 August 2007 | Al-Qurna district North of Basra | Contingency: Codename for Danish operations under British command. |
| Operation Desert Scorpion | 15 June 2003 | 29 June 2003 | Fallujah, from Kirkuk in the north to Taji in the south | Contingency: American raid to capture Ba'athists. (included a number of lesser operations such as Scorpion Sting, Spartan Scorpion and Rifles Scorpion) |
| Operation Spartan Scorpion | 15 June 2003 | 16 June 2003 | Throughout Iraq | Contingency: Consisted of nationwide raids designed to remove all remaining Ba'ath Party, non-compliant forces and paramilitary forces |
| Operation Scorpion Sting | 16 June 2003 | 16 June 2003 | the Thawra neighborhood of Baghdad | Contingency: Coalition soldiers found and confiscated three pistols, one rifle, two mortar rounds and detained 31 suspected criminals |
| Operation Sidewinder | 29 June 2003 | 7 July 2003 | a city about 20 kilometers east of al-Taji | Contingency: Raids against suspected Hussein supporters. Was designed in support of Operation Desert Scorpion. It involved the 4th Infantry Division, who were tasked with securing highways. |
| Operation Iron Bullet | July 2003 | July 2003 | Baghdad | Security: Was designed to collect dangerous ordnance and transport it out of the city where it can be safely handled or destroyed |
| Operation Tyr | July 2003 | July 2003 | Tikrit | Security: Destroyed a series of stationary targets without risk of civilian casualties but with high visibility. Was an assault conducted by the 4th Infantry Division in Tikrit, primarily as a show of force to deter terrorist and anti-coalition forces. The 1st Battalion, 44th Air Defense Artillery Regiment destroyed a series of stationary targets without risk of civilian casualties but with high visibility. Troops also destroyed Iraqi tanks using high explosive munitions. No one was reported injured in the operation. |
| Operation Ivy Serpent | 12 July 2003 | 21 July 2003 | a region along Highway 1 between the cities of Bayji, Huwayiah and Samarra | Counterinsurgency: Was a preemptive strike focused aggressively on non-compliant forces and former regime leaders who are planning attacks against coalition forces in an attempt to hinder coalition and Iraqi efforts in building a new Iraq. Was an American anti-insurgent sweep in Sallahadin and Diala provinces. It was conducted concurrently with Operation Soda Mountain. The operation was centered on a section of Highway 1 north of Baghdad near the towns of Bayji, Huwayiah, and Samarra. The American action was based on the Fourth Infantry Division whose insignia is ivy. This is a play on the Roman numeral "IV". |
| Operation Soda Mountain | 12 July 2003 | 17 July 2003 | throughout Iraq | Counterinsurgency: To increase reconnaissance and presence throughout the whole of Iraq to deter, disrupt and rapidly defeat attacks on coalition forces. Was a nationwide sweep by American and Coalition Forces against insurgents and remnants of the former regime conducted from 12 to 17 June 2003. As a result of this series of almost 150 raids, 62 Ba'athist leaders were captured and a large number of weapons seized. Simultaneously, humanitarian missions such as repairing and rebuilding public buildings were conducted. Conducted roughly concurrently with Operation Ivy Serpent. |
| Operation White House | 16 July 2003 | 16 July 2003 | Baghdad | Counterinsurgency: Troops of the 101st Airborne Division stormed the residence of Samir Abd Al-Aziz Al-Najim, the central Baath Party chairman for Baghdad |
| Operation Tapeworm | 22 July 2003 | 22 July 2003 | Mosul | Security and counterinsurgency: killing of Uday and Qusay Hussein, Saddam Hussein's sons |
| Operation Ivy Lightning | 12 August 2003 | 12 August 2003 | Baghdad, Ain Lalin and Quara Tapa along the Jabal Hamrin Ridge north of the city | Counterinsurgency: A number of small weapons stores were uncovered. Was a raid conducted by elements of the U.S. 4th Infantry Division. A number of small weapons stores were uncovered. The names of many operations of the 4th Infantry Division took the name "Ivy", a pun on the Roman numeral "IV." |
| Operation Silverado | 16 August 2003 | 16 August 2003 | Subak Sur | Counterinsurgency: To capture suspected insurgents and seize weapons stockpiles. Was a small operation conducted by the 39th Infantry Brigade (Light) (Separate/Enhanced) of the Arkansas National Guard in Subak Sur. |
| Operation Ivy Needle | 26 August 2003 | 26 August 2003 | Khalis, in and near; 70 kilometers north of Baghdad | Counterinsurgency: Was a raid conducted by elements of the 4th Infantry Division in and near Khalis, seventy kilometers north of Baghdad, on 26 August 2003. The operation disrupted a criminal gang active in the area. |
| Operation Longstreet | September 2003 | September 2003 | between Baghdad and Fallujah | Counterinsurgency: Numerous weapons stores were destroyed and enemy personnel taken into custody without the loss of a single American life. Was a two-week series of raids and cordon operations conducted by elements of the First Armored Division and the 3d Armored Cavalry Regiment, as well as 2nd Armored Cavalry Regiment (United States). Numerous weapons stores were destroyed and enemy personnel taken into custody without the loss of a single American life. The operation was named after a Confederate General James Longstreet. |
| Operation Desert Thrust | October 2003 | October 2003 | throughout Iraq | Counterinsurgency: Was the name given by 1st Brigade, 1st Infantry Division to their operations in Iraq beginning on their arrival in October 2003 |
| Operation Chamberlain | October 2003 | October 2003 | Sinjar, the border southwest of | Security and Surveillance: Was an American border-security operation mentioned in press releases on 15 October 2003. It involved ground surveillance Joint Surveillance Target Attack Radar System (JSTARS) aircraft to feed information to ground elements of the 101st Airborne Division in near–real time. The Ukrainian 5th Detached Mechanized Brigade was also involved in the operation. This operation was named after US general Joshua Chamberlain. |
| Operation Industrial Sweep | October 2003 | October 2003 | Samarra | Counterinsurgency: Was a search of parts of the city of Samarra by elements of the 4th Infantry Division during Post-invasion Iraq. |
| Operation Tiger Clean Sweep | 7 October 2003 | 7 October 2003 | | Security and Counterinsurgency: : Was a border security operation conducted by the "Tiger" Squadron of the 3d Armored Cavalry Regiment announced on 7 September 2003, near Al Qa'im. The town was cordoned off and searched, yielding a number of small arms and fourteen persons suspected of being insurgents. |
| Operation Sweeny | 15 October 2003 | 15 October 2003 | southern Iraq | Law enforcement: Anti-smuggling operation by the Marines. Elements of the 13th Marine Expeditionary Unit (MEU) Special Operations Capable(SOC)completed humanitarian assistance, anti-smuggling and security and stabilization operations, 25 October in southern Iraq as part of Operation Sweeney. The MEU SOC, a component of Expeditionary Strike Group One(ESG), composed mostly of Marines stationed with the 1st Marine Division of Marine Corps Base Camp Pendleton, California, provided medical and dental capability and produced more than 3,000 US gallons (11,000 L) of water for citizens in the region. |
| Operation O.K. Corral | 19 October 2003 | October 2003 | Ar Ramadi | Counterinsurgency: Was a sweep operation conducted by elements of the 82nd Airborne Division in Ar Ramadi beginning on 19 October 2003. Over ninety people were detained, including four senior officers of the former Iraqi Army. |
| Operation Abalone | 31 October 2003 | 31 October 2003 | Ramadi | Members of A Squadron 22 SAS, assaulted three compounds/dwellings on the outskirts of Ramadi where US intelligence had tracked a Sudanese jihadist who was facilitating Islamist militants into Iraq. The SAS were supported by Delta Force and a platoon of US Bradley IFV's. |
| Operation Eagle Curtain | November 2003 | November 2003 | northern Iraq | Security and Counterinsurgency: Troops participated in 311 patrols, four cordon and knock operations, and eventually detained eight individuals. Was a series of raids and roadblocks conducted by the 101st Airborne Division. Eight persons were detained as suspected insurgents associated with the former government. The name is derived from the "Screaming Eagles" nickname for the 101st Airborne Division. |
| Operation All American Tiger | 6 November 2003 | 2003 | | Counterinsurgency: Was an operation with an objective of capturing insurgents associated with the old regime. At least a dozen prisoners were taken, several of whom were on the American "Most Wanted" list. The first phase was launched by the 1st Squadron, 3rd Armored Cavalry Regiment and the 1st Battalion, 504th Parachute Infantry Regiment, 82nd Airborne Division. This operation was designed to target those who suspected of attacking Coalition forces. At least 12 men were detained and some were targeted suspects including Abd Hamad Salah, Huri Mukhlif, Al Ani, Ahmed Kadar Hamad, Faleeh Mahessn, Thair Muklaf Hamadi, and Mohamed Hinde Saeel. The name of the operation is derived from the nickname ("All American") for the 82nd Airborne Division. |
| Operation Rifle Sweep | 6 November 2003 | 6 November 2003 | the Iraq-Syria border | Counterinsurgency: Focused on the search and seizure of weapons and munitions |
| Operation Ivy Cyclone | 7 November 2003 | November 2003 | Tikrit | Counterinsurgency: Was designed to locate and detain or eliminate persons seeking to harm coalition forces or Iraqi civilians. The operation was executed by the 4th Infantry Division. On 7 November, an American helicopter was forced down near the city, and the next day heavy air and artillery strikes supported a number of military operations in the area. |
| Operation Boothill | 10 November 2003 | 10 November 2003 | Ar Ramadi | Counterinsurgency: Was designed to clear and secure the roads outside the city and to seize any contraband weapons. |
| Operation Iron Hammer (Matraqa Hadidia) | 12 November 2003 | 2003 | Baghdad | Security and Counterinsurgency: Was a joint operation between the US Army, US Air Force and Iraqi Civil Defense Corps with the objective of preventing the staging of weapons by anti-coalition forces, and preemptively destroy enemy operating bases and fighters in Baghdad |
| Operation Ivy Cyclone II | 17 November 2003 | 2003 | Tikrit, near | Counterinsurgency: American operation near Tikrit |
| Operation Rifles Blitz | 20 November 2003 | 2003 | Al Qaim | Security: Was a house-to-house search of the Iraqi Syria-frontier border region close to Syria, Jordan and Saudi Arabia, led by the 3d Armored Cavalry Regiment. Involved troops from the 82nd Airborne Division and the 101st Airborne Division. (US News, 12 August 2003, Iraq Hack: A Reporter's Blog, 11 December 2003) |
| Operation Rifle Sweep | 26 November 2003 | 26 November 2003 | along the Iraq-Syria border | Counterinsurgency: Focused on the search and seizure of weapons and munitions |
| Operation Bayonet Lightning | 2 December 2003 | 2 December 2003 | Al Hawija and the village of Rashad, 60 km (37 mi) to the south of Kirkuk | Counterinsurgency: Designed to capture weapons, materials, and people that posed a threat against Coalition Forces. 1,200 soldiers from the 173rd Airborne Brigade, the 4th Infantry Division, and Iraqi military participated. They located and confiscated sixty-two AK-47 assault rifles, two hundred rounds of AK-47 ammunition, one rocket propelled grenade launcher and two improvised explosive device-making kits. Twenty six individuals were captured, including three targeted individuals, Saad Mohammed ad-Douri, the private secretary of Izzat Ibrahim ad-Douri, and Hamid Saad, a senior official of the Ba'ath Party. |
| Operation Bulldog Mammoth | 4 December 2003 | 4 December 2003 | Baghdad, northwest of | Security: A brigade-sized cordon and search of an Abu Ghurayb apartment complex. The operation lasted about five-and-a-half hours and involved approximately 1,450 soldiers. It was led by the US Army's 3rd Brigade, 1st Armored Div., and was supported by the US Army's 82nd Airborne Division, 325th Airborne Infantry Regiment, more than 300 Iraqi Civil Defense Corps personnel and an Estonian army platoon. The cordon and search went through 2,400 apartments, 53 additional buildings and seized hundreds of rifles and other weapons. The soldiers detained 40 personnel, including three on a by-name "black" list of suspects who were caught in the outer cordon while trying to escape the area. |
| Operation Clear Area | 6 December 2003 | 6 December 2003 | Central Iraq, between Ar Rifa'i and Qal'at Sukkar | Counterinsurgency: Was a search and seizure operation utilizing vehicle check points |
| Operation Abilene | 8 December 2003 | 8 December 2003 | Al Anbar province | Counterinsurgency: Soldiers initiated 12 raids that resulted in the capture of 12 individuals and a number of various weapons. Was conducted by the US Army's 1st Infantry Division, 1st Brigade. The operation consisted of twelve raids to capture or eliminate individuals responsible for attacking coalition forces. The operation was successful and resulted in the capture of 12 personnel and the confiscation of various weapons. |
| Operation Panther Squeeze | 10 December 2003 | 10 December 2003 | Latifiya | Counterinsurgency: Was a series of 18 night-time raids by elements of the 82nd Airborne Division. These raids seem to have been in response to an ambush that killed seven Spanish intelligence officers in November. About forty enemy personnel were captured. |
| Operation Red Dawn | 13 December 2003 | 13 December 2003 | ad-Dawr | Security and counterinsurgency: American capture of Saddam Hussein. |
| Operation Panther Backroads | 15 December 2003 | 15 December 2003 | Ar Ramadi | Law enforcement and counterinsurgency: Was an attempt to stop insurgent smuggling. Was launched by the 82nd Airborne Division in the Sunni Triangle in an attempt to stop insurgent smuggling. |
| Operation Arrowhead Blizzard | 17 December 2003 | 17 December 2003 | Samarra | Counterinsurgency: Seven targets classified as high-value were captured by the 4th Infantry Division and the 3rd Brigade, 2nd Infantry Division in the Sunni Triangle. |
| Operation Ivy Blizzard | 17 December 2003 | 17 December 2003 | Samarra | Counterinsurgency: Counterinsurgency sweep by US forces. Launched just days after the capture of Saddam Hussein, which led some to believe that information that led to the operation may have come from Saddam. |
| Operation Iron Justice | 18 December 2003 | 18 December 2003 | Baghdad, southern portion | Law enforcement: Captured 28 fuel trucks and nine propane trucks illegally dispensing fuel as part of black market activity. Was a U.S. Army operation aimed at ending insurgent run Black Market fueling activities south of the city. It involved the 1st Armored Division and 82nd Airborne Division. |
| Operation Rifles Fury | 21 December 2003 | December 2003 | Fallujah | Counterinsurgency: Seizure of weapons caches including 204 RPGs. Was a coalition strike at insurgent training camps in the Rawah area. Led by the 3d Armored Cavalry Regiment along with soldiers from the 82nd Airborne Division and 4th Infantry Division. The operation was nicknamed by the soldiers involved as Operation Santa's Claws. |
| Operation Devil Siphon | 23 December 2003 | 23 December 2003 | Ar Ramadi | Law enforcement: Was aimed at curtailing the growing black market of fuel and propane and restoring Iraq's fuel infrastructure. Like Operation Rifles Fury, this operation was a coalition strike aimed at ending Black Market fuel and propane operations run by insurgent marketeers. The operation involved the U.S. 1st Infantry Division and Iraqi Police. |
| Operation Overcoat | 23 December 2003 | 23 December 2003 | Mosul | Humanitarian: Delivered more than 500 pounds of coats, clothes, shoes, and toys |
| Operation Salm | 23 December 2003 | 23 December 2003 | Fallujah | Operation Salm was designed to give a higher profile to coalition forces in Fallujah and more exposure to residents. The second objective was to paralyze anti-coalition forces by flooding the streets with soldiers and checkpoints. This operation took place on 23 December 2003, and lasted from 5:30 am to 3:00 pm. Members of the 10th Mountain Division and 82nd Airborne Division participated and reported they detained 12 enemy personnel. |
| Operation Santa Strike | 23 December 2003 | 23 December 2003 | Mosul | Humanitarian: Delivered more than 500 pounds of coats, clothes, shoes, and toys |
| Operation Iron Force | 24 December 2003 | 2003 | Baghdad | Counterinsurgency: The objective was to capture or eliminate any rebel forces seeking to capitalize on the holiday season to attack coalition forces |
| Operation Iron Grip | 24 December 2003 | 31 December 2003, at least | Baghdad | Counterinsurgency: Was designed to intensify the pressure on Saddam loyalists |
| Operation Choke Hold | 30 December 2003 | 30 December 2003 | Baghdad | Counterinsurgency: To stop the influx of bomb making materials into the city |

== 2004 ==
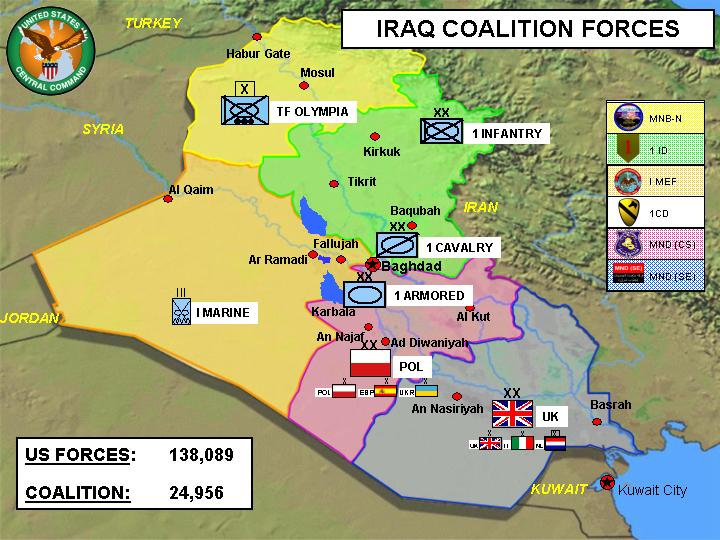
Areas of responsibility in Iraq as of 30 April 2004

During the early occupation, a number of widely cited humanitarian, tactical, and political errors by coalition planners, particularly the United States and United Kingdom led to a growing armed resistance, usually called the "Iraqi insurgency" (referred to by the mainstream media and coalition governments). The anti-occupation/anti-coalition forces are believed to be predominantly, but not exclusively, Iraqi Sunni Muslim Arabs, plus some foreign Arab and Muslim fighters, some of the latter tied to al-Qaeda. Several minor coalition members have pulled out of Iraq; this has been widely considered a political success for the anti-occupation forces.

Despite this, there was a reduction in violence throughout Iraq in the start of 2004 due to reorganization within the insurgent forces. During this time the tactics used by coalition forces were studied and the insurgency began to plan a new strategy. The calm did not last long however and once the insurgency had regained its footing attacks resumed and increased. Throughout the remainder of 2004 and continuing into the present day, the insurgency has employed bombings as their primary means of combating the coalition forces. This has led to hundreds of Iraqi civilians and police killed in addition to the coalition forces they were fighting. Many were killed in a series of massive bombings at mosques and shrines throughout Iraq. The bombings indicated that as the relevance of Saddam Hussein and his followers was diminishing, radical Islamists, both foreign and Iraqi was increasing to take their place. An organized Sunni insurgency, with deep roots and both nationalist and Islamist motivations, was becoming clear. The Mahdi Army also began launching attacks on coalition targets and to seize control from the Iraqi security forces. The southern and central portions of Iraq began to erupt in urban guerilla combat as coalition forces attempted to keep control and prepared for a counteroffensive.

In response to insurgent attacks, coalition forces focused on hunting down the remaining leaders of the former regime, culminating in the shooting deaths of Saddam's two sons in July. In all, over 200 top leaders of the former regime were killed or captured, as well as supports and military personnel during the summer of 2004.

| Battle/Operation name | From date | To date | Location | Purpose/Result |
|---|---|---|---|---|
| Operation Gimlet Victory | 2004 | 2004 | | |
| Operation Hickory View | 2004 | 2004 | | Counterinsurgency and Security: Helped eliminate many of the established indirect fire patterns, which insurgents had used in the past |
| Operation I CAN | 2004 | 2004 | throughout Iraq | Humanitarian: Soldiers distributed over 100 boxes of donated school supplies and toys to Iraqi children. |
| Operation Iron Fury II | 2004 | 2004 | Sadr City | Counterinsurgency: Continued missions to drive the Mahdi Army out of the city. |
| Operation Lancer Lightning | 2004 | 2004 | | |
| Operation Windy City | 2004 | 2004 | Baghdad | Humanitarian: Gave blankets to distribute to the local population. |
| Operation Warhorse Whirlwind | January 2004 | January 2004 | Abu Kharma | Counterinsurgency: Captured 31 individuals, including eight who were specifically targeted for suspected involvement in anti-Coalition activities. |
| Operation Iron Resolve | 12 January 2004 | 2004 | Baghdad | Counterinsurgency: An attempt to disrupt insurgent networks with constant searches and raids by coalition forces. |
| Operation Clothes for Kids | 13 January 2004 | 14 January 2004 | Taji | Humanitarian: An effort to bring supplies of clothing to Iraqi children. |
| Operation Market Sweep | 13 January 2004 | 13 January 2004 | Fallujah | Counterinsurgency: A successful raid into the downtown arms market of Fallujah. |
| Operation Saloon | 14 January 2004 | 14 January 2004 | the Al-Anbar province | Counterinsurgency: Captured a high-ranking former Iraqi Officer named General Mamoud Khudair Younes. |
| Operation Centaur Fast Gas | 15 January 2004 | 19 January 2004 | Ba'qubah | Security: Provide security for the Ba'qubah gas station, help manage the lines in order to facilitate maximum efficiency of the station, and prevent unauthorized gas pilferage. |
| Operation Rock Slide | 15 January 2004 | 15 January 2004 | the Al-Anbar province | Counterinsurgency: Captured a high-ranking former Iraqi officer named Brig. Gen. Kalil Ibraham Fayal al-Dulaymi. |
| Operation Wolfhound Trap II | 21 January 2004 | 23 January 2004 | Heychel | Counterinsurgency: |
| Operation Wolfhound Fury II | 22 January 2004 | 22 January 2004 | Heychel and its surrounding villages | Counterinsurgency: Hunted down suspected terrorists and provided humanitarian and reconstruction assistance to the Iraqi people. |
| Operation Wolverine Feast | 24 January 2004 | 24 January 2004 | the Al-Doura district | Counterinsurgency: Coalition and Iraqi Army soldiers detained 10 suspected insurgents and seized four supply caches. |
| Operation Final Cut | 28 January 2004 | February 2004 | Bayji | Counterinsurgency: Was intended to capture or eliminate people suspected of insurgent activity. |
| Operation Aston | February 2004 | February 2004 | Baghdad | Members of B Squadron 22 SAS, assaulted a house in southern Baghdad that MI6 intelligence showed was part of a 'jihadist pipeline' from Iran to Iraq that American and British intelligence agencies were tracking suspects on and these suspects fell in with a jihadist group. Two jihadists were killed and two more captured. |
| Operation Saber Turner II | February 2004 | February 2004 | | Counterinsurgency: |
| Operation Tomahawk (Iraq) | February 2004 | February 2004 | | |
| Operation Trailblazer | 9 February 2004 | 2004 | Baqubah | Security: An effort to make Iraqi roads safer for fellow soldiers. The beginning of this operation was conducted by the 14th Engineer Battalion (C)(W) and the 244th Engineers out of Colorado. This Operation was taken over by the 141st Engineer Combat Battalion (C)(W), a North Dakota National Guard unit. Their mission was to patrol a section of Iraq's main highways and alternate routes locating and clearing bombs. The secondary goal of this mission was route sanitation which included knocking down trees in the medians of the roads and clearing brush from the sides of the road where the enemy could easily hide a bomb. In January 2005, the 141st Engineers were replaced by the 467th Engineer Battalion (C)(W), a USAR unit from Tennessee. The 14th Engineer Battalion returned to Iraq and relieved the 467th Engineers of the Trailblazer mission in December 2005. Alpha Company, 164th Engineers from North Dakota took over operations from the 467th Engineers in the LSA Anaconda/Balad area around the same time. In October 2006, the 14th Engineers were replaced by the 1st Engineer Battalion. |
| Operation Eagle Liberty 3 | 18 February 2004 | 19 February 2004 | Bilad | Counterinsurgency: Targeted individuals who were suspected of attacking forward operating bases in the area. 16 targets and 3 enemy personnel were detained. |
| Operation Devil Clinch | 21 February 2004 | 21 February 2004 | Baghdad | Counterinsurgency: A series of raids meant to capture suspected insurgents. |
| Operation Rocketman | 26 February 2004 | 26 February 2004 | the town of Siniyah | Counterinsurgency: Three suspected insurgents believed to be responsible for attacks on coalition forces were arrested. |
| Operation Aloha | March 2004 | March 2004 | Kirkuk | Counterinsurgency: Elements of the 25th Infantry Division surrounded an area in late March 2004 and sent patrols to conduct searches for weapons. Soldiers knocked on doors to ask permission to search home, signalling a change from earlier more-aggressive techniques. The name of the operation is a traditional Hawaiian greeting. The 25th Infantry Division has long been based in that state. |
| Operation Centaur Rodeo | March 2004 | March 2004 | Baqubah | Law enforcement and Counterinsurgency: Designed to slow the smuggling of illegal weapons in Baqubah's Diyala Governorate capital. As of 30 March 2004 coalition forces had seized 3 people and several weapons. |
| Operation Devil Thrust | March 2004 | March 2004 | | Surveillance, reconnaissance and Counterinsurgency: The operation consists of three phases. The first phase was surveillance and reconnaissance, the 2nd was combat operations and the 3rd was stabiliztion of the region. |
| Operation Soccer Ball | March 2004 | March 2004 | Baghdad, Karadah district | Humanitarian: Gave away 150 soccer balls to local children. |
| Operation Warrior | 3 March 2004 | 3 March 2004 | | Security and Counterinsurgency: Was a cordon and search operation conducted by coalition forces designed to capture Farhan and Sofi Sinjar, Abu Akmed, and Abu Farka. |
| Operation Shillelagh | 17 March 2004 | 17 March 2004 | Abu Ghurayb | Counterinsurgency: Seven wanted individuals were found and detained during a sweep of more than 700 houses. See Also Operation Iron Promise. |
| Operation Suicide Kings | 17 March 2004 | 17 March 2004 | Baghdad | Security: A combined cordon and search operation involving U.S. and Iraqi Civil Defense Corps Soldiers. |
| Operation Iron Promise | 18 March 2004 | November 2004 | Baghdad | Counterinsurgency: Part of a campaign to bring stabilization and security to the country and people of Iraq. Was a long-running series of patrols conducted by elements of the 1st Armored and 1st Cavalry Divisions. The operation continued until at least November 2004 when it was still being mentioned in newspaper reports. The name is derived from the "Old Ironsides" nickname of the 1st Armored Division. |
| Operation Duke Fortitude | April 2004 | April 2004 | Fallujah | Counterinsurgency: The operation was designed to disrupt or destroy elements of the Mahdi army and Muqtada Al-Sadr insurgencies. |
| Operation Iron Saber | April 2004 | June 2004 | Najaf, Al Kut and Karbala | Counterinsurgency: Was a coalition strike aimed at defeating the Mahdi army and Muqtada al-Sadr. |
| Operation Lancer Fury | April 2004 | April 2004 | Baghdad, Sadr City | Counterinsurgency: Was one of many operations initiated in hopes of disarming and disbanding hostile militia forces. |
| Battle of Fallujah(2004) | 4 April 2004 | 1 May 2004 | Fallujah | Battle: (See Operation Vigilant Resolve) |
| Operation Vigilant Resolve | 4 April 2004 | 1 May 2004 | Fallujah | Battle: First American attempt to capture Fallujah. |
| Battle of Ramadi | 6 April 2004 | 10 April 2004 | Ramadi | Battle: An estimated 250 rebels were killed in fighting that shattered the insurgent offensive |
| Operation Resolute Sword | 8 April 2004 | 8 April 2004 | | Counterinsurgency: Was a military operation taken by the United States' armed forces to capture Muqtada al-Sadr. (10 April President's Radio Address Mention) |
| Operation Danger Fortitude | 11 April 2004 | 17 April 2004 | Najaf, about 20 km northwest of | Security: was designed establish and occupy FOB Duke |
| Operation Ripper Sweep | 12 April 2004 | April 2004 | Fallujah | Security and counterinsurgency: The operation aimed at securing roads into and out of the city. Was a United States Marine Corps operation that took place as Operation Vigilant Resolve raged in Fallujah. The operation aimed at securing roads into and out of Fallujah and was led by the 7th Marine Regiment. The Marines swept west to east from Al Asad and seized a large number of bombs. |
| Battle of Husaybah | 17 April 2004 | 17 April 2004 | Husaybah | Battle: Five Marines were killed along with 150 insurgents in the fierce battle that lasted 14 hours. Another 9 marines were wounded and 20 insurgents captured. |
| Operation Yellow Stone | 23 April 2004 | 23 April 2004 | Al-Rashida, the former presidential island retreat | Counterinsurgency: To secure the area and remove the enemy from the island |
| Operation Rapier Thrust | May 2004 | May 2004 | | |
| Operation Spring Cleanup | May 2004 | May 2004 | Baqouba | Counterinsurgency: Designed to take control of a stretch of road known as the Blue Babe Highway and included the U.S. 3rd Brigade Combat Teams. The area was also known as "RPG Alley" for the large number of roadside bombings and insurgent attacks that occurred there. |
| Operation Thunderstruck | May 2004 | May 2004 | | |
| Operation Striker Hurricane | 1 May 2004 | 1 May 2004 | Baghdad | Counterinsurgency: To round up insurgents and other anti-coalition parties |
| Operation Wolfpack Crunch | 4 May 2004 | 4 May 2004 | Diwaniya | Counterinsurgency: The mission's target was a series of buildings, located near an old downtown theater, which were reportedly being used by members of the "Muqtada's Militia" to plan and stage attacks against Coalition forces |
| Operation Arrowhead Strike 10 | 5 May 2004 | 6 May 2007 | Baghdad, the southwestern Rashid District | Counterinsurgency: To rid the Rashid District of terrorists and criminals and to protect the population |
| Operation Student to Student | 10 May 2004 | 10 May 2004 | Al-Baruddi | Humanitarian and Peacekeeping: Gave the soldiers and the local populace an opportunity to establish the relationships that are so critical to the building of a sovereign Iraq |
| Operation Disarm | 19 May 2004 | 19 May 2004 | Baghdad | Peacekeeping: The program used funds earmarked for tips leading to the capture of insurgents or illegal weapons and offers up to $500 per weapon, depending on type. Included in the final tally were more than 80 AK-47 rifles, mortars, mines and grenades. |
| Operation Diyala Border Police Audit | 26 May 2004 | June 2004 | Muntheria | Forward Presence: To verify the accuracy and legitimacy of the Diyala Border Polices' financial and payroll records just northeast of Kanaqan |
| Operation Giuliani | June 2004 | June 2004 | Mosul | Counterinsurgency: Was designed to seize weapons and munitions to prevent them from being used against coalition forces |
| Operation Slim Shady | June 2004 | June 2004 | Kirkuk | Counterinsurgency: Was designed to cripple the resources of Muqtada al-Sadr's militia. The 2nd Brigade of the 25th Infantry Division of the United States Military launched the operation, which was designed to cripple the resources of the then powerful rebel forces of Muqtada al-Sadr. The operation began in the first week of June 2004. Six individuals were captured, five of which were cell leaders in the Mahdi army. One of the insurgents captured was As'ad Abu Aws. As'ad Abu Aws was the second in command of the militia's Kirkuck operations. The name of the operation was taken from popular rapper Eminem's (real name Marshall Mathers) fictional alter-ego Slim Shady. Press Release |
| Operation Striker Tornado | June 2004 | June 2004 | Baghdad | Counterinsurgency: Was designed to allow the 1st Armored Division to execute near-simultaneous raids on specified targets wanted for anti-coalition activities |
| Operation Rocketman III | 8 June 2004 | 8 June 2004 | | Counterinsurgency: Designed to search and secure enemy personnel as well as those suspected of harboring insurgents and weapons. |
| Operation Dragon Victory | 19 June 2004 | 19 June 2004 | Najaf | Support and counterinsurgency: Was designed to provide relief in place of the 2nd Armored Cavalry and to provide logistical support for Task Force Danger and continue to sustain combat operations. |
| Operation Gimlet Crusader | 24 June 2004 | 24 June 2004 | Kirkuk | Counterinsurgency: Was aimed at disrupting insurgents and their attacks on multinational forces |
| Operation Gimlet Silent Sniper | July 2004 | July 2004 | Kirkuk | Counterinsurgency: Engaged in multiple searches and raids looking to capture or kill cell leaders |
| Operation Haifa Street | July 2004 | July 2004 | Baghdad | Law Enforcement: Was specifically designed as a large raid focused on criminals and criminal activity in Baghdad |
| Operation Oasis | July 2004 | July 2004 | Baghdad | Humanitarian: The overall project to improve electricity, sewers, water and other essential services around the city. |
| Operation Outlaw Destroyer | July 2004 | July 2004 | Tikrit | Counterinsurgency: Was designed to prevent insurgents from gaining weapons and munitions from known ammunition storage points |
| Operation Mutual Security | 2 July 2004 | 2 July 2004 | Mosul | Counterinsurgency: Was designed as a sweeping house-to-house search for weapons and terrorists to be conducted by only Iraqi forces |
| Operation Tombstone Piledriver | 15 July 2004 | 15 July 2004 | Baghdad | Counterinsurgency: The operation netted six individuals who were detained for questioning. |
| Operation Mayfield III | 19 July 2004 | 19 July 2004 | | |
| Operation Cobra Sweep | 28 July 2004 | 28 July 2004 | Baghdad, in the Hay Muthana district | Security and Counterinsurgency: Was designed to cordon, search, and seize bomb makers, materials and potential storage places |
| Operation Quarterhorse Rides | August 2004 | August 2004 | Ad Duluiyah | Counterinsurgency: To increase security and deter enemy attacks |
| Operation Warrior Resolve | August 2004 | August 2004 | the At Tamin and As Sulaymaniyah provinces | Counterinsurgency: Was a massive synchronized effort which attempted to deter insurgent forces |
| Operation Tiger Care | 3 August 2004 | 3 August 2004 | Balad General Hospital | Humanitarian: To assist the local hospital by procuring and delivering much needed medical supplies |
| Operation Phantom Linebacker | 4 July 2004 | 4 July 2004 | along the Syrian border | Security: Security Operations along the Syrian border. |
| Battle of Najaf | 5 August 2004 | 27 August 2004 | Najaf | Battle: Was a battle that was fought between U.S. and Iraqi forces, and the Islamist Mahdi Army of Muqtada al-Sadr |
| Battle of the CIMIC House | 5 August 2004 | 28 August 2004 | Al Amarah | Battle: Was a siege fought between UK forces, and the Islamist Mahdi Army of Muqtada al-Sadr. An estimated 200+ insurgents were killed. |
| Operation Cajun Mousetrap II | 5 August 2004 | August 2004 | Samarra | Counterinsurgency: Some small arms were found and at least three rebels were killed while nine people were detained and transferred for further questioning. |
| Operation Cajun Mousetrap III | 13 August 2004 | 15 August 2004 | Samarra | Counterinsurgency: Troops utilized targeted raids against enemy personnel who were destabilizing the city and an estimated 45 insurgents were killed. |
| Operation Iron Fury | 17 August 2004 | 2004 | Baghdad | Counterinsurgency: An "all-out effort" to stop violence in the Baghdad area by militia headed up by Shiite cleric Moqtada al-Sadr |
| Operation Showdown | 18 August 2004 | 18 August 2004 | Ar Ramadi | Counterinsurgency: To search for weapons caches and terrorists |
| Operation Wolverine | 19 August 2004 | 19 August 2004 | Ad Duluiyah | Counterinsurgency: Was designed to prevent organized insurgent force activities as well as deny AIF sanctuary |
| Operation Grizzly Forced Entry | 21 August 2004 | 21 August 2004 | Najaf | Counterinsurgency: Was designed as a search and seizure operation of high-value targets suspected of attacking coalition forces |
| Operation Clean Sweep | 23 August 2004 | 24 August 2004 | Baghdad, southern portion | Counterinsurgency: Raided 350 houses and detained 49 suspects |
| Operation True Grit | 23 August 2004 | 24 August 2004 | Ramadi | Counterinsurgency: During the operation, Multi-National Forces and SSF searched several houses and 17 insurgents were detained, four of which were found setting up an ambush on top of one of the houses |
| Operation Hurricane | September 2004 | September 2004 | Ramadi | Counterinsurgency: Resulted in the detention of four suspected insurgents, the removal of 6 bombs and the confiscation of bomb making materials, including cell phone parts |
| Operation Black Typhoon | 9 September 2004 | 14 September 2004 | Tal Afar | Counterinsurgency: All the enemy insurgents had either been killed or fled the city |
| Operation Hurricane II | 18 September 2004 | 18 September 2004 | Ramadi | Counterinsurgency: To disrupt the Daham terrorist network and to discover and remove illegal weapons and ammunition caches in the city. |
| Operation Iron Fist II | 23 September 2004 | 2004 | Ramadi | Counterinsurgency: A top priority in the operation was to detain or eliminate Moktada al-Sadr's lieutenants |
| Operation Longhorn | 24 September 2004 | 24 September 2004 | Ramadi | Counterinsurgency: A coordinated effort to detain insurgent Forces and remove illegal weapons and ammunition caches |
| Operation Marne | 24 September 2004 | 24 September 2004 | Ramadi | Counterinsurgency: A coordinated effort to detain insurgent Forces and remove illegal weapons and ammunition caches |
| Operation Predator | 24 September 2004 | 24 September 2004 | Ramadi | Counterinsurgency: A coordinated effort to detain Anti-Iraqi Forces and remove illegal weapons and ammunition caches |
| Operation Backpack | October 2004 | October 2004 | Baqubah | Humanitarian: Taking 200 backpacks filled with school supplies to school children |
| Operation Mustang Flex | October 2004 | October 2004 | Tikrit | Counterinsurgency and humanitarian: Deny insurgents sanctuary, promote the Tikrit Job Corps program, and assess essential services. |
| Operation Ramadan Roundup | October 2004 | October 2004 | Tikrit | Counterinsurgency: Resulted in the capture of 30 insurgents, more than 60 weapons, and Improvised Explosive Device making materials. |
| Operation Tangerine Pinch | October 2004 | October 2004 | Tikrit | Counterinsurgency: Deny insurgents sanctuary, promote the Tikrit Job Corps program, and assess essential services. |
| Operation Wolfhound Fury | 5 October 2004 | October 2004 | Hegneh | Counterinsurgency: A Task Force 1–27 air assault mission |
| Operation Bulldog | 6 October 2004 | 2004 | Ar-Ramadi | Counterinsurgency: Was designed to re-establish peace and stability by denying sanctuary to insurgents, capturing enemy personnel, and seize any weapons caches |
| Operation Centaur Strike II | 11 October 2004 | 11 October 2004 | Baqubah | Counterinsurgency: Was designed to seize insurgent equipment caches in hopes of disrupting terrorist activity before the Ramadan. |
| Operation Centaur Strike III | 13 October 2004 | 13 October 2004 | Baqubah | Counterinsurgency: Was designed to seize insurgent equipment caches in hopes of disrupting terrorist activity before the Ramadan. |
| Operation Mandarin Squeeze | 14 October 2004 | 14 October 2004 | Tikrit | Counterinsurgency: Its purpose was threefold; deny insurgents sanctuary, promote the Tikrit job corps program, and assess essential services. |
| Operation Mustang Socko | 14 October 2004 | 14 October 2004 | along the Tigris River | Counterinsurgency: Detained several suspects and found several weapons caches |
| Operation Tiger Cub | 14 October 2004 | 14 October 2004 | Baghdad | Humanitarian: To improve the school supply and education system throughout the greater Balad area |
| Operation Tangerine Squeeze | 15 October 2004 | 15 October 2004 | Tikrit | Counterinsurgency: Called for a complete search of more than 300 homes |
| Operation Crayon | 21 October 2004 | 21 October 2004 | Kirkuk | Humanitarian: Was a charitable program that provided schools the pencils, crayons, papers and other materials necessary to teach children |
| Operation Duliyah Sunrise | 28 October 2004 | 28 October 2004 | Ad Duluiyah | Counterinsurgency: A raid on an upscale neighborhood to search for insurgent materials |
| Operation Dallas | 29 October 2004 | 29 October 2004 | Mosul | Security: Was designed to increase security by performing cordon and knocks throughout the community |
| Operation Tiger Fury | 30 October 2004 | 2004 | east of Balad | Counterinsurgency: Was designed to stop insurgent activities and capture individuals suspected of being insurgents |
| Operation Army Santa | November 2004 | November 2004 | | Humanitarian: |
| Operation Duke Fury | 3 November 2004 | 3 November 2004 | Fallujah | Counterinsurgency: To search for weapons caches and suspected insurgents |
| Operation New Dawn (Al Fajr) | 3 November 2004 | 3 November 2004 | Fallujah | Counterinsurgency: To search for weapons caches and suspected insurgents |
| Operation Phantom Fury | 7 November 2004 | 23 December 2004 | Fallujah | Counterinsurgency: Joint American/Iraqi assault on Fallujah. See also Operation Dawn (Al-Fajr) and 2nd Battle of Fallujah |
| Operation Dawn (Al Fajr) | 8 November 2004 | 8 November 2004 | Fallujah | Counterinsurgency: The elimination of Fallujah as a terrorist safe haven |
| Battle of Mosul | 10 November 2004 | 16 November 2004 | Mosul | Battle: Was a battle fought during the Iraq War in 2004 for the capital of the Ninawa Governorate in northern Iraq that occurred concurrently to fighting in Fallujah. |
| Operation Wolfhound Power | 11 November 2004 | 12 November 2004 | Hawja | Counterinsurgency: To root insurgents out of the city |
| Operation Wolfhound Jab | 15 November 2004 | 15 November 2004 | Tall Suseus and Rubaydhah | Counterinsurgency: No one was detained and no weapon caches were found although reports were that the area contained insurgent sanctuaries |
| Operation Rock Bottom | 19 November 2004 | 21 November 2004 | | Counterinsurgency: The searches netted numerous small arms, 10 detainees and three rockets |
| Operation Plymouth Rock | 23 November 2004 | 23 November 2004 | Baghdad, South of | Counterinsurgency: Sweep south of Baghdad. |
| Operation Tobruk | 28 November 2004 | 28 November 2004 | a village along the Euphrates river 8 km Northeast of Camp Dogwood | Counterinsurgency: A search of the village for insurgents and Saddam loyalists |
| Operation Wonderland | December 2004 | 24 December 2004 | Ramadi | Counterinsurgency: Netted 29 detainees and multiple weapons caches |
| Operation Baton Rouge | 1 October 2004 | 4 October 2004 | Samarra | Counterinsurgency: The operation resulted in about 125 rebels killed and 88 were being detained |
| Operation Falcon Freedom | 5 December 2004 | 5 December 2004 | Al Rashid District | Counterinsurgency: A joint U.S.-Iraqi cordon-and-search operation were several weapons caches were discovered |
| Operation Soprano Sunset | 6 December 2004 | 6 December 2004 | Baghdad, eastern portion | Counterinsurgency: Captured several suspected senior level transnational terrorists, including key leaders, operatives, and financiers |
| Operation Iraqi Children | 8 December 2004 | 8 December 2004 | Baqubah | Humanitarian: Soldiers delivered school supplies |
| Operation Backbreaker | 21 December 2004 | 22 December 2004 | Buhriz | Security: A project to fortify a new police station as well as the Governor's mansion just down the road |
| Operation Lion Cub | 21 December 2004 | 21 December 2004 | Tikrit | Humanitarian: To deliver a load of toys to the children of the villages of Al Alam, Al Owja and Wynott |
| Operation Powder River | 31 December 2004 | 2 January 2005 | Ad Duluiyah | Counterinsurgency: Detained 49 individuals, discovered several weapons caches and searched 13 homes and the surrounding areas in a series of raids |
| Operation Triple Play | 31 December 2004 | 2 January 2005 | Salman Pak | Security: To improve security for the upcoming elections in Iraq |

== 2005 ==
Coalition and Iraqi government forces continue to battle Iraqi militants and other fighters. During early and mid-May 2005, the U.S. also launched Operation Matador, an assault by around 1,000 Marines in the ungoverned region of western Iraq. Coalition and Iraqi soldiers, Iraqi fighters and civilians have been killed in these conflicts. As of late July 2007, nearly 3,700 U.S. soldiers have been killed, and around ten times this many have been wounded. The number of Iraqi citizens who have fallen victim to the fighting has risen. The Iraqi government, with some holdovers from the CPA, engaged in securing control of the oil infrastructure (a source of Iraq's foreign currency) and control of the major cities of Iraq. The insurgency, the developing the New Iraqi Army, disorganized police and security forces, as well as a lack of revenue have hampered efforts to assert control. In addition, former Baathist elements and militant Shia groups have engaged in sabotage, terrorism, open rebellion, and establishing their own security zones in all or part of a dozen cities. The Allawi government vowed to crush the insurgency.

An election for a government to draft a permanent constitution took place during this time (ed. see Politics of Iraq for more information on the political state of Iraq). Although some violence and lack of widespread Sunni participation marred the event, much of the eligible Kurd and Shia populace participated. Sectarian violence has also been prominent part of the militant and guerrilla activity. Targets here where often Shia gatherings or civilian concentrations mainly of Shias. As a result, over 700 Iraqi civilians died in the month.

| Battle/operation name | From date | To date | Location | Purpose/result |
|---|---|---|---|---|
| Operation Attleboro(Iraq) | 2005 | 2005 | | Humanitarian: Delivered a variety of much-needed supplies and equipment to the Iraqi Police of Ash Sharqat |
| Operation Avarice | 2005 | 2006 | | Military intelligence acquired over 400 Iraqi rockets and warheads containing chemical agents in secret to keep them from falling into the hands of enemy combatants |
| Operation Dunlap | 2005 | 2005 | | |
| Operation East Lansing | 2005 | 2005 | | |
| Operation Hudson | 2005 | ???????? | | |
| Operation Moon | 2005 | 2005 | | |
| Operation Moving Forward | 2005 | 2005 | | |
| Operation Neighborhood Watch | 2005 | 2005 | | |
| Operation Spider Web | 2005 | 2005 | | |
| Operation Vacant City | 2005 | 2005 | | |
| Operation River Walk | 2 January 2005 | 3 January 2005 | Latifiyah | Counterinsurgency: Found over 9 significant weapons caches, detained 43 suspected insurgents and discovered and destroyed several bombs |
| Operation Lanthonid | 9 January 2005 | January 2005 | Baqubah, near | Counterinsurgency: Nine targeted AIF members were detained along with two other suspected AIF members and numerous weapons |
| Operation Therapist | 9 January 2005 | 9 January 2005 | near Tikrit | Counterinsurgency: During the series of raids, 11 were detained. Three of the detainees were on the target list. Also confiscated were 120 mm mortars and assorted ammunition |
| Operation Hedgehog | 10 January 2005 | 14 January 2005 | Hīt | Counterinsurgency: Discovered numerous caches of insurgent ordnance and weaponry |
| Operation Copperas Cove | 12 January 2005 | 12 January 2005 | Al-Karkh, the neighborhoods of Karkh and Sheik Marruf | Counterinsurgency: Raided a mechanic's shop suspected of being used by insurgents and found 35 mortars which had to be removed by hand |
| Operation Keystone Sweep | 14 January 2005 | 14 January 2005 | As Siniyah | Counterinsurgency: To conduct raids, capture or kill insurgents and eliminate bombs and other illegal weapons |
| Operation Clean Sweep | 18 November 2005 | 18 November 2005 | Al Buetha, 15 km South of Baghdad along the Tigris River | Counterinsurgency: "Clean out an area that was known to be used as a way for insurgents to come towards Baghdad from the south as well as an area that a lot of VBIEDs and IEDs were coming from," said U.S. Army Lt. Col. Everett Knapp, commander of the 1st Battalion, 184th Infantry Regiment. In anticipation of the, 15 December nationwide elections, U.S. soldiers assigned to 1st Battalion, 184th Infantry Regiment, as well as Iraqi forces from the 4th Public Order Brigade and 1st Commando Brigade, raided about 350 homes and detained 49 suspected terrorists. Military officials said ten of the suspects were forwarded to detention facilities. |
| Operation Checkmate | 18 January 2005 | 2005 | Jabella, 50 mi (80 km) south of Baghdad | Counterinsurgency: Successfully detained 15 insurgents including a suspected former intelligence officer in Saddam Hussein's regime |
| Operation Big Dig | 23 January 2005 | 2005 | Latifiyah | Counterinsurgency: Collected and destroyed weapons caches |
| Operation Centaur Showdown | 8 February 2005 | 8 February 2005 | Mufrek | Counterinsurgency: Searched for unregistered weapons and illegal bomb-making materials |
| Operation River Blitz | 20 February 2005 | 20 February 2005 | Al Anbar Governorate | Counterinsurgency: Targeted insurgents in cities along the Euphrates River including Hit, Ramadi, and Baghdad |
| Operation River Bridge | 12 March 2005 | 25 March 2005 | Hit–Haditha Corridor | Counterinsurgency, follow on to Operation River Blitz |
| Operation Lightning (Al Barkh) | 26 February 2005 | 25 June 2005 | Baghdad | Counterinsurgency: Shifting the new government from a defensive to an offensive posture in its efforts to disrupt terrorist activities in Baghdad |
| Operation Unforgiven | 22 March 2005 | 24 March 2005 | Albu Hatim | Counterinsurgency: The operation uncovered five weapons caches including more than 7,000 rounds of ammunition, an improvised explosive device factory and 39 members of anti-Iraqi forces |
| Operation Swashbuckle | 26 March 2005 | 26 March 2005 | Ar Ramadi | Humanitarian: The four-man comedy show, presented by Hack and Slash, provided an explosive round of entertainment for more than 100 marines |
| Operation Fontana | 2 April 2005 | 6 April 2005 | Babil and Wasit Governorates | Counterinsurgency: Was to eliminate places where terrorists trained to carry out their activities |
| Operation Block Party | 7 April 2005 | 7 April 2005 | Fallujah | Counterinsurgency: More than 100 Marines, side by side with three companies of Iraqi soldiers, cordoned and searched a targeted area of the city. |
| Operation Grey Wolf II | 10 April 2005 | 10 April 2005 | Shakarta | Counterinsurgency: A surprise operation to catch suspected terrorists and criminals |
| Operation Badlands | 12 April 2005 | 12 April 2005 | Saqlawiyah | Security and Counterinsurgency: ISF and United States Marines with 1st Battalion, 6th Marine Regiment, together with supporting mechanized elements from Regimental Combat Team-8, moved to secure Saqlawiyah and establish a base of operations there. ISF personnel and Marines from Company A, conducted security and stability operations to root out insurgent activity and illegal weapons caches. The troops also worked with civil affairs Marines to help rebuild the community, determining what facilities, such as water pumps and power stations, needed to be replaced or restored. |
| Operation Scrimmage | 14 April 2005 | 16 April 2005 | Kubaysa, Al Anbar Governorate | Unofficial name for a sub-part of operation Outerbanks |
| Operation Outer Banks | 1 April 2005 | 3 May 2005 | Hit-Haditha Corridor | Counterinsurgency |
| Operation Marlborough | May 2005 | May 2005 | Baghdad | an SBS sniper team from M squadron killed 3 insurgents. |
| Operation Quicksweep | May 2005 | May 2005 | Baghdad | Counterinsurgency: Resulted in the capture of several individuals identified as insurgents and the discovery of a weapons stash totaling 3,000 pounds of large caliber explosive munitions in a rural area northwest of Baghdad. |
| Operation Clear Decision | 3 May 2005 | 3 May 2005 | Al Karmah | Counterinsurgency: It was a success because the operation was conducted safely, insurgents were detained, and the relationship with the local populace improved |
| Operation Cobweb (MND-CS) | 6 May 2005 | 10 May 2005 | Wasit Governorate | Counterinsurgency: Twenty-nine individuals were detained while forty kinds of guns were confiscated in addition to explosive materials being found |
| Operation Matador (Battle of Al-Qa'im) | 7 May 2005 | 14 May 2005 | northwestern Al Anbar Governorate | Counterinsurgency: It was focused on eliminating insurgents and foreign fighters in a region known as a smuggling route and a sanctuary for foreign fighters |
| Battle of Al-Qa'im | 8 May 2005 | 19 May 2005 | Al Anbar Governorate | Counterinsurgency: (See Operation Matador) |
| Operation Block Party II | 9 May 2005 | 14 May 2005 | Fallujah | Counterinsurgency: Only a small amount of ordnance was found during the operation, most of it pointed out by the local residents |
| Operation Mongoose | 13 May 2005 | 13 May 2005 | south of Diyarah | Counterinsurgency: To capture individuals responsible for recent attacks against Coalition forces and local residents |
| Operation Dragons Breath | 15 May 2005 | 15 May 2005 | Ramadi | Counterinsurgency: Was designed to target insurgents in Ramadi neighborhoods |
| Operation Peninsula (MND-CS) | 19 May 2005 | 19 May 2005 | As Suwaryah | Counterinsurgency: To round up terrorists and eliminate their base of operations |
| Operation Squeeze Play | 22 May 2005 | 23 May 2005 | Baghdad, the western suburbs | Counterinsurgency: Almost 300 suspects were detained in the first day of the operation |
| Operation Chepultepec | 24 May 2005 | 24 May 2005 | Lutafiyah, the southern Ubaydah region | Counterinsurgency: The Iraqi Army detained 12 suspects and captured several weapons |
| Operation New Market(Souk Jadeed) | 25 May 2005 | 29 May 2005 | The city of Haditha | Counterinsurgency: A raid on the city of Haditha to disrupt insurgents. |
| Operation Moon River Dragon | 29 May 2005 | 29 May 2005 | the village of Al Julaam | Counterinsurgency: More than 40 individual males were interrogated about insurgent activities |
| Operation San Juan | 31 May 2005 | 4 June 2005 | | Security and Humanitarian: A five-day operation repairing Alternate Supply Route San Juan, making it safer for convoys and local civilians traveling the road on a daily basis |
| Operation Pitchfork | June 2005 | June 2005 | The area east of the Lake Tharthar region | Counterinsurgency: Marines located over 50 hidden weapons caches and an underground bunker in the vicinity of a rock quarry. |
| Operation Uhaser | June 2005 | 6 June 2005 | throughout Northern Babil Governorate, south of Baghdad | Security and Counterinsurgency: They conducted continuous patrols, vehicle checkpoints, raids, and searches |
| Operation Woodstock | June 2005 | 6 June 2005 | throughout Northern Babil Governorate, south of Baghdad | Security and Counterinsurgency: They conducted continuous patrols, vehicle checkpoints, raids, and searches |
| Operation Spear (Romhe) | 11 June 2005 | 22 June 2005 | Karabilah | Counterinsurgency: Aimed at rooting out terrorists, foreign fighters and disrupting terrorist support systems in and around Karabilah |
| Operation White Shield | 13 June 2005 | 14 June 2005 | northern Babil Governorate | Counterinsurgency: Discovered a weapons cache and detained seven terror suspects |
| Operation Dagger(Khanjar) | 18 June 2005 | 18 June 2005 | Al Anbar Governorate | Counterinsurgency: The mission, which was to locate hidden weapons caches and enemy sanctuaries, was a failure. It was conducted by the Regimental Combat Team-8, 2nd Marine Division. |
| Operation Strategic Separation (al Azil al Sitrateegi) | 25 June 2005 | June 2005 | Babil Governorate, northern portion | Counterinsurgency: Two hundred and nineteen suspected insurgents were detained |
| Operation Sword (Saif) | 27 June 2005 | 5 July 2005 | The city of Hit | Counterinsurgency: To occupy the city of Hit and establish a permanent presence there by coalition and Iraqi forces. |
| Operation Shadyville | 29 June 2005 | 29 June 2005 | Saqlawiyah | Counterinsurgency: Searched 244 houses and netted several suspected insurgent supporters, two bombs, and 50 AK-47 assault rifles |
| Operation Hunter (Sayaid) | July 2005 | July 2005 | along the Euphrates River Valley and the broder of Syria | Counterinsurgency: Aimed at denying Al Qaeda in Iraq the ability to operate in the Euphrates River Valley and at preventing the terrorists from continuing their campaign of murder and intimidation against the local population |
| Operation Seahorse | July 2005 | August 2005 | | Counterinsurgency: British-led Multi-National Division Southeast with a mission to detect and deter illicit activity along the Iraqi border |
| Operation Sergeant Thea'a | July 2005 | July 2005 | Baqubah | Counterinsurgency: Was to capture, or kill, terrorists in the city |
| Operation Thunder | July 2005 | July 2005 | Baghdad | Counterinsurgency: Found at least 1 weapons cache and detained several suspects |
| Operation Demon Digger | 1 July 2005 | 1 July 2005 | Al Rashid district, near | Counterinsurgency: seized three weapons caches |
| Operation Muthana Strike | 4 July 2005 | 4 July 2005 | Baghdad International Airport, neighborhoods next to | Counterinsurgency: Over 100 individuals were detained as a result of the operation, including reportedly foreign fighters from Egypt |
| Operation Bow Country | 5 July 2005 | 5 July 2005 | Baghdad, areas in the far-east portion | Counterinsurgency and reconnaissance: To find weapons and ammunition caches, and to develop intelligence on insurgent activity. |
| Operation Scimitar | 7 July 2005 | July 2005 | Zaidan, approximately 20 mi (30 km) southeast of Fallujah | Counterinsurgency: At least 22 suspected insurgents were detained |
| Operation Warrior's Rage | 15 July 2005 | 15 July 2005 | Baghdad, the Ameriyah district | Counterinsurgency: The search found 10 to 12 122/130-millimeter rounds enhanced with propane to make a larger fireball in the explosion |
| Battle of Haditha | 1 August 2005 | 3 August 2005 | Haditha | Battle: Was a battle fought over two days that were under insurgent control in the Euphrates River valley during 2005 |
| Operation Quickstrike | 3 August 2005 | 10 August 2005 | Haditha, Haqliniyah, and Barwanah | Counterinsurgency: An offensive operation aimed at disrupting insurgent activities and recovering a missing Marine sniper. |
| Operation Able Warrior | 4 August 2005 | 4 August 2005 | Baghdad, west of the Baghdad International Airport | Counterinsurgency: Was conducted in order to disrupt car bombing cells and roadside bomb emplacers, and prevent them from planning, preparing and carrying out terrorist attacks in the area. |
| Operation Vanguard Thunder | 5 August 2005 | 5 August 2005 | Baghdad | Counterinsurgency: Targeted 150–200 terrorist suspects. No injuries or damages were reported |
| Operation Restoring Rights | 26 August 2005 | 2005 | the northern city of Tal Afar, located 30 mi (50 km) west of Mosul, Iraq | Counterinsurgency: Was a massive military push to engage and destroy the heavy insurgent contingent located there. |
| Battle of Tal Afar | 1 September 2005 | 18 September 2005 | Tal Afar | Security and Counterinsurgency: The city was temporarily cleared for elections in 2005, but was not secured in a long-term view. |
| Operation Cyclone(Zoba) | 11 September 2005 | 11 September 2005 | Rutbah | Counterinsurgency: Against Al-Qaeda in Iraq fighters |
| Operation Flea Flicker | 14 September 2005 | 14 September 2005 | Zafaraniya | Counterinsurgency: Was designed to disrupt insurgent activity in the area in preparation for the 15 October constitutional referendum |
| Operation National Unity | 29 September 2005 | 14 September 2005, at least until | Baghdad | Counterinsurgency: Charged with the objective of detecting and halting insurgent activity. |
| Operation Rose Bowl | 29 September 2005 | 29 September 2005 | Mohawla, Diyala | Counterinsurgency: search in Mohawla 952. |
| Operation Clydesdale | October 2005 | October 2005 | | |
| Operation Mountaineers(Hiba) | October 2005 | October 2005 | southern Ramadi | Counterinsurgency: Which consists of 400 ISF soldiers and 500 U.S. service members, is to disrupt insurgents |
| Operation Carentan | October 2005 | December 2005 | Diyala and Saladin Governorate | Counterinsurgency: Was responsible for detaining over 700 suspected insurgents and clearing 120 weapons caches |
| Operation Constitution Hammer | October 2005 | October 2005 | Fallujah | Counterinsurgency: Was conducted to disrupt insurgent activity along the main supply routes in Fallujah, find and capture weapons caches, and kill or capture insurgents |
| Operation Iron Fist (Kabda Bil Hadid) | 1 October 2005 | 6 October 2005 | Sadah approximately 12 km. from the Syrian border | Counterinsurgency: In order to root out al Qaeda in Iraq terrorists operating in the area and to disrupt terrorist support systems in and around the city |
| Operation Bowie | 2 October 2005 | 4 October 2005 | Ar Ramadi, southern portion | Counterinsurgency: While sweeping through the mostly rural area, the ISF assisted the Marines in identifying people who were not from here and helped in searching homes and buildings for weapons caches and insurgent propaganda. |
| Operation Saratoga | 2 October 2005 | October 2005 | North Central Iraq | Security: To provide a safe observance of Ramadan and security for the upcoming referendum |
| Operation River Gate (Bawwabatu Annaher) | 4 October 2005 | 5 October 2005 | Haditha, Haqlaniyah and Barwana | Counterinsurgency: The operation's goal is to deny the al Qaeda in Iraq terrorist network the ability to operate in the three Euphrates River Valley cities and to free the local citizens from the insurgents' campaign of murder and intimidation |
| Operation Fiesta Bowl | 11 October 2005 | 11 October 2005 | Mohawla | Counterinsurgency: search in Mohawla 964 |
| Operation Doctor | 25 October 2005 | 25 October 2005 | Ar Ramadi, the Women's and Children's Hospital | Humanitarian: The operation, led by 6th Civil Affairs Group, supplied the hospital and the local Ministry of Health with more than $500,000 in medical supplies and equipment that was sorely needed by the citizens of the Al Anbar provincial capital. |
| Operation Cornhusker | 1 November 2005 | 1 November 2005 | Mohawla | Counterinsurgency: cordon and search in Mohawla 953 and clearing operations in Mohawla 955 |
| Operation Open Window | November 2005 | 2005 | the south central region of Iraq | Security: To prepare the area for transfer to the responsibility of the Iraqi 8th Division. |
| Operation Tigers (Numur) | November 2005 | December 2005 | Ramadi | Counterinsurgency: Resulted in the capture of several weapons caches and several terrorist suspects |
| Operation Wolf Stalk II | November 2005 | November 2005 | Ninevah | Counterinsurgency: Soldiers were charged with disrupting insurgent activity and responding to the needs of local citizens. |
| Operation Great Lakes | November 2005 | November 2005 | | Counterinsurgency: Army National Guard, Army and USMC units from FOB Grizzly were charged with disrupting insurgent activity south of Udame. SFC Kyle B. Wehrly of the 2nd Battalion, 123rd Field Artillery was killed in the Operation. |
| Operation Shank(Harba) | 2 November 2005 | 3 December 2005 | Ramadi, central and southern portions | Counterinsurgency: Was the fifth in a series by the Iraqi army and coalition forces engaged in combined clearing operations to disrupt terrorism and set conditions for a successful, 15 December election in the provincial capital of Anbar |
| Operation Syrian Round-up | 5 November 2005 | 5 November 2005 | Zafaraniya | Counterinsurgency: clear Mohawla 965. A car was confiscated. |
| Operation Steel Curtain(Al Hajip Elfulathi) | 5 November 2005 | 22 November 2005 | Karabilah | Counterinsurgency: A Continued effort to clear the town of insurgent activity and weapons |
| Operation Slapshot | 6 November 2005 | 6 November 2005 | near Sindabad | Counterinsurgency: targets in M979 and clear Bania Farm. |
| Operation Fiesta Bowl II | 9 November 2005 | 9 November 2005 | Diyala | Counterinsurgency: clear M964. |
| Operation Knockout | 12 November 2005 | 12 November 2005 | Ba'qubah | Counterinsurgency: A division-size raid designed to destroy or disrupt all of their cells in a large locality in a single night |
| Operation Paradise City II | 12 November 2005 | 12 November 2005 | Around Rasheed Airfield | Clearing operation in Zone 11W |
| Operation Kennesaw Dragon | 14 November 2005 | 15 November 2005 | Dawr | Counterinsurgency: Conducted an air assault into landing zones outside the town and moved in to search for insurgents, insurgent activity and weapons caches. |
| Operation Panthers (Numur) | 16 November 2005 | 18 November 2005 | Ramadi, the Sophia district | Counterinsurgency: Discovered weapons caches and detained suspected terrorists |
| Operation Home Run | 17 November 2005 | 17 November 2005 | Zafaraniya | Counterinsurgency: clear Mohawla 959 in Zafaraniya |
| Operation Bruins(Dibbah) | 19 November 2005 | 20 November 2005 | Ramadi | Counterinsurgency and Security: Part of a series of disruption operations in Ramadi and is designed to set the conditions for successful elections in December |
| Operation Cotton Bowl | 22 November 2005 | 22 November 2005 | Zafaraniya | Counterinsurgency: clear Mohawla 961 in Zafaraniya |
| Operation Lions(Asad) | 22 November 2005 | 24 November 2005 | Ar Ramadi, the Tammim area | Counterinsurgency: This operation involved Iraqi Army and Coalition Forces clearing sections of the city to disrupt the insurgency and set conditions for successful elections on 15 December |
| Operation Tyche Round-up | 26 November 2005 | 26 November 2005 | Diyala | Counterinsurgency: capture/kill AIF targets in Mohawla 964. |
| Operation Turkey Bowl | 28 November 2005 | 28 November 2005 | Zafaraniya | Counterinsurgency: clear Mohawla 951. |
| Operation Iron Hammer (Matraqa Hadidia) | 30 November 2005 | 3 December 2005 | Hai al Becker region | Security: The completion of construction of a long-term base on the eastern side of the Euphrates River across from Hīt and about 170 kilometers west of Baghdad |
| Operation Green Trident | December 2005 | December 2005 | Fallujah, south of | Counterinsurgency: U.S. Marines discovered more than ten metric tons of munitions hidden at 72 cache sites 39 km south of Fallujah |
| Operation Rams(Tallie) | 4 December 2005 | 4 December 2005 | Ramadi | Counterinsurgency: The forces have discovered four weapons |
| Operation Stocking Stuffer | 4 December 2005 | 4 December 2005 | Diyala | Counterinsurgency: raid on 3 Ansar-al-Sunna targets in M964 |
| Operation Skinner(Gashshaa) | 7 December 2005 | 10 December 2005 | central Ramadi | Counterinsurgency: The operation netted four weapons caches and several detainees and also two command initiated rocket systems designed to ambush passing convoys in central Ramadi. The combined forces also discovered a roadside bomb that the insurgents planned to use in the rocket attack. |
| Operation Able Rising Force | 8 December 2005 | 9 December 2005 | Khadisia | Counterinsurgency: Locate and detain suspected terrorists |
| Operation Bull Dawg Chariot | 8 December 2005 | 8 December 2005 | Baqubah, near | Counterinsurgency: The operation reportedly netted four suspected terrorists |
| Operation Liberty Express | 13 December 2005 | 15 December 2005 | Fallujah | Security: Transportation of election supplies from the printer to the camp, where Iraqi Police and members of the Independent Electoral Commission of Iraq picked up and escorted the supplies, including ballots, and dispersed them to various polling sites in the city of Fallujah |

== 2006 ==
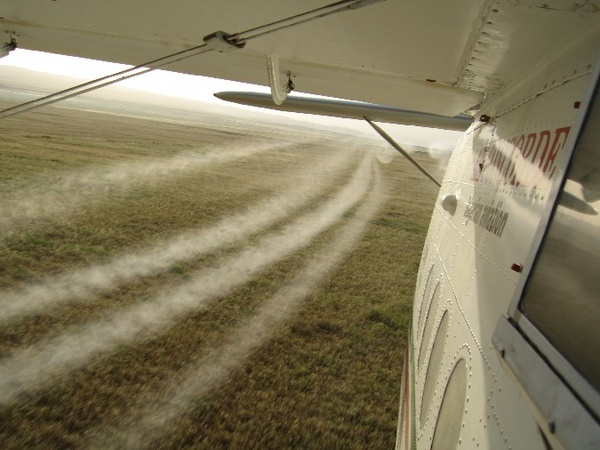
Soviet Antonov An-2 airplane sprays pesticide on wheat crops during Operation Barnstormer (May 2006).

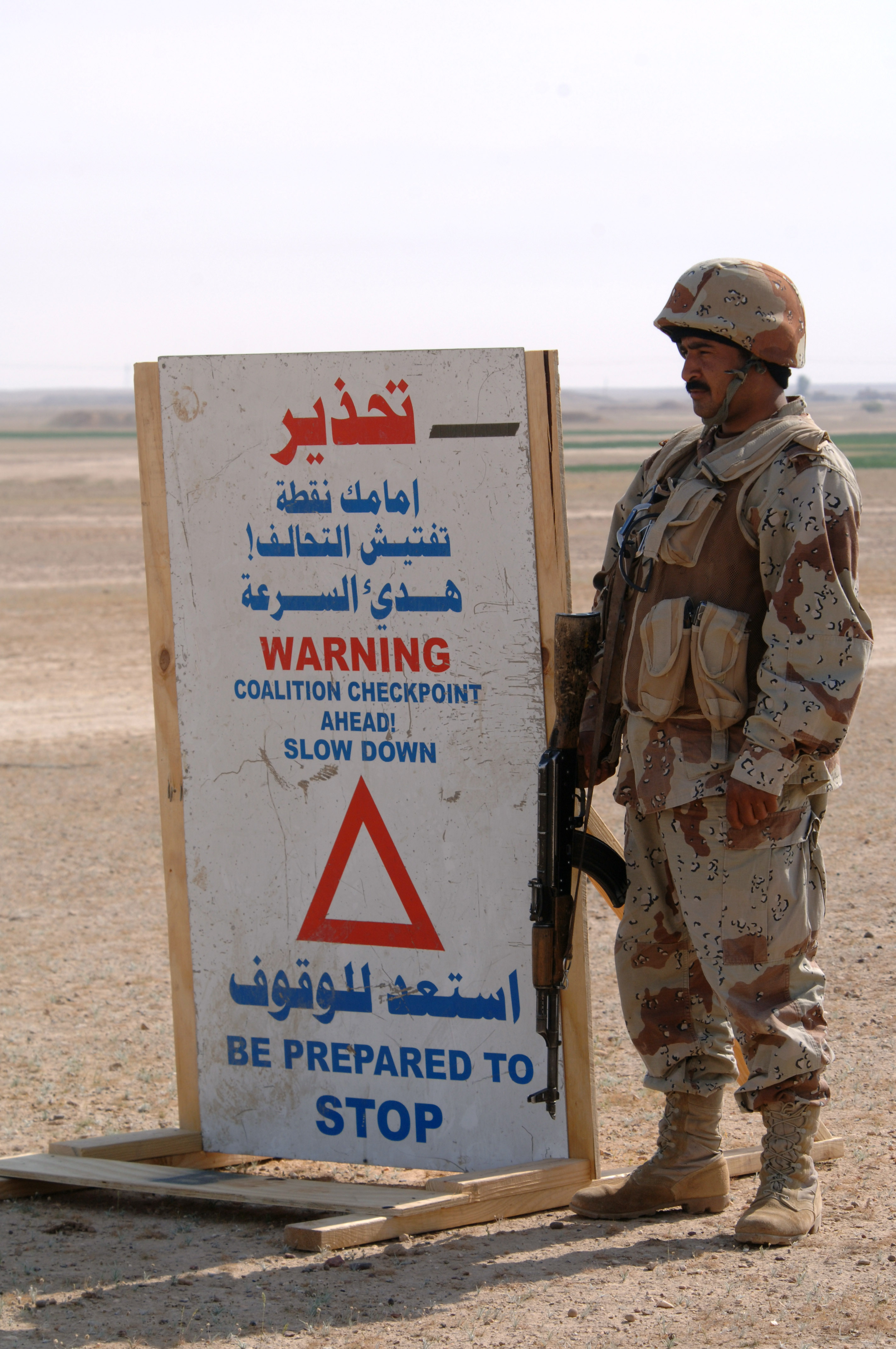
Salah Ad Din Governorate (31 March 2006) – An Iraq Army soldier assigned to the 1st Battalion, 1st Brigade, 4th Division, mans a checkpoint during Operation Red Light II, on the outskirts of Monfia village in the Western Desert

The beginning of 2006 was marked by government creation talks, growing sectarian violence, and continuous anti-coalition attacks. Sectarian violence expanded to a new level of intensity following the al-Askari Mosque bombing in the Iraqi city of Samarra, on 22 February 2006. The explosion at the mosque, one of the holiest sites in Shi'a Islam, is believed to have been caused by a bomb planted by Al-Qaeda in Iraq. Although no injuries occurred in the blast, the mosque was severely damaged and the bombing resulted in violence over the following days.

As of 20 October the U.S. military announced that Operation Together Forward had failed to stem the tide of violence in Baghdad, and Shiite militants under al-Sadr seized several southern Iraq cities.

On 23 November, the deadliest attack since the beginning of the Iraq war occurred. Suspected Sunni-Arab militants used five suicide car bombs and two mortar rounds on the capital's Shiite Sadr City slum to kill at least 215 people and wound 257. Shiite mortar teams quickly retaliated, firing 10 shells at Sunni Islam's most important shrine in Baghdad, badly damaging the Abu Hanifa mosque and killing one person. Eight more rounds slammed down near the offices of the Association of Muslim Scholars, the top Sunni Muslim organisation in Iraq, setting nearby houses on fire. Two other mortar barrages on Sunni neighborhoods in west Baghdad killed nine and wounded 21, police said.

After capture in December 2003, Saddam Hussein was hanged on 30 December 2006, after being found guilty of crimes against humanity by an Iraqi court.

| Battle/operation name | From date | To date | Location | Purpose/result |
|---|---|---|---|---|
| Operation Industrial Revolution | 10 August 2006 | 10 August 2006 | Southeast Fallujah/Industrial Sector | Cordon and Search looking for roadside and car bomb Making Facilities |
| Operation Iron Arrow I | 2006 | 2006 | Obeidi region, northern portion | Counterinsurgency: Conducted to root out terrorists on the Sunni side of town |
| Operation Post Hawk | 2006 | 2006 | | |
| Operation Unified Fist | 2006 | 2006 | Baghdad | Counterinsurgency: |
| Operation Baghdad is Beautiful | January 2006 | January 2006 | Baghdad | Humanitarian: Cleanup up Baghdad |
| Operation King Tut | January 2006 | January 2006 | Baghdad | Security: Searched for weapons caches |
| Operation Red Bull | January 2006 | January 2006 | the "Triad" area of Haditha, Haqlaniyah and Barwana | Security: The search revealed 75 weapons caches terrorists planned to use during attacks in the region. |
| Operation Falcon Sweep | 11 January 2006, on or about | 11 January 2006, on or about | Shakaria | Counterinsurgency: One of the operation's objectives was to identify and capture terrorists in the village |
| Operation Red Bull II | 18 January 2006 | 18 January 2006 | the "Triad" area of Haditha, Haqlaniyah and Barwana | Counterinsurgency: Continue clearing all insurgent operations out of the "Triad" area. |
| Operation Final Strike (Al Dharba Al Nihaa'ya) | 29 January 2006 | 29 January 2006 | Jazerra area northwest of Habbaniyah, 75 km west of Baghdad | Counterinsurgency: Aimed at neutralizing the insurgency activity and providing a secure area for the citizens of the Jazerra. |
| Operation Smokewagon | 2 February 2006 | 5 February 2006 | Hīt, numerous villages south of | Counterinsurgency: Looking for insurgents and their weapons caches |
| Operation PitBull | 10 February 2006 | 17 February 2006 | east of the Euphrates River | Counterinsurgency: Designed to squash insurgent operations |
| Operation God help us (Ala Allah) | 12 February 2006 | 13 February 2006 | Subiyhat | Counterinsurgency: To clear the area of insurgents and interact with the populace |
| Operation Dirty Harry | 20 February 2006 | 20 February 2006 | Muqdadiyah, a neighborhood and farmlands in the southern portion | Security and Counterinsurgency: To cordon and knock a local neighborhood which included searching homes and farmland for anti-coalition forces and weapon caches |
| Operation Minotaur | 26 February 2006 | 26 February 2006 | a town along the Euphrates River in Al Anbar Province, northwest of Baghdad | Counterinsurgency: Was aimed at clearing more than nine kilometers of riverbank and several small villages south of Haqlaniyah |
| Operation Swamp Fox | March 2006 | March 2006 | Muqdadiyah | Counterinsurgency: Coalition and Iraqi forces detained 104 suspected insurgents and confiscated a cache of weapons |
| Operation Raging Bull | March 2006 | March 2006 | the "Triad" region of Haditha, Haqliniyah, and Barwanah off the Euphrates River in western Al Anbar Province | Counterinsurgency: The first, fully independent Iraqi Army-led mission in the "Triad" region |
| Operation Raging Bull II | March 2006 | March 2006 | | |
| Operation Jaws V | March 2006 | 4 March 2006 | Fallujah | Counterinsurgency: Disrupting insurgents' efforts to launch mortar and improvised explosive device attacks against Coalition Forces |
| Operation El Toro Loco | 1 March 2006 | 1 March 2006 | Baghdadi | Counterinsurgency: |
| Operation Glory Light | 2 March 2006 | 9 March 2006 | Sadr to Yusufiyah area | Counterinsurgency: Was designed to deny insurgents sanctuary and preempt enemy attacks in the Baghdad area |
| Operation Lion | 2 March 2006 | 2 March 2006 | Baghdad | Counterinsurgency: Discovered more than 62 tons of munitions and weapons were discovered in over 80 weapons caches as well as the capture of 65 suspected insurgents |
| Operation Mr. Rogers' Neighborhood. | 10 March 2006 | 10 March 2006 | Fallujah | Humanitarian: Handed out toys and pamphlets to Iraqi Children |
| Operation Focus | 12 March 2006 | 12 March 2006 | Diwaniyah | Counterinsurgency: Found a weapons cache |
| Operation Scales of Justice | 12 March 2006 | March 2006 | Baghdad | Counterinsurgency: Approximately 800 suspected insurgents had been detained and 140 weapons caches discovered and cleared as part of the operation |
| Operation Swarmer | 16 March 2006 | 22 March 2006 | a 10-by-10-mile square area northeast of Samarra | Counterinsurgency: The operation resulted in 104 suspected insurgents currently being detained and questioned, and 24 caches discovered. |
| Operation Cowpens | 19 March 2006 | 14 April 2006 | Jabouri Peninsula | Counterinsurgency: Discovering caches and hampering insurgent efforts |
| Operation Northern Lights | 21 March 2006 | 2006 | Abu Ghraib | Counterinsurgency: To disrupt anti-Iraqi forces and to find and destroy terrorist caches in Abu Ghraib. Operation Northern Lights was a joint US–Iraqi operation which consisted of approximately 1,400 personnel. Most of the information is confidential and not public. |
| Operation Scorpion | 24 March 2006 | 25 March 2006 | Hawija | Counterinsurgency: A sequential cordon and search of eight villages in and around Hawija. By the end of the operation, around 52 suspected insurgents were detained. |
| Operation Red Light II | 31 March 2006 | 31 March 2006 | Saladin Governorate | Counterinsurgency: Detained 17 anti-Iraqi forces personnel and discovered four weapons caches |
| Operation Cobra Strike (2006) | April 2006 | April 2006 | Haswah and Iskandariyah | Counterinsurgency: Was a mission intended to locate the suspected leader and financier of a terrorist cell working in the area. The suspected terrorists were implicated in murders, kidnappings and the emplacement of roadside bombs |
| Operation Harvest Lights | April 2006 | May 2006 | Najaf, Karbala and Babil Provinces | Humanitarian: To control the progressive loss of the date palm crop and regenerate the industry |
| Operation Money Worth | April 2006 | April 2006 | Baghdad | Security: Placed more than 500 concrete barriers at points throughout Baghdad |
| Operation Sterling | April 2006 | 2006 | Basra | Counterinsurgency: Detained 14 individuals and recovered a significant weapons cache |
| Operation Hastings | 4 April 2006 | 7 April 2006 | Fallujah, northeast of | Counterinsurgency: To take weapons out of the hands of insurgents |
| Operation Bastogne | 6 April 2006 | 6 April 2006 | Baghdad | Security: Blocking off escape routes frequented by insurgents |
| Operation Bold Action | 10 April 2006 | 10 April 2006 | Tarmiya, near | Security: To provide more security near Tarmiya by chasing the terrorists |
| Operation Larchwood 4 | 16 April 2006 | 16 April 2006 | Yusufiyah | Members of B squadron 22 SAS and a platoon of British paratroopers supported by US aircraft launched the operation that was aimed at mid-level Al-Qaeda leadership, the operation was a success and an intelligence coup that led the finding and killing of Abu Musab al-Zarqawi. |
| Operation Swift Sword | 26 April 2006 | 29 April 2006 | the villages and farms west of Bayji | Counterinsurgency: The operation resulted in the capture of 17 suspected insurgents and the confiscation of a cache of weapons. The cache included more than 100 artillery rounds, mortar rounds, mines, rocket-propelled grenades, sniper rifles, and 4,500 rounds of ammunition |
| Operation Babil Perimeter | 28 April 2006 | May 2006 | Al Hayy | Counterinsurgency: Detained five known insurgents and found some weapons caches |
| Operation Lion Hunt | 29 April 2006 | May 2006 | Mosul | Counterinsurgency: Designed to remove the insurgents from the region making the area safer and to train the Iraqi police |
| Operation Dragons Breath | May 2006 | May 2006 | Ramadi | Counterinsurgency: Search for weapons caches and insurgents |
| Operation Lion Hunt II | May 2006 | June 2006 | Nineveh Governorate | Counterinsurgency: To further develop the Iraq police in cordons and searches while reducing the insurgency in the Ninewah province |
| Operation Stallion Run | May 2006 | May 2006 | Baghdad | Security and Counterinsurgency: The operation was focused on clearing the roads of bombs and the debris that could hide them |
| Operation Lion | 4 May 2006 | 4 May 2006 | Mosul | Counterinsurgency: A cordon and search operation |
| Operation Lightning Blitz | 5 May 2006 | 7 May 2006 | | |
| Operation Tropical Lightning | 6 May 2006 | 6 May 2006 | | Counterinsurgency: |
| Operation Unified Front | 6 May 2006 | 6 May 2006 | Ameriya | Counterinsurgency: An effort to capture anti-Iraqi forces and seize weapons caches in the neighborhood of Ameriya |
| Operation Lofty Summit | 7 May 2006 | 7 May 2006 | Mushada | Security: Coalition forces will stage out of the same patrol base as the 11th Special Infrastructure Battalion, a specialized Iraqi army unit that protects an oil pipeline running through Mushada. |
| Operation Iron Triangle | 9 May 2006 | 11 May 2006 | Tikrit | Counterinsurgency: The operation resulted in the detention of 200 suspected terrorists and the confiscation of weapons and propaganda materials at an insurgent training camp southwest of the city. |
| Operation Barnstormer | 16 May 2006 | 18 May 2006 | Karbala, Wasit, Babil, Baghdad, Diyala, Ninewa and Dohuk | Humanitarian: To protect key staple crops from insect damage in several Iraq provinces |
| Operation Chepultepec | 24 May 2006 | 24 May 2006 | the Ubaydah region of Southern Lutafiyah | Counterinsurgency: Iraqi Police and Coalition Forces provided the outer cordon around the 80 square kilometer area while the Iraqi Army advanced to their objective to drive the terrorists from the region. |
| Operation Tinto | 25 May 2006 | 25 May 2006 | Basrah | Counterinsurgency: Was a search and arrest mission |
| Operation Coolspring VIII | 2006 | 9 May 2006 | Mosul | Counterinsurgency: Three men of military age previously on the Iraqi Army's most wanted list were detained in searches of a wide area south of the city. |
| Operation Roaring Tiger | 3 June 2006 | 3 June 2006 | Baghdad, Adhamiyah district | Counterinsurgency: The operation captured 19 suspected insurgents |
| Operation Cool Carpet | 9 June 2006 | 9 June 2006 | Gharmah | Humanitarian: To deliver prayer rugs along with two new air conditioning units |
| Operation Together Forward | 14 June 2006 | 24 October 2006 | Baghdad | Security: One of the largest combined security operations in the city since the fall of Saddam Hussein in 2003 |
| Battle of Ramadi | 17 June 2006 | 15 November 2006 | Ramadi | Peacekeeping: The objective of the operation was to take full control of a city that had been out of the hands of the American military for the better part of two years. |
| Operation Sand Storm | 26 June 2006 | 26 June 2006 | Ayn Mana | Counterinsurgency: To seek out illicit weapons and insurgent forces |
| Operation Iron Gate | June 2006 | July 2006 | Hawija and Riyadh | Counterinsurgency: Observe and prevent illegal border crossing's from Iran |
| Operation Relentless Hunt | July 2006 | August 2006 | Hawija and Riyadh | |
| Operation Gaugamela | 20 July 2006 | July 2006 | Hawija and Riyadh | Counterinsurgency: A search for suspected al-Qaeda terrorists in towns just west of Kirkuk |
| Operation River Falcon | 25 July 2006 | 27 July 2006 | Sayifiyeh | Counterinsurgency: The operation was aimed at denying terrorists the use of the town as a safe haven, disrupting insurgent attacks on Coalition and Iraqi Security Forces, and on collecting and destroying insurgent munitions |
| Operation Thundercat | 26 July 2006 | 30 July 2006 | Baghdad | Counterinsurgency: To disrupt and destroy the insurgency in and around Baghdad |
| Operation Floodlight | August 2006 | 9 August 2006, on or about | Fallujah | Counterinsurgency: To locate insurgents and weapons targeting coalition and Iraqi forces south of the city |
| Operation Guardian Tiger IV | August 2006 | August 2006 | Haditha Triad region's | Counterinsurgency: Captured more than 30 suspected insurgents |
| Operation Passage | 20 August 2006 | 20 August 2006 | Al Magrab, near Mosul | Counterinsurgency: an Iraqi Army, Iraqi Police and U.S. Army joint forces mission |
| Operation Rubicon | 25 August 2006 | 25 August 2006 | Husayba | Counterinsurgency: Destroyed AQI and Sunni insurgents supply line into Ramadi, numerous insurgent casualties reported. |
| Battle of Diwaniya | 28 August 2006 | 28 August 2006 | Diwaniya | Counterinsurgency: Battle between the Mahdi Army and the Iraqi Army |
| Operation Constant Solidarity | 1 September 2006 | 1 September 2006 | Diwaniyah | Counterinsurgency: To weed out more than 2,000 terrorists in and around the city |
| Operation Yorktown | 26 September 2006 | 26 September 2006 | Al Anbar Province | Security and Law enforcement: To develop the Iraqi Security Forces, facilitate the development of official rule of law through democratic government reforms, and continue the development of a market based economy centered on Iraqi reconstruction |
| Battle of Al Rumaythah | 26 September 2006 | 26 September 2006 | Al Rumaythah | Contact between Australian forces from Overwatch Battle Group (West) and unidentified insurgents. |
| Operation Iron Arrow II | 30 September 2006 | 30 September 2006 | Obeidi region | Security: An IA-led effort aimed at establishing security in the northern portion of the region on the Shia side |
| Operation Commando Hunter | 2 October 2006 | October 2006 | Yusufiyah | Counterinsurgency: Was intended to deny terrorists sanctuary in the city 20 mi (30 km) southwest of Baghdad |
| Operation SOUK | 2 October 2006 | 2 October 2006 | Fallujah | Counterinsurgency: A cordon and search mission |
| Operation Half Nelson | 4 October 2006 | 4 October 2006 | Hurriyah | Peacekeeping and Counterinsurgency: An attempt to build trust with Iraqi civilians and eliminate terrorists |
| Operation Medusa | 4 October 2006 | 4 October 2006 | Mosul | |
| Operation Benefit Day | 11 October 2006 | 11 October 2006 | Baghdad | Humanitarian: Marines and Iraqi Security Forces passed out backpacks full of school supplies to the children |
| Operation Dealer | 12 October 2006 | 12 October 2006 | Ramadi | Security: Was undertaken to establish a combat outpost in the area. |
| Battle of Amarah | 19 October 2006 | 20 October 2006 | Amarah | Battle: Began when 800 masked members of the Mahdi army stormed three police stations in Amarah |
| Operation Helping Hand | 21 October 2006 | 21 October 2006 | Tuz | Humanitarian: Delivered basic food staples to about 300 Kurd, Turkmen and Arab families |
| Operation Trifecta | 14 November 2006 | 18 November 2006 | Zaidon | Security and Counterinsurgency: Performed house-to-house searches and widespread cache sweeps |
| Battle of Turki | 15 November 2006 | 16 November 2006 | Turki | Battle: Was fought over 40 hours between American paratroopers of the 82nd Airborne Division and well trained insurgent forces. |
| Operation Talon | 12 November 20060 | 20 November 2006 | Fallujah, north of | Humanitarian and Counterinsurgency: Rescued 2 hostages and detained 13 suspected insurgents |
| Operation Polar Black Diamond | 25 November 2006 | 25 November 2006 | al Taca | Security and Counterinsurgency: Detained 10 terrorist suspects and found a cache of improvised explosive device components |
| Operation Polar Valor | 7 December 2006 | 7 December 2006 | | |
| Operation Cougar | 10 December 2006 | 10 December 2006 | Adhamiyah | Security and counterinsurgency: A cordon and search operation |
| Operation Arctic Sunrise | 16 December 2006 | 16 December 2006 | Baghdad, South of | Counterinsurgency: Removed a sizeable cache of bomb making material, detained 11 individuals believed to be involved in insurgent activities and improved the living conditions for the Iraqi people in the area |
| Operation Eagle Watch | 15 December 2006 | 16 December 2006 | Tikrit | Counterinsurgency: Fifteen suspects were detained in several locations near the city |
| Operation Moonlight (Alkamra Almaner) | 19 December 2006 | 21 December 2006 | | Counterinsurgency: Netted a weapons cache and demonstrated the Iraqi Army soldiers' ability to gather intelligence, plan, execute and exercise command and control during a large-scale operation |
| Operation Gladiator | 23 December 2006 | 23 December 2006 | Baghdad | Counterinsurgency: To sweep the Al Doura market and clear the area so merchants can return and be safe |
| Operation Beastmaster | 29 December 2006 | 29 December 2006 | Baghdad, the western suburb of Ghazaliya | Counterinsurgency: Cleared three large neighborhoods which were the sights of much sectarian violence |

== 2007 ==
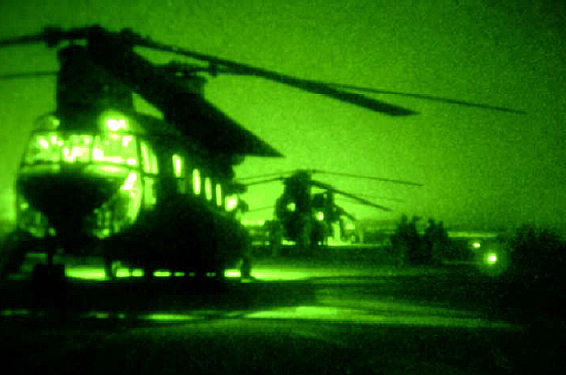
Soldiers have a short meeting at an airfield in Baqubah before an air assault into an outlying village of the city, 18 June 2007

2007 saw a rise in humanitarian and peacekeeping operations as well as a large "surge" in US forces designed to help stabilize the region.

On 10 January 2007, President Bush announced changes in the administration's political and military strategy in the Iraq War during a television speech broadcast. The speech and underlying strategy had been crafted under the working title "The New Way Forward." In the address Bush stated "America will change our strategy to help the Iraqis carry out their campaign to put down sectarian violence and bring security to the people of Baghdad. This will require increasing American force levels. So I've committed more than 20,000 additional American troops to Iraq. The vast majority of them—five brigades—will be deployed to Baghdad."

As part of this new strategy, 2007 saw several major military operations aimed at eliminating insurgent activities, increase support services such as medical facilities and utilities and the training of Iraqi citizens as police or military personnel.

The largest of these new operations were Operations Law and Order, Phantom Thunder and Phantom Strike.

| Battle/Operation name | From date | To date | Location | Purpose/Result |
|---|---|---|---|---|
| Operation Arrowhead Strike VI | 2007 | 2007 | Baghdad | Counterinsurgency: Part of the continuing security plan for Baghdad |
| Operation Green Angel | 2007 | 2007 | | |
| Operation Three Swords | 2007 | 2007 | | |
| Operation Michigan | 2007 | 2007 | | |
| Operation White Rockets | 2007 | 6 March 2007 | near Bin Muhammad south of Baghdad | Counterinsurgency: Found two ammunition caches and detaining two suspects |
| Operation Locust | January 2007 | January 2007 | | |
| Operation Three Kings | January 2007 | January 2007 | | |
| Operation Arrowhead Strike III | 3 January 2007 | ???????? | Baghdad | Counterinsurgency: Captured 13 suspected insurgents and recovered several weapons in the northwestern area of the city |
| Operation Turki Bowl | 4 January 2007 | 13 January 2007 | south of Balad Ruz in the Turki Village, Tuwilla and 30 Tamuz areas of the province | Counterinsurgency: U.S. and Iraqi forces killed 100 terrorists, detained 50, and dismantled a large terrorist group |
| Battle of Haifa Street | 6 January 2007 | 9 January 2007 | Baghdad, Haifa Street | Battle: Was a battle fought over three days for the control of Haifa Street, a two-mile (3 km)-long street in downtown Baghdad, between American and Iraqi Army forces and various insurgent forces |
| Operation Turki Bowl II | 8 January 2007 | 8 January 2007 | Balaruz | Counterinsurgency |
| Operation Machete Harvest | 10 January 2007 | 11 January 2007 | Yusufiyah | Counterinsurgency: To deny anti-Iraq forces a safe haven in the area |
| Operation Koa Canyon (Wadi Aljundi) | 19 January 2006 | 27 January 2006 | along the Euphrates River | Counterinsurgency: An effort to disrupt insurgent activity and to root out their weapons stores along the Euphrates River |
| Operation Howard | 16 January 2007 | 16 January 2007 | Risalah | Iraqi army forces elements detained 19 men during operations to capture an illegal armed group leader allegedly responsible for coordinating violent attacks against Iraqi civilians and coalition forces |
| Operation Arbead II | 18 January 2007 | 18 January 2007 | Fallujah | Counterinsurgency: To detain members of a murder and intimidation cell |
| Operation Northern Venture | 2007021 | 21 January 2007 | Al Anbar Province | Counterinsurgency: Marines from 2nd Battalion, 8th Marine Regiment, Regimental Combat Team 5, uncovered 14 large caches |
| Operation Warm-Up | 22 January 2007 | 22 January 2007 | Kawla and Darar | Humanitarian: Distributed cloths, food, first aid kits and school supplies to children in Iraq |
| Operation Black Eagle II | 23 January 2007 | 23 January 2007 | Mahmudiyah | Counterinsurgency: Soldiers detained three suspected terrorists for suspicious activity. Weapons found during the operation included two AK-47 bandoleers and two Katyusha rocket casings |
| Operation Eagle Claw XI | 23 January 2007 | 23 January 2007 | Mrbat Garhat Village near Kirkuk | Counterinsurgency: |
| Operation Tomahawk Strike 11 | 24 January 2007 | 24 January 2007 | Baghdad | Counterinsurgency: A series of targeted raids to disrupt illegal militia activity and help restore Iraqi security force control in the area |
| Battle of Najaf (2007) | 28 January 2007 | 29 January 2007 | Zarqa, Najaf Governorate | Counterinsurgency: Was a battle that was fought between U.S. and Iraqi forces, and the Islamist Mahdi Army of Muqtada al-Sadr |
| Operation New Day | 29 January 2007 | 29 January 2007 | the Al Warar District of Ar Ramadi | Counterinsurgency: The joint force searched more than 50 homes in the area while detaining two suspected insurgents. |
| Operation SINBAD | 6 February 2007 | 6 February 2007 | Hay A'Tanumah, a number of locations on the eastern bank of the Shatt Al'Arab opposite the main town of Basra | Counterinsurgency: Six people were detained during the operation and later released. A quantity of munitions were discovered and later disposed of by explosive experts |
| Law and Order(Fardh Al-Qanoon) | 14 February 2007 | 2007 | An operation to secure the population of Baghdad by targeting al Qaeda, Sunni insurgent, and Shi'a extremist elements.| | |
| Operation Wolverine Alesia | 23 February 2007 | 3 February 2007 | Yusufiyah | Counterinsurgency: Discovered a weapons cache with a total of 1,129 mortar rounds uncovered |
| Operation Brown Hawk | 25 February 2007 | 25 February 2007 | Tahrir | Counterinsurgency: To eliminate Tahrir as an operating base for improvised explosive device building cells and key leaders of the Al-Qaeda forces in Iraq. |
| Operation Saber Boss | 26 February 2007 | 26 February 2007 | Muqdadiya | Counterinsurgency: Seized four weapons caches, killed approximately 10 insurgents and detained five suspected terrorists |
| Operation Ranger Dominance | March 2007 | March 2007 | Baghdad | Counterinsurgency: The first step in their portion of the Baghdad Security Plan |
| Operation Agave L | 4 March 2007 | 4 March 2007 | | |
| Operation Tomahawk Strike 12 | 4 March 2007 | 4 March 2007 | Baghdad's Sadr City | Counterinsurgency: A combined clearance of Sadr City to set secure conditions and identify and destroy militant threats and safe houses in the area in preparation of the establishment of a District Joint Security Station. |
| Operation Phoenix | 5 March 2007 | 5 March 2007 | Basrah City | Counterinsurgency: A short-notice, reactive strike operation launched on a building west of the Al Jameat district of the city as a direct result of information gained after an attack made on a Multi National Forces base |
| Operation Dragon Surge | 17 March 2007 | 17 March 2007 | Baghdad | Forward Presence and Security: To establish a presence within the city to deter the sectarian violence against the Iraqi population from insurgents and establish a footprint of Coalition Forces |
| Operation Arrowhead Strike 9 | 20 March 2007 | April 2007 | Baghdad, west-central Mansour security district | Counterinsurgency: Succeeded in preventing 3,200 roadside bombs, jailing 42 terrorists, and seizing enough weapons and explosives to outfit an enemy infantry battalion |
| Operation Enduring Education | 25 March 2007 | 1 April 2007 | throughout Iraq | Humanitarian: To fill the shelves of schools with necessary tools to build the foundation of a solid education |
| Operation Regular Justice | 5 April 2007 | 5 April 2007 | Diyala Province | |
| Operation Valiant Guardian (Harris Ba'sil) | 5 April 2007 | 20 May 2007 | outside of the major cities of the Euphrates River valley in western al Anbar province | Counterinsurgency: Eight weeks of interdicting and disrupting enemy routes and safe havens |
| Operation Black Eagle | 6 April 2007 | 6 April 2007 | Diwaniya | Counterinsurgency: U.S. troops battled gunmen loyal to anti-American cleric Muqtada al-Sadr in the town of Diwaniya for control of the city |
| Operation Black Eagle City | 11 April 2007 | April 2007 | Diwaniya | Humanitarian: Was a follow-on operation to Operation Black Eagle designed to rebuild the city and provide humanitarian aid to the people most affected by the recent militia violence |
| Operation Dixon | 12 April 2007 | 12 April 2007 | Baghdad, eastern portion | Security and counterinsurgency: Was aimed at disrupting car bomb networks operating in the area and gaining additional information and intelligence on those networks. |
| Operation Yukon River | 12 April 2007 | 12 April 2007 | Adwaniyah | Security: A joint effort that established security in the southeastern portion of Baghdad |
| Operation Eagle Lightning | 16 April 2007 | 16 April 2007 | Baghdad, just south in the Shaka area | Counterinsurgency: Detained 33 suspected terrorists, discovered 6 weapons caches and 5 bombs |
| Operation School Supplies | 18 April 2007 | 18 April 2007 | throughout Iraq | Humanitarian: Is a program where school supplies are donated to local Iraqi students who wouldn't otherwise have what's needed for a good education |
| Operation Commando Dive | 21 April 2007 | 21 April 2007 | Baghdad, just south of, in the Shubayshen area | Counterinsurgency: Led to the detentions of almost 50 individuals and a number of cache finds |
| Operation Eagle Dive I | 21 April 2007 | 21 April 2007 | Baghdad, just south in the Shubayshen area | Counterinsurgency: The effort netted 33 detainees, most suspected of building and planting bombs |
| Operation Polar Dive | 21 April 2007 | 21 April 2007 | the Shubayshen area, just south of Baghdad | Counterinsurgency: Detained three suspected terrorists and found a cache of bomb-making materials including wire, black powder, explosives manuals in English and Arabic, and chemistry textbooks |
| Operation Trident IV | 21 April 2007 | 21 April 2007 | the Shubayshen area, just south of Baghdad | Counterinsurgency: Detained six terror suspects and found a small weapons cache containing small arms and ammunition as well as 300 pounds of homemade explosive material and ball bearings for use in bombs |
| Operation Chalons | 23 April 2007 | 23 April 2007 | | Security: The cordon and search mission was conducted in an effort to secure a suspected Anti-Iraqi Forces weapons cache located in 3rd HBCT's operating area |
| Battle of Bismarck | 23 April 2007 | 24 April 2007 | Contact between Australian forces from Overwatch Battle Group (West) (OBGW-2) and insurgents | |
| Operation Eagle Dive II | 26 April 2007 | 26 April 2007 | Lutifiyah | Counterinsurgency: An operation intended to deny planned attacks on Patrol Base Lutifiyah. |
| Operation Forsythe Park | 28 April 2007 | 28 April 2007 | Ramadi | Counterinsurgency: Found numerous weapons and weapons caches |
| Operation Polar Scrum | 1 May 2007 | 1 May 2007 | Yusufiyah | Counterinsurgency: Resulted in 85 terror suspects detained and an improvised explosive device found during the all-day mission |
| Operation Rat Trap | 1 May 2007 | 1 May 2007 | Adhamiya | Counterinsurgency: Among those killed during the operation was Muharib Abdul Latif, the Senior Minister of Information of al-Qaeda-in-Iraq |
| Operation Eagle Thunder III | 2 May 2007 | 3 May 2007 | Mahmudiyah | Counterinsurgency: Soldiers found a weapons cache in the reed lines that consisted of homemade grenades |
| Operation Dragon Fire | 5 May 2007 | 6 May 2007 | Baghdad, the East Rashid security district | Counterinsurgency and law enforcement: To rid the Rashid District of terrorists and criminals and to protect the population |
| Operation Beach Yellow | 14 May 2007 | 14 May 2007 | Dura-iya | Security: Patrolled in search of terrorists and terrorist activity |
| Operation Southern Scimitar | 19 May 2007 | 2007 | Rutbah | Counterinsurgency: To sweep and clear their area of insurgent activity |
| Operation Valdez | 19 May 2007 | 19 May 2007 | Uybeaydat, south of Baghdad | Counterinsurgency: A mission to search for illegal weapons, explosives and high-value targets in the southern town |
| Operation Dragon Fire East | 26 May 2007 | May 2007 | Baghdad, the East Rashid security district | Counterinsurgency: Detained 3 suspected insurgents and found 2 weapons caches |
| Operation Red Eagle | 26 May 2007 | 26 May 2007 | Adhamiyah District | Counterinsurgency: To disrupt insurgent activity in the Suleikh neighborhood |
| Operation Safe Neighborhood | 28 May 2007 | 28 May 2007 | | Security: To make neighborhoods, markets, areas of congestion safer for the Iraqis |
| Operation Vipers Bite | 30 May 2007 | 30 May 2007 | the Al Izza district of Al Kut | Counterinsurgency: Resulted in the detainment of 13 people suspected of insurgent activities |
| Operation Alljah | June 2007 | June 2007 | Fallujah | Security: Was designed to turn Fallujah over to local Iraqi law enforcement by dividing the city up into manageable sections |
| Operation Safety and Security (Fahrad Al Amin) | June 2007 | June 2007 | | Counterinsurgency: To make sure al Qaeda and the insurgents have no safe sanctuary where they can rest, refit, stage, and plan for attacks |
| Operation Northern Forge | June 2007 | 7 June 2007 | | |
| Operation Northern Fury | June 2007 | June 2007 | | |
| Operation Cave Dweller | 1 June 2007 | 2007 | western Euphrates River valley | Security and Reconnaissance: US Marines searched and mapped all caves they found |
| Operation Eagle Sweep | 1 June 2007 | 1 June 2007 | Lutifiyah, northeast of, near the Karkh Oil Facility | Counterinsurgency: The searches resulted in four military-aged males being questioned, one of whom was a wanted insurgent |
| Operation Falkirk | 1 June 2007 | 1 June 2007 | | Counterinsurgency: To locate and detain suspected terrorists in Balad with ties to the kidnapping of two U.S. Soldiers taken captive. Resulted in a sustained firefight between the insurgents and US and Iraqi Special forces. Several women and children who had been hostage for more than a month were also freed. |
| Operation Hermes | 3 June 2007 | 3 June 2007 | Radwaniyah | Counterinsurgency: One of the homes had an SA-7 shoulder-fired surface-to-air missile system, and two men were detained and taken for questioning about the weapon. |
| Operation Polar Charade | 3 June 2007 | 3 June 2007 | southwest of Rushdi Mullah | Security and Counterinsurgency: Search for 2 missing Soldiers who were abducted 12 May in Quarghulli Village |
| Operation Brutus | 4 June 2007 | 4 June 2007 | Iskandariyhya | Counterinsurgency: Was an air assault mission focused on capturing or denying enemy sanctuary in the area |
| Operation Tiger Hammer | 7 June 2007 | 7 June 2007 | Baghdad, the Adhamiyah District | Counterinsurgency: The four-hour operation netted nine detainees and 38 illegal weapons |
| Operation Northwestern Shoulder | 12 June 2007 | 12 June 2007 | Sagrah, Hosfa and Zawiyah | Counterinsurgency and Humanitarian: Detained 10 Iraqis, searched for weapons and insurgent activity and performed several humanitarian projects |
| Operation Eagle Talon | 13 June 2007 | 13 June 2007 | Rusafa | Counterinsurgency: Recovered three AK-47 magazines, one shotgun and one chemical protective mask |
| Operation Phantom Thunder | 16 June 2007 | 2007 | Throughout Iraq | Counterinsurgency: An operation designed to defeat extremists in Iraq |
| Operation Marne Torch | 16 June 2007 | 2007 | Baghdad | Security: Focused on the security belts surrounding Baghdad |
| Operation Nijmegen | 16 June 2007 | 16 June 2007 | Baghdad | Counterinsurgency: Netted a cell leader with ties to persons of interest in the area southwest of the city. |
| Operation Ardennes | 17 June 2007 | 17 June 2007 | Muwayllihah | Counterinsurgency: Yielded two suspected insurgents wanted for their potential involvement in targeting Iraqi and Coalition Forces with bombs and for their involvement in sectarian violence |
| Operation Chosin | 17 June 2007 | 17 June 2007 | Dura'iya | Counterinsurgency: To disrupt key insurgent networks from freedom of maneuver in the battalion's area of operation. |
| Operation Destroyer Strike | 17 June 2007 | 17 June 2007 | Tuwaitha, near | Counterinsurgency: Coalition forces seized multiple weapons caches |
| Operation Chicken Coup | 17 June 2007 | 17 June 2007 | Route Bismarck, Iraq | Counterinsurgency |
| Operation Castine | 18 June 2007 | 18 June 2007 | Adhamiyah | Counterinsurgency: Resulted in the capture of three suspects caught with materials used in the manufacture of car bombs |
| Operation Arrowhead Ripper | 19 June 2007 | 19 June 2007 | Baqouba and its surrounding areas | Counterinsurgency: A large-scale effort to eliminate al-Qaeda in Iraq terrorists |
| Operation Commando Eagle | 21 June 2007 | 2007 | Baghdad, southwest of | Counterinsurgency: Targeted a series of houses which local citizens indicated were being used by al-Qaeda cells to intimidate them and launch attacks against Iraqi and Coalition Forces |
| Operation Chicken Coup II | 12 June 2007 | 12 June 2007 | Route Bismarck, Iraq | Counterinsurgency |
| Operation Sledgehammer | 22 June 2007 | 22 June 2007 | Jabella | |
| Operation Peregrine II | 23 June 2007 | 23 June 2007 | Mahmudiyah, a village outside | Counterinsurgency: Captured five members of an insurgent cell in north Babil |
| Operation Crazyhorse Thunder | 23 June 2007 | 23 June 2007 | Baghdad | Counterinsurgency: Seven suspects were detained for allegedly planting bombs along Route Tampa, the highway leading into Baghdad |
| Operation Blore Heath II | 24 June 2007 | 24 June 2007 | Al Dura'iya | Counterinsurgency: Cleared insurgent caches south of Salman Pak and southeast of Baghdad |
| Operation Bull Run | 24 June 2007 | 24 June 2007 | Al Dura'iya | Counterinsurgency: Part of Operation Marne Torch, the latest Coalition Force initiative to eliminate insurgent sanctuaries southeast of Baghdad |
| Operation Cobra Strike (2007) | 25 June 2007 | 28 June 2007 | Tibaj | Security: To establish a permanent combat outpost along with check points |
| Operation Council Grove II | 25 June 2007 | 25 June 2007 | Baghdad | Counterinsurgency: Detained six insurgents |
| Operation Golden Eagle II | 27 June 2007 | 27 June 2007 | Lutifiyah and Baghdad | Counterinsurgency: Was an early morning ground assault to prevent insurgents from creating a base of operations north of Lutifiyah |
| Operation Eagle Venture IV | 29 June 2007 | 30 June 2007 | between Mahmudiyah and Yusifiyah | Counterinsurgency: detained nine suspected insurgents while constructing a battle position |
| Battle of Donkey Island | 30 June 2007 | 30 June 2007 | outside Ramadi | Routine reconnaissance detects impending assault on Ramadi by 40 – 70 insurgents. US forces annihilate the insurgent force |
| Operation Eagles | July 2007 | July 2007 | | |
| Operation Guardian Torch | July 2007 | July 2007 | Arab Jabour | Counterinsurgency: Was designed to clear the area of al Qaeda and other insurgent forces |
| Operation Geronimo Strike II | July 2007 | July 2007 | | |
| Operation Justice Reach | July 2007 | July 2007 | | |
| Operation Nijemgen II | July 2007 | July 2007 | | |
| Operation Patriot Strike | July 2007 | July 2007 | | |
| Operation Dragon Hammer | 1 July 2007 | 1 July 2007 | Baghdad, Rashid District | Counterinsurgency: Baghdad troops detained more than 100 suspected insurgents and seized more than 200 weapons caches. |
| Operation Geronimo Strike | 3 July 2007 | 3 July 2007 | Kalsu's Fish Farms area | Counterinsurgency: Conducted to prevent insurgency operations and attacks |
| Operation Four Brothers | 6 July 2007 | 6 July 2007 | Arab Jabour | Counterinsurgency: Found money, weapons and detained numerous people for questioning |
| Operation Stampede 3 | 6 July 2007, on or about | 6 July 2007, on or about | | Counterinsurgency: Found several weapons caches including more than 80 mortar rounds, 10 rockets, 15 pounds of plastic explosives, several artillery rounds, fuses, blasting caps and other components to be used to make bombs |
| Operation Grenada | 7 July 2007 | 7 July 2007 | Babel, Northern portion | Counterinsurgency: Captured the ringleader of a cell responsible for conducting rocket and improvised explosive device attacks on the people and security forces of North Babil |
| Operation Safe Teach | 7 July 2007 | 7 July 2007 | Jisr Diyala | Security Operation: Task Force Marne Soldiers teamed with Iraqi Security Forces to provide security for Iraqi school children |
| Operation China Shop | 23 June 2007 | 30 June 2007 | North of Karmah | Counterinsurgency: Conducted in order to clear insurgents and weapons caches north of Karmah and Fallujah in areas that were previously unoccupied by Coalition Forces. |
| Operation China Shop II | 8 July 2007 | 8 July 2007 | North of Karmah | |
| Operation Eastern Fury | 10 July 2007 | 13 July 2007 | Fallujah | |
| Operation Geronimo Strike III | 10 July 2007 | 13 July 2007 | Iskandariyah, northwest of | Counterinsurgency: Conducted in order to capture members of an Al Qaeda cell wanted in connection with the kidnapping of three American Soldiers and other attacks against Iraqi and Coalition Forces |
| Operation Saber Guardian | 10 July 2007 | 11 July 2007 | Sherween | Counterinsurgency: Resulted in 20 al-Qaida terrorists killed, 20 detained, and two weapons caches and 12 bombs discovered |
| Operation Leyte Gulf | 11 July 2007 | 11 July 2007 | Mahmudiyah, south of | Counterinsurgency: A ring leader of a cell and 4 of his lieutenants responsible for conducting improvised explosive device attacks on the people and security forces of North Babil was captured |
| Operation Eagle Ares | 12 July 2007 | 12 July 2007 | Lutifiyah, east of | Counterinsurgency: Iraqi and U.S. Soldiers nabbed 46 men suspected of involvement with al Qaeda affiliated terror networks |
| Operation Waterfront | 13 July 2007 | 13 July 2007 | Al Anbar | Counterinsurgency |
| Operation Polar Tempest | 14 July 2007 | 14 July 2007 | al-Owesat and al-Thobat, the villages near | Counterinsurgency: Resulted in 12 men being detained for questioning on suspicion of terrorist activity. |
| Operation Bellicose Bastian | 15 July 2007 | 15 July 2007 | | Counterinsurgency: Ten suspected insurgents were arrested |
| Operation Ithaca | 15 July 2007 | 15 July 2007 | Haimer, Abu Nasim, and Jamil, near the villages of | Counterinsurgency: Resulted in 29 al-Qaida gunmen killed, 23 detained, eight hostages released, two weapons caches discovered and a safe house destroyed |
| Operation Mawtini | 15 July 2007 | July 2007 | Al Anbar province, western portion | Counterinsurgency: To neutralize any future attempts by insurgent Forces to re-establish a presence in key urban areas along the Euphrates River valley |
| Operation Punisher III | August 2007 | August 2007 | Al Anbar province | Counterinsurgency: Aimed at countering an insurgent surge of activity in the area, as well as disrupting the flow of weapons and other illegal items toward the urban areas. Was part of Operation Mawtini. |
| Operation Purple Haze | 15 July 2007 | 15 July 2007 | Baghdad, Jamiya'a neighborhood | Counterinsurgency: Discovered two caches totaling approximately 700 lb of homemade explosives |
| Operation Marne Avalanche | 16 July 2007 | 2007 | Baghdad | Counterinsurgency: An offensive operation aimed at stopping southern Baghdad from being used as a safe haven and preventing the movement of weapons, munitions and insurgents into Baghdad |
| Operation Ameliyet | 17 July 2007 | 17 July 2007 | Baghdad | Counterinsurgency: No weapons were found, but Soldiers and police officers learned there had been holes dug where weapons may have been stored previously |
| Operation Iraqi Home Protector | 22 July 2007 | 22 July 2007 | Riyadh | Peacekeeping |
| Operation Olympus | 22 July 2007 | 22 July 2007 | Anbakia | Counterinsurgency: Opened routes and cleared insurgents |
| Operation Iraqi Heart | 23 July 2007 | 23 July 2007 | Amman, Jordan | Humanitarian Operation: An Iraqi child received an operation in Amman, Jordan, to correct a heart defect known as Tetralogy of Fallot |
| Operation Rogue Thunder | 24 July 2007 | 24 July 2007 | Baghdad | Counterinsurgency: Outpost Established, Cache Discovered |
| Operation Iron Blitz | 26 July 2007 | 26 July 2007 | Baghdad, Northwest of | Counterinsurgency: Captured 25 suspected insurgents |
| Operation Woodshed | 26 July 2007 | 26 July 2007 | Samood Village, an area near Turki Village | Counterinsurgency: Killed 11 terrorists and detained 13 suspected terrorists |
| Operation Rogue Stomp | 29 July 2007 | 30 July 2007 | Baghdad, the Jamia Section | Counterinsurgency |
| Operation Pegasus Bridge | 30 July 2007 | 5 August 2007 | Al Anbar Province | Counterinsurgency: Numerous weapons caches, one of which consisted of 11 tons of ammonium nitrate, are among operational highlights. Dozens of enemy munitions, homemade explosives (HME) and rigged-to-blow Bombs were also uncovered and destroyed in place. |
| Operation Jalil | 31 July 2007 | August 2007 | Samarra | Counterinsurgency: More than 80 suspected terrorists have been detained |
| Operation New Blue | July 2007 | July 2007 | throughout Iraq | Security: Put residents in police stations to guard their own communities |
| Operation Wickersham II | August 2007 | August 2007 | | Counterinsurgency |
| Operation Wickersham | 1 August 2007 | 2 August 2007 | Baqouba, south of | Counterinsurgency: Was to clear an area used by al-Qaeda in Iraq to launch mortars into Baqouba. Named after the lead intelligence analyst for the Iraq Survey Group's Combined Media Processing Center, Adam Wickersham-US Army, who was injured in 2004 near Baqouba from a bomb. |
| Operation Winston-Salem | 1 August 2007 | 1 August 2007 | Baghdad, the Al Amin Section | Counterinsurgency: Captured four suspected insurgents and recovered materials for making bombs |
| Operation Firecracker | 7 August 2007 | August 2007 | the western Yarmouk neighborhood, Baghdad | Counterinsurgency: The operation was launched to seek out a suspected bomb-cell in the area. |
| Operation Hoplite | 4 August 2007 | 7 August 2007 | Had Maksar | Counterinsurgency: During the operation, two bombs were discovered in homes and destroyed; two weapons caches were discovered; four roadside bombs were discovered and reduced; and one al-Qaida vehicle was destroyed. |
| Operation William Wallace | 8 August 2007 | 8 August 2007 | Abu Tina | Counterinsurgency: To destroy al-Qaeda elements in the Abu Tina area |
| Operation Banzeen | August 2007 | August 2007 | Baghdad | Law enforcement: An effort to stop anyone affiliated with illegal militias from taking gasoline and then selling it on the black market. |
| Operation Lightning Hammer | 13 August 2007 | 2007 | Diyala River Valley | Counterinsurgency: A large-scale offensive to defeat al-Qaeda and other terrorist cells seeking safe haven. Was part of Operation Phantom Strike. |
| Operation Phantom Strike | 13 August 2007 | 2007 | throughout Iraq | Counterinsurgency: To eliminate remaining elements of AQI and other extremist groups, preventing them from causing further terrorism and inciting sectarian violence. Additionally, it will intensify pressure on extremist networks across the entire theater. |
| Operation Police Victory | 2007 | 2007 | | Objective:to force Al-Qaeda out of the town hit. The operation was completed by Master sergeant Martin Moore and the 5th Special Forces group. |
| Operation Pericles | 15 August 2007 | 15 August 2007 | Diyala River province | Counterinsurgency: The object of the operations was to sweep insurgents from the villages and palm groves of the province. |
| Operation Snake River | 15 August 2007 | 15 August 2007 | Hawr Rajab region | Counterinsurgency |
| Operation Marne Husky | 16 August 2007 | 16 September 2007 | Baghdad | Counterinsurgency: An aviation-based combat offensive targeting Sunni and Shiia military safe havens and weapons smugglers in the southern belts of Baghdad. The 3,900 U.S. troops in the area are focusing on choking the flow of Iranian-supplied bombs and weapons reaching the capital city. |
| Operation Chesterfield | 16 August 2007 | 16 August 2007 | New Baghdad District | Counterinsurgency: Captured one suspected insurgent and recovered a weapons cache including recovering two AK-47s, two pistols and 900,000 Iraqi dinar. |
| Operation Little Man Brief | 17 August 2007 | 17 August 2007 | Baghdad | Counterinsurgency |
| Operation Dragon Fox | August 2007 | August 2007 | Baghdad | Counterinsurgency: Found several Weapons caches |
| Operation Crimson Shogun | 20 August 2007 | 20 August 2007 | the Owesat and Fetoah areas, along the Euphrates River | Counterinsurgency: Thirteen men were detained for further questioning, one of whom was on the battalion's list of persons of interest. His brother was also detained, and was found by the Soldiers of Company A disguised as a pregnant woman in an attempt to avoid capture. |
| Operation Nijmegen II | 23 August 2007 | 23 August 2007 | Diyarah, north of | Counterinsurgency: 16 suspected members of a vehicle-borne improvised explosive device cell, with suspected links to al-Qaeda, were detained. |
| Operation Alabama | 23 August 2007 | 23 August 2007 | near Baghdad ? | Counterinsurgency |
| Operation Alaska | 24 August 2007 | 25 August 2007 | near Baghdad ? | Counterinsurgency |
| Operation Falcon Fury II | August 2007 | August 2007 | Baghdad | Counterinsurgency: Was an air assault mission conducted in support of Operation Marne Husky |
| Battle of Karbala | 27 August 2007 | August 2007 | Karbala | Battle: |
| Operation Combined Justice | August 2007 | August 2007 | | Counterinsurgency |
| Operation Powerline | 25 August 2007 | 25 August 2007 | throughout Iraq | Counterinsurgency: An operation to survey Iraq for downed power lines and watching for anyone violating the stand-off distance laws. |
| Operation Church | 27 August 2007 | 27 August 2007 | Gobia | Counterinsurgency: Netted several detainees, three caches containing 150 lb of home-made explosives, two 130 mm rounds, a ZU-23 with 2,000 rounds, a rocket-propelled grenade with eight rounds, a PKC, and seven AK-47s. |
| Operation Gecko | 28 August 2007 | 28 August 2007 | Jurf as Sakhr | Counterinsurgency: Tips from concerned citizens led Iraqi Coalition Forces to identify and destroy an enemy safehouse and discover a weapons cache. |
| Operation Street Sweeper II | 28 September 2007 | 30 August 2007 | Habbaniyah, outside of | Counterinsurgency: To rid the area of insurgents and their deadly tools. |
| Operation Eagle Chickmauga | 1 September 2007 | 1 September 2007 | Mahmudiyah | Counterinsurgency: 16 suspected insurgents were detained. |
| Operation Hit and Run | 1 September 2007 | 1 September 2007 | near Hawr Rajab | Counterinsurgency: Detained eight suspected al-Qaeda members and confiscated four AK-47 assault rifles |
| Operation Comanche Swarm III | 2 September 2007 | 2 September 2007 | Baghdad, East of | Counterinsurgency: Detained three people and seized a large cache of weapons |
| Operation Gator Inn | 2 September 2007 | 2 September 2007 | near Patrol Base Murray | Counterinsurgency: Discovered a weapons cache containing three AK-47 assault rifles, 14 mortar primers, six magazine carriers and 24 magazines. |
| Operation K | 2 September 2007 | 2 September 2007 | Baghdad, East of | Counterinsurgency |
| Operation Black Shark | 3 September 2007 | 3 September 2007 | Baghdad | Counterinsurgency: The operation, carried out by Soldiers of Company D, 1st Battalion, 8th Cavalry Regiment, was part of the continuous effort to sweep out insurgent strongholds. Soldiers also recovered two AK-47 assault rifles, one magazine and 707,000 Iraqi dinar, equal to about $600. |
| Operation Lightning Hammer II | 5 September 2007 | 5 September 2007 | throughout Iraq | Counterinsurgency: Search for alqaeda members throughout Iraq. |
| Operation Tuwaitha Sunrise | September 2007 | September 2007 | Tuwaitha, southeast of Baghdad | Counterinsurgency: To rid a major road of Bombs |
| Operation Wickersham III | 5 September 2007 | 5 September 2007 | Diyala province | Counterinsurgency: The operation, designed to remove al-Qaeda influence south of Buhriz, resulted in the discovery of three weapons caches and five bombs. Four detainees were located in the vicinity of a cache and were transferred to a facility for further questioning. |
| Operation Justice League | 6 September 2007 | 6 September 2007 | Khan Bani Sa'ad | Counterinsurgency: To drive Al-Qaeda out of the area. |
| Operation Rock Hammer | 7 September 2007 | 7 September 2007 | Baqouba, South of | Counterinsurgency: Was conducted in farmland and palm groves on the Diyala River, resulted in the discovery of 11 al Qaeda in Iraq weapons caches. |
| Operation Falcon Fury | 10 September 2007 | 10 September 2007 | Baghdad, south of | Counterinsurgency: Was an air assault mission that yielded three suspected militants who were detained after they were discovered with explosives. |
| Operation Tacoma III | 10 September 2007 | 10 September 2007 | New Baghdad | Counterinsurgency: The operation, carried out by Soldiers of Company C, 2nd Battalion, 16th Infantry Regiment, resulted in the recovery of two explosively formed penetrators, eight hand grenades, one rocket, 218 rounds of ammunition, three mortars and three rolls of wire. |
| Operation Greywolf Hammer II | 2007 | 2007 | | Counterinsurgency |
| Operation Gun Barrel City | 2007 | 2007 | | Counterinsurgency |
| Operation California | 12 September 2007 | 12 September 2007 | Near Mahmudiyah | Counterinsurgency |
| Operation Viking Clampdown III | 15 September 2007 | 15 September 2007 | | Counterinsurgency |
| Operation Arizona | 15 September 2007 | 15 September 2007 | | Counterinsurgency |
| Operation Dragon Talon II | 17 September 2007 | 17 September 2007 | Baghdad | Counterinsurgency: Captured 2 individuals suspected of anti-Coalition activities and the confiscation of several weapons caches. |
| Operation Marne Torch II | September 2007 | September 2007 | | Counterinsurgency |
| Operation Bethel | 19 September 2007 | 19 September 2007 | Hawr Rajab | Counterinsurgency: Detained insurgent suspects and destroyed weapons |
| Operation Lions Paw | September 2007 | September 2007 | throughout Iraq | Humanitarian: The release of 50 to 75 Iraqi detainies each day during Ramadan |
| Operation Viking Snatch | 20 September 2007 | 20 September 2007 | Sheik Hammad Village, near | Counterinsurgency: A weapons smuggler was detained and a cache of weapons was discovered containing two AK-47s, four magazines and two pistols with two magazines |
| Operation Gecko III A | 21 September 2007 | 21 September 2007 | Jurf As Sukhr | Counterinsurgency: A weapons cache was also discovered during the operation which contained two hand grenades, one 105 mm artillery round, one 81 mm mortar round, one PKC machine gun, one Dragunov sniper rifle, one Dushka heavy machine gun, three AK-47 assault rifles, two ammunition vests and other paraphernalia. The cache was destroyed on the scene. |
| Operation Bear | 29 September 2007 | 29 September 2007 | Baqouba | Counterinsurgency: An operation designed to look for weapons caches and insurgents. |
| Operation Gold Digger | 29 September 2007 | 29 September 2007 | Sheik Jamil | Counterinsurgency: Searched for weapons caches. |
| Operation Anchorage | 30 September 2007 | 30 September 2007 | east of FOB Falcon | Counterinsurgency: Discovered weapons and detained several suspected insurgents |
| Operation Hawaii II | 3 October 2007 | 4 October 2007 | Near Mahmudiyah | Counterinsurgency: searching weapons caches. |
| Operation Rock Drill | 5 October 2007 | 5 October 2007 | Muradiyah | Counterinsurgency: Discovered a large weapons cache in the village cemetery and detained two men. |
| Operation Eagle Shiloh III | 6 October 2007 | 6 October 2007 | Said Abdulla Corridor, west of Mahmudiyah | Counterinsurgency: Detained 17 suspected insurgents. |
| Operation Elfin Cove | October 2007 | October 2007 | | Counterinsurgency |
| Operation Belleau Wood | October 2007 | October 2007 | | Counterinsurgency |
| Operation Bell Hurriyah (Enjoy Freedom) | October 2007 | October 2007 | | Counterinsurgency |
| Operation Gecko IIIB | October 2007 | October 2007 | throughout Iraq | Counterinsurgency: Search for weapons caches and suspected insurgents. |
| Operation Bone Breaker | 15 October 2007 | 15 October 2007 | southeast Baqouba | Counterinsurgency: Captured one large weapons cache containing assorted weapons and ammunition, as well as two smaller caches containing home-made explosives. |
| Operation Ohio II | 17 October 2007 | 17 October 2007 | Near Mahmudiyah | Counterinsurgency: searching weapons caches. Some 60mm and 120mm Mortar rounds were found and destroyed by bomb teams. |
| Operation Kentucky | 20 October 2007 | 20 October 2007 | Near Mahmudiyah | Counterinsurgency: searching weapons caches. |
| Operation Hawaii III | 23 October 2007 | 24 October 2007 | Near Mahmudiyah | Counterinsurgency: searching weapons caches. |
| Operation Montana II | 12 November 2007 | 13 November 2007 | Near Mahmudiyah | Counterinsurgency: searching weapons caches with Iraqi Forces. |
| Operation Iron Reaper | 27 November 2007 | December 2007 | Northern Iraq | Counter Insurgency: To pursue al-Qaeda in Iraq and extremist elements from the region. |

== 2008 ==
| Battle/Operation name | From date | To date | Location | Purpose/Result |
|---|---|---|---|---|
| Operation Oklahoma | 8 January 2008 | 9 February 2008 | Near Mahmudiyah? | clearing houses. |
| Operation Marne Thunderbolt | January 2008 | 15 February 2008 | southeast of Baghdad | Security: Focused on pursuing the enemy and clearing al-Qaeda safe havens. Transitioned to Operation Marne Grand Slam in February 2008. |
| Operation Rock Reaper | January 2008 | 2008 | west of Baquba, Iraq | Counter Insurgency: Effort to clear Al-Qaeda strongholds |
| Operation Phantom Phoenix | 8 January 2008 | 2008 | southeast of Baghdad, Northern Iraq | Security: Focused on pursuing the enemy and clearing al-Qaeda safe havens |
| Operation Raider Harvest | 8 January 2008 | 2008 | southeast of Baghdad, Northern Iraq | Security: A sub operation of Operation Iron Harvest. |
| Operation Iron Harvest | 9 January 2008 | 2008 | Northern Iraq | Counter Insurgency: To pursue al-Qaeda in Iraq and extremist elements from the region. A sub operation of the corps-level offensive Operation Phantom Phoenix |
| Operation Marne Grand Slam | 15 February 2008 | 15 March 2008 | southeast of Baghdad | Security: Focused on pursuing the enemy and clearing al-Qaeda safe havens. Transitioned to Operation Marne Rugged in March 2008. |
| Operation Marne Rugged | 15 March 2008 | 2009 | southeast of Baghdad | Security: Focused on pursuing the enemy and clearing al-Qaeda safe havens. |
| Operation Sawlat al-Fursan (Charge of the Knights) | 24 March 2008 | 2009 | al Qurnah, Iraq | Counter Insurgency: Targeting criminal elements by the Iraqi Army and Iraqi Security Forces |
| Operation Estonia | 29 March 2008 | 30 March 2008 | the cities of Hamza and Hashmiyah, Iraq | Counter Insurgency: detained numerous criminals and found two caches |
| Operation Manchu Harvest III (Salah ad Din) | 4 April 2008 | 2008 | Salah ad Din Province, Iraq | Counter Insurgency: discovered a large weapons cache |
| Operation Marne Piledriver | 15 April 2008 | 2008 | the Mahmudiyah area | Peacekeeping and Counterinsurgency: Purpose was to combat insurgency and stimulate economic growth and development throughout the Mahmudiyah Qada |
| Operation Restore Peace VI | 18 May 2008 | 18 May 2008 | Forward Operating Base McHenry, Iraq | Counter Insurgency: To reconcile with combatants. Reported a 90% drop in violence in certain areas. |
| Operation Lions Roar | 19 May 2008 | 19 May 2008 | the Younis al-Sabawi neighborhood of Mosul, Iraq | Counter Insurgency: Discovered a cache consisted of more than 100 mortar rounds, more than 100 mortar fuses, two mortar tubes, two mortar bipods, one suicide vest, two rockets and eight mines. |
| Operation Balad Musalahah | 22 May 2008 | 2008 | Balad area | Counter Insurgency: Allowing reconciliation of insurgents. |
| Operation Siegfried Line | 24 May 2008 | 24 May 2008 | southern Baghdad, Iraq | Counter Insurgency: detained numerous suspected criminals in the Bayaa community |
| Operation Gravel Dump | 28 May 2008 | 28 May 2008 | Karma, Iraq | Counter Insurgency: Joint USMC/Iraqi Army search of gravel trucks for smuggled weapons. |
| Operation Spring Break | May 2008 | May 2008 | Lake Tharthar, Iraq | Counter Insurgency: 4 day joint operation between U.S. Marines and Iraqi Army scouts. |
| Operation al Salam, (Peace) | 20 May 2008 | 2009 | Sadr City, Iraq | Counter Insurgency |
| Operation Lion Hunt | 6 June 2008 | 6 June 2008 | Ninewah province, Iraq | Counter Insurgency: the first unilateral Iraqi-led aerial operation conducted by the 11th brigade, 3rd Iraqi Army division. |
| Operation New Town | 10 June 2008 | 10 June 2008 | Shakriyah, Iraq | Counter Insurgency: an air assault census mission conducted by the 22nd brigade, 6th Iraqi Army division |
| Operation Iron Roundup II | 2008 | 6 July 2008 | provinces north of Baghdad—Diyala, Salah ad Din, Kirkuk and Ninewa | Counter Insurgency: discovered weapons caches and detained three suspected terrorists |
| Operation Lions Paw | 2008 | 2008 | throughout Iraq | Counter Insurgency:During the Ramadan month, between fifty and seventy Iraqis will be released from U.S. detention centers in Iraq each day |
| Operation Defeat Al Qaeda in the North | 2008 | 2008 | Anbar Province, Salah Ad Din Province, Ninewa Province | Counter Insurgency |
| Operation Iron Pursuit | 29 July 2008 | 11 August 2008 | Diyalah province | Counter Insurgency |
| Operation Eagle North | 8 August 2008 | 8 August 2008 | Abu Osage Village of the Sa'id Abdullah Corridor | Counter Insurgency: to find and detain suspected criminals throughout the area |
| Operation Monmouth | 27 August 2008 | 27 August 2008 | Habbash Village | Counter Insurgency: search for weapon caches and suspected criminals |
| Operation Viper Pursuit | 1 August 2008 | 30 August 2008 | the Sulayman Bak area | Counter Insurgency: to search for insurgent activity |

== 2009 ==
| Battle/Operation name | From date | To date | Location | Purpose/Result |
|---|---|---|---|---|
| Operation Iron Gator | 14 January 2009 | 2009 | Salman Pak | Security and Humanitarian: A series of projects totaling $2 million to improve the security and infrastructure of Salman Pak, southeast of Baghdad. |
| Operation Goodwill | 23 January 2009 | 2009 | Maysan province | Humanitarian: distribution of food, toys and medical supplies to poor Iraqis in the rural villages of Maysan province, to include the villages of Amarah and Abu Romanah. |
| Operation Wolf Pursuit | February 2009 | 2009 | Diyala Province | Operation Wolf Pursuit was a joint US and Iraqi operation aimed at targeting insurgents in rural areas of Diyala Province, and the rural southern area of Balad Ruz specifically. Coalition and Iraqi Security Forces intended to enter rural areas, clear them of insurgents, and then build combat outposts to maintain security and oversee the development of the rural areas. |
| Operation New Hope | 21 February 2009 | 2009 | Mosul | Operation New Hope was a military offensive with joint US and Iraqi participation that began on 21 February 2009. The operation's objective was to degrade Al-Qaeda in Iraq's capabilities in Mosul, the capital of the northern province of Ninewah. It also intended to follow up on arrest warrants, carry out search-and-raid operations in parts of Mosul, and reinforce the presence of security forces. In the first evening hours of the offensive, 84 suspects were arrested on suspicion of involvement in terrorism. |
| Operation Ninewa Resolve | 14 April 2009 | 2009 | Neighborhoods in Ninewa | Operation Ninewa Resolve was a subset of Operation New Hope. As part of the operation, Coalition and Iraqi forces partnered to clear insurgents from neighborhoods in Ninewa's capital city of Mosul. After the neighborhood was cleared, a holding force was put into place to prevent the return of insurgents. Once the neighborhood was secured, the holding force began quick-impact projects to employ Iraqis and spur economic development and reconstruction. |
| Operation Glad Tidings of Benevolence II | 2009 | 2009 | | The operation consisted of clearing areas in search of weapons caches, checking identification for known criminals and bringing humanitarian assistance to local communities. |
| Operation Legion Pursuit II | 2009 | 2009 | Diyala Province | The top three key tasks of Legion Pursuit II were to project and sustain Iraqi Security and Coalition forces in the villages of Abu Bakr and Abu Awad, Diyala Province, Iraq and to conduct a detailed census of the towns and to provide humanitarian assistance to bolster ISF and local national relations. |

== 2010 ==
| Battle/Operation name | From date | To date | Location | Purpose/Result |
|---|---|---|---|---|
| Operation New Dawn | August 2010 | 18 December 2011 | Iraq | Umbrella term for U.S. operations in Iraq after August 2010. |
| Battle of the Palm Grove | 10 September 2010 | 13 September 2010 | Hudaidy, Diyala, Iraq | Iraqi police and army supported by American trainers engaged in a four-day indecisive engagement with insurgents. |

== 2011 ==
| Battle/Operation name | From date | To date | Location | Purpose/Result |
|---|---|---|---|---|
| Operation New Dawn | August 2010 | 18 December 2011 | Iraq | Umbrella term for U.S. operations in Iraq after August 2010. |

== See also ==
- Casualties of the Iraq War
- Civil war in Iraq (2006–07)
- Iraqi insurgency
- Task Force ODIN
- United States casualties of war

== Sources ==
Iraqi sources

- Iraq Diaries – Iraqis writing about their experiences of war.
- The Ground Truth Project – A series of exclusive, in-depth interviews with Iraqis, aid workers, military personnel and others who have spent significant time on-the-ground in Iraq.
- What Iraqis Think – A compilation of the latest polls and blogs coming out of Iraq.

Casualties

(additional links not found in Casualties links section)

- "Iraqi Civilian Deaths Increase Dramatically After Invasion" Johns Hopkins School of Public Health, 28 October 2004.
- "One-Day Toll in Iraq Combat Is Highest for U.S. in Months", Washington Post, 19 October 2006.
- U.S. Military Personnel Wounded in Iraq & Afghanistan: A Running Log.
- Moving a Nation to Care: Post-Traumatic Stress Disorder and America's Returning Troops by Ilona Meagher, Introduction by Penny Coleman, foreword by Robert Roerich, M.D.

Combat operations related

- "Aerial Propaganda Leaflet Database". Psywar.org, 6 November 2005. (ed. Iraq War PSYOP leaflets and posters)

News

- Electronic Iraq: Daily news and analysis from Iraq with a special focus on the Iraqi experience of war.
- News from Iraq: Aggregated news on the war, including politics and economics.
- The Struggle for Iraq: BBC Best Link: All the latest news, analysis and images from Iraq.
