= Operation Oasis =

Operation Oasis may refer to:

- The 1947 deportation of Jews captured by the British on the SS Exodus.
- An American humanitarian operation in Iraq in 2004. List of coalition military operations of the Iraq War
