= Operation Sledgehammer (2007) =

2007 US military search operation in Iraq

- Part of Iraq War
Date	22 June 2007
Location	Jabella, Iraq
Result	American capture of suspected terrorists and weapons detained

Belligerents
United States	Iraqi insurgency

Casualties and losses
None	8 captured 10 82mm mortar rounds detained ten 102mm mortar rounds detained 2 improvised explosive devices detained

Operation Sledgehammer (2007) was a military search operation during the 2003 Iraq war. The search was carried out in an attempt to disrupt militia influence and violence in the town of Jabella, Iraq 22 June 2007.

== Operation details ==
During the operation eight individuals were detained between the Iraqi Army, the Hillah Special Weapons and Tactics Team, and Coalition Forces.

Military transition team Paratroopers from the 425th Brigade Special Troops Battalion, 4th Brigade Combat Team (Airborne), 25th Infantry Division and Iraqi Security Forces searched the offices of Martyr Sadr and found ten 82mm mortar rounds, ten 102mm mortar rounds, and two improvised explosive devices.

== Participating Units ==
=== American Units ===
- 425th Brigade Special Troops Battalion, 4th Brigade Combat Team (Airborne), 25th Infantry Division

=== Iraqi Units ===
- The Iraqi Army
- the Hillah Special Weapons and Tactics Team

== See also ==
- Operation Marne Torch
- Operation Arrowhead Ripper
