= Operation Valiant Guardian =

2007 operation during the Iraq War

Date	5 April 2007 – 5 May 2007
Location	Al Anbar province, Iraq
Result	Uncovered over 250 caches, arrested over 250 suspected insurgents and discovered over 100 IED's

Belligerents
United States; Republic of Iraq	Iraqi Insurgents

Commanders and leaders
Lt. Col. Michael Manning	

Strength
4,000	

Operation Valiant Guardian began in 2007 and was part of the Iraq War.

== Background ==
Regimental Combat Team 2 and elements of the Iraqi Army's 7th Division completed Operation Harris Ba’sil after eight weeks of interdicting and disrupting enemy routes and safe havens outside of the major cities of the Euphrates River valley in western al Anbar province.

The operation, dubbed "Valiant Guardian", involved nearly 4,000 marines, soldiers and sailors covering most of the 30,000 square miles (78,000 km^{2}) of RCT-2's operating area.

"We uncovered over 250 caches, arrested over 250 suspected insurgents and discovered over 100 improvised explosive devices,” said Lt. Col. Michael Manning, operations officer for RCT-2. "We clearly surprised them, the number of caches and detainees attest to that but more importantly, we let the enemy know that they can’t hide from us."

This marked the first large scale operation for RCT-2 this year, supporting Multi-National Force – Iraq's Operation Farhd al Qanoon and utilizing the surge battalions sent to the Anbar Province. RCT-2's operating area stretches from the Syrian border city of Al Qa’im down to the town of Hit, located northwest of Ramadi.

== Units ==
=== United States Units ===
- Regimental Combat Team 2

=== Iraqi Units ===
- 7th Division
