= Operation Mawtini =

Iraq war U.S. milatary operation

- Part of the Iraq War
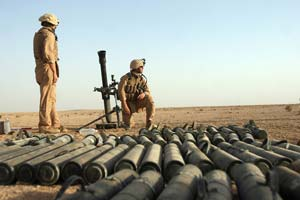
- Two Marines, watch the sun go down while standing on the gun line before combined arms training as part of the first week of the operation.
Date	15 July 2007
Location	Western Al Anbar, Iraq

Belligerents
United States; Iraqi Army	Iraqi insurgency

Commanders and leaders
(Iraq) Abboud Qanbar (United States) David Petraeus	Unknown

Strength
Over 9,000	Unknown

Casualties and losses
None	Unknown

Operation Mawtini was launched on 15 July 2007 by the Regimental Combat Team 2, located in western Al Anbar province, to neutralize attempts by anti-Iraqi Forces to re-establish a presence in key urban areas along the Euphrates River valley.

The operation called for over 9,000 U.S. Marines, soldiers, and sailors, along with elements of the Iraqi Army, to strike deep into the less-traveled regions of RCT-2's operating area.

== History ==
Operation Mawtini, which included the Iraqi Army's 2nd and 3rd Brigades of the 7th Division, began on the heels of Operation Harris Ba’sil which had provided a better picture of enemy movement patterns and safe havens. The information gained during Harris Ba’sil allowed the Regiment to conduct focused disruption and security operations in those areas critical to the enemy.

== Participating units ==
=== American units ===
- United States Army
- United States Marine Corps
- United States Navy

=== Iraqi units ===
- 2nd Brigade, 7th Division
- 3rd Brigade, 7th Division
