= Operation Saber Guardian =

2007 military operation

- Part of Iraq War
Date	10 July 2007 – 11 July 2007
Location	Sherween, Iraq
Result	Coalition victory

Belligerents
United States; Iraq	Islamic State of Iraq; Other Iraqi Insurgents

Strength
Not Reported	Not Reported

Casualties and losses
Not Reported	20 killed 20 captured 2 weapon caches detained 12 explosives detained

Operation Saber Guardian was a joint operation between 3rd Battalion, 3rd Brigade, 5th Iraqi Army soldiers, local concerned citizens, and 6-9 Armored Reconnaissance Squadron, 3rd Brigade Combat Team, 1st Cavalry Division. The operation, targeted at Islamic State of Iraq leadership near the town of Sherween, Iraq, resulted in 20 ISI terrorists killed, 20 detained, and two weapons caches and 12 improvised explosive devices discovered.

== Background ==
In mid-October 2006, al-Qaeda announced the creation of Islamic State of Iraq (ISI), replacing the Mujahideen Shura Council (MSC) and its al-Qaeda in Iraq (AQI).

The operation began early Tuesday morning with close air support engaging three river crossings and one bridge with eight 2,000 pound bombs and 14-500 pound bombs. The locations are used by Islamic State of Iraq to conduct their attacks and were engaged to prevent their escape.

"This operation was very important for the people of Sherween because they were able to find a very big hideout for the terrorists," said Staff Maj. Gen. Abdul Kareem, commander of Iraqi Security Forces in Diyala province. "It was a very big surprise for the terrorists and the people that support them."

The people of Sherween played a vital role in this operation as they fought side by side the ISF to help them capture and kill known terrorists.

Members of the IA also cleared a local mosque, a suspected terrorist haven, and identified mortar tubes, a mortar cache, small-arms munitions, a sniper rifle and machine guns. The other weapons cache included small-arms munitions and IED-making materials.

"The political impact will strengthen the local population's confidence in the IA and the local government," said Maj. John Woodward, 6-9 ARS executive officer. "It will also facilitate Sunni Resistance fighting in the Muqdadiyah area as the people have grown tired of the destruction al-Qaida offers."

"Such an operation will have a very big impact on the future of Diyala," said Kareem. "This will serve as lessons for the terrorists and their supporters.

"Now they will start thinking there is no safe haven," Kareem continued. "The ISF and CF will follow them wherever they go."
