= Operation Tiger Hammer =

Part of Iraq war

- Part of Post-invasion Iraq, 2003–present
Date	7 June 2007
Location	the Adhamiyah District Baghdad, Iraq
Result	The four-hour operation netted nine detainees and 38 illegal weapons

Belligerents
United States	Iraqi insurgency

Casualties and losses
None	9 captured

Operation Tiger Hammer was part of the Iraq War that began in 2003. Iraqi Army soldiers conducted a battalion-sized cordon and search operation in the Adhamiyah District of the Iraqi capital 7 June.

The combined mission, dubbed Operation Tiger Hammer, was conducted by elements of the 1st and 3rd battalions of the 1st Brigade, 11th Iraqi Army Division with support provided by Multi-National Division – Baghdad Soldiers from Company C, 1st Battalion, 26th Infantry Regiment, operating in Baghdad with the 2nd Brigade Combat Team, 82nd Airborne Division.

The four-hour operation netted nine detainees and 38 illegal weapons.

Just after sunrise, the U.S. troops established blocking positions around the neighborhood while the Iraqi units fanned out through the narrow streets, searching houses and apartment complexes room-by-room for weapons and contraband.

"This just shows the commitment of the Iraqi Army to protecting the people of Adhamiyah by going after criminals and terrorists who want to create instability and hinder progress," said Capt. Leon McGill, of Waynesville, Missouri, a U.S. military transition team advisor.

No US deaths were reported during the operation.
