= 2004 Good Friday ambush =

Attack on US troops by Iraqi insurgents

Coordinates: 33.264168°N 44.235279°E

- Part of the Iraq War
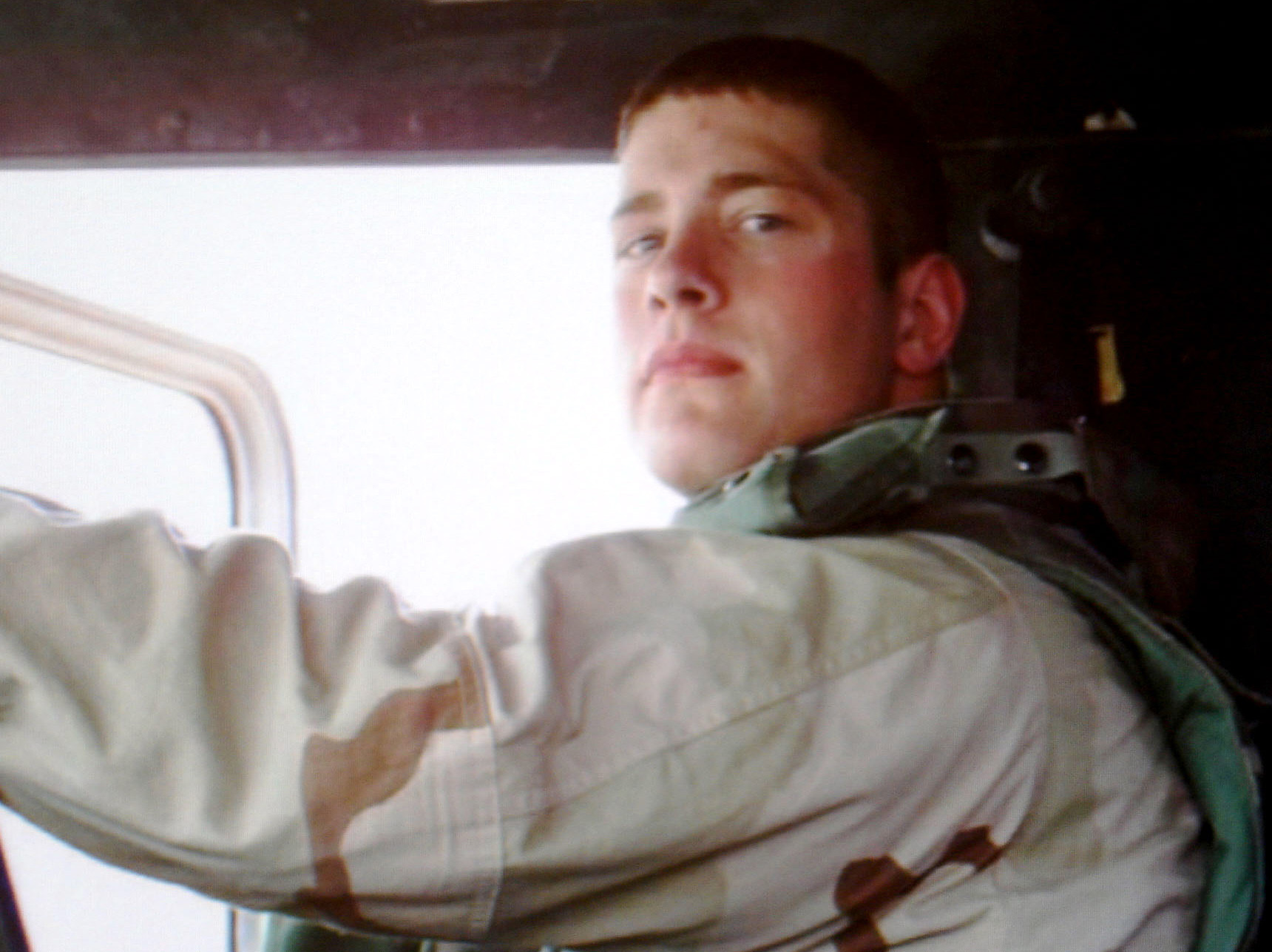
- Keith Matthew Maupin, a U.S. Army soldier who was captured in the attack and later executed.
Date	April 9, 2004; 22 years ago
Location	Iraq, Baghdad
Result	Insurgent & Mahdi Army victory

Belligerents
United States; U.S. Army; KBR, Inc.	Jama'at al-Tawhid wal-Jihad; Mahdi Army

Commanders and leaders
(United States) Matthew Brown (executed)	Unknown

Casualties and losses
8 killed 16 wounded 1 missing 2 captured (1 executed) Total: 27 Killed and wounded	Unknown if any

The 2004 Good Friday ambush was an attack by Iraqi insurgents on April 9, 2004 during the Iraq War on a convoy of United States supply trucks during the Battle of Baghdad International Airport. It happened in the midst of the Iraq spring fighting of 2004, which saw intensified clashes throughout the country.

== History ==
On April 5, 2004, Shia Muslim cleric Muqtada al-Sadr called for a jihad against coalition forces and Thursday night, April 8, his Mahdi Militia dropped eight bridges and over-spans around Camp Scania, thus severing the northbound traffic into the Sunni Triangle. He was hoping to starve the 1st Cavalry Division of fuel and ammunition. Consequently, the 724th Transportation Company was tasked to haul fuel to the north gate of Baghdad Airport from Camp Anaconda, 60 miles away the next morning - Good Friday and the first anniversary of the U.S. capture of Baghdad. Unknown to the truck drivers, elements of the 1st Cavalry Division had pushed militants into the suburbs of Abu Graib, through which the convoy had to travel. Up until this time, the convoy ambushes consisted of four or five insurgents firing on passing convoys with rocket-propelled grenades and small arms. The reaction to enemy contact at the time was to return fire and clear the area.

That morning, five vehicles of the 724th armed with crew-served weapons escorted a convoy of 17 fuel trucks and two bobtail tractors operated by U.S. defense contractor KBR. En route, the convoy ran through a well planned, large-scale ambush that included improvised explosive devices, rocket-propelled grenades and small arms, believed to be from one or more of al-Qaeda in Iraq, the Badr Organization, and the Mahdi Army. Convoy commander Lieutenant Matthew Brown was wounded in the head and blacked out, leaving his driver, Private First Class Jeremy Church, to lead the convoy to safety. The attack damaged or destroyed numerous convoy vehicles and those that made the turn on the overpass drove through the mob of insurgents that had been driven into the neighborhood the day before. Church reached the safety of a dairy factory where a company of tanks waited. He then led a rescue of the stranded trucks and remained in the ambush area when the Humvee he was riding in was full of wounded. Tanks drove the length of the area while scout vehicles recovered Church and Specialist Patrick Pelz. Five civilian contractors and one U.S. Army soldier were killed. PFC Gregory R. Goodrich was killed by small arms fire during an intense firefight for which he received the Bronze Star. Twelve soldiers and four KBR drivers were wounded. Three civilian contractors, Thomas Hamill, Timothy Bell and William Bradley, and U.S. Army soldiers Sergeant Elmer Krause and Private First Class Keith Matthew Maupin, disappeared. Hamill escaped from his captors and was recovered by U.S. forces 27 days later. Bradley's body was recovered in January 2005. Krause's body was recovered on April 23 and Maupin was held captive for an undetermined time before being murdered.

== Aftermath ==
On Good Friday, the Iraqi insurgents ambushed every convoy that tried to drive in or out of the Baghdad Airport. The ambush of the 724th Transportation Company was the deadliest convoy ambush of the entire war. No other transportation company suffered as many casualties in one ambush. That Easter weekend was a turning point in the war in Iraq for convoy ambushes. For the next year the insurgents would spar with the truck drivers for control of the road. As vehicle armor improved along with convoy tactics, the insurgents suffered heavy casualties during the Palm Sunday Ambush on March 20, 2005, which inspired them to resort more to improvised explosive devices as weapon of choice. Maupin's fate remained unknown until 2008, when his remains were found. Timothy Bell remains missing and is presumed dead.

Private First Class Jeremy Church was the first truck driver and Army Reserve soldier to receive the Silver Star Medal since the Vietnam War.

After the ambush, several hundred KBR drivers quit and flew home, forcing the 13th Corps Support Command to find licensed military drivers to drive the tankers. Many of those KBR drivers who remained would continue driving for several more years. KBR then renegotiated its contract with the military standardizing the minimum requirement for convoy escort.

Family members of two of the wounded and one of the killed civilians later sued KBR, charging that the company had knowingly placed its employees in a battle zone in spite of promises not to do so. Six other families of KBR drivers killed in Iraq later joined the suit. In April 2009, U.S. District Judge Gray Miller ruled that the plaintiffs could continue their suit against KBR and allowed KBR to include Iraqi insurgent forces in the case. The court ruled that the U.S. Army was not liable. KBR appealed the ruling. KBR has asked retired U.S. Army Lieutenant General Ricardo Sanchez to testify on the company's behalf.

In early 2010, KBR notified the U.S. Army that it would bill the U.S. government for any damages awards or legal expenses it incurred in relation to contract work it did in Iraq. In December 2011, KBR settled out-of-court with one of the injured drivers, Reginald Cecil Lane, for an undisclosed amount.

One of the contractors, Steven Fisher, a native of Brooklyn, New York who lived in Virginia Beach, Virginia, was killed as a result of the attack. He was carried by other contractors he worked with and bled to death in the entrance of the Baghdad International Airport from three gunshot wounds. He was 43 years old and a father of three children.

With fuel transportation operations significantly compromised as a result of this ambush, the 454th Transportation Company was dispatched from FOB Speicher (Tikrit) to sustain the Central Iraq fuel supplies. The unit sustained six days of combat under extremely stressful conditions. After delivering their first fuel load of approximately 300k gallons of JP8 from FOB Speicher to BIAP, the unit was required to load fuel from a retail fuel location requiring 24+ hour load times at CSC Scania. This was repeated over six days until ordered to return home by the 13th COSCOM. Without this emergency fuel mission and the unit's ability to adapt, Central Iraq operations would have ground to a halt and the Mahdi Militia would have accomplished their original mission.

== Legacy ==
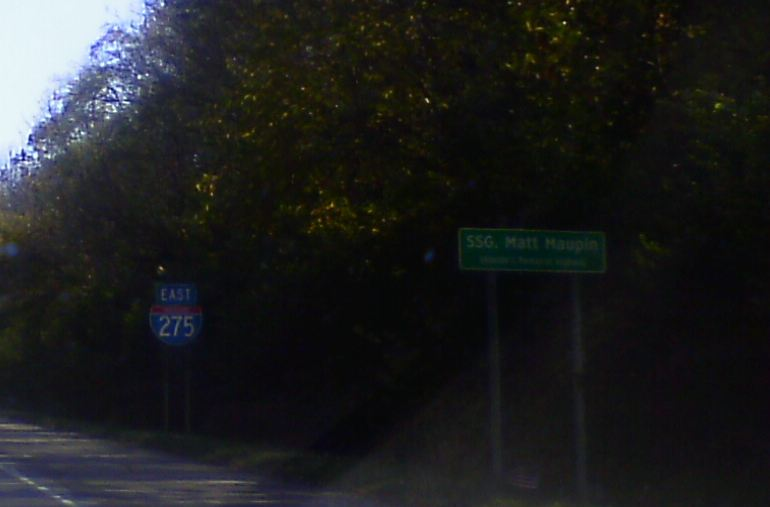
Staff Sergeant Matt Maupin Memorial Freeway

Maupin was the first U.S. soldier to be missing in action during the Iraq War.

An informant in 2008 reported to ECP3 Baghdad, Iraq, to show the location of SSG Matt Maupin.

After his death was confirmed in 2008, Interstate 275 in his native Clermont County, Ohio was officially renamed Staff Sergeant Matt Maupin Memorial Freeway.

== See also ==
- Ahmed Kousay al-Taie - A U.S. Army soldier who was captured by Iraqi insurgents and murdered.
- Wassef Ali Hassoun - A U.S. Marine who claimed to be captured by Iraqi insurgents; later discovered to be a hoax.
- American POWs in the 2003 invasion of Iraq
- June 2006 abduction of U.S. soldiers in Iraq - Capture and murder of Kristian Menchaca and Thomas L. Tucker, two U.S. Army soldiers
- Karbala provincial headquarters raid - Capture and murder of Brian Freeman, Jacob Fritz, Jonathan Chism and Shawn Falter, four U.S. Army soldiers
- May 2007 abduction of U.S. soldiers in Iraq - Capture and murder of Alex Ramon Jimenez, Joseph John Anzack and Byron Wayne Fouty, three U.S. Army soldiers
