= May 2007 abduction of United States soldiers in Iraq =

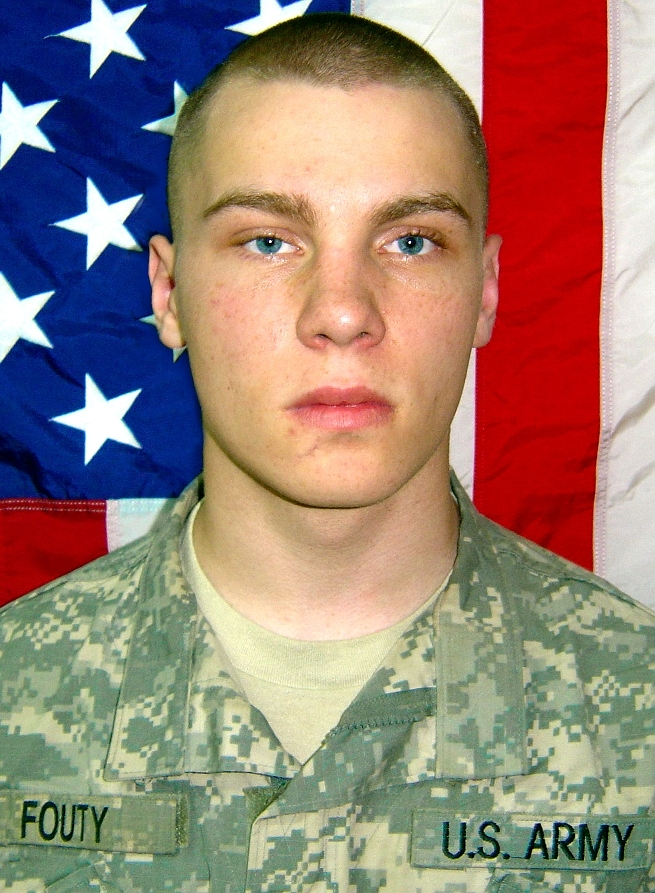
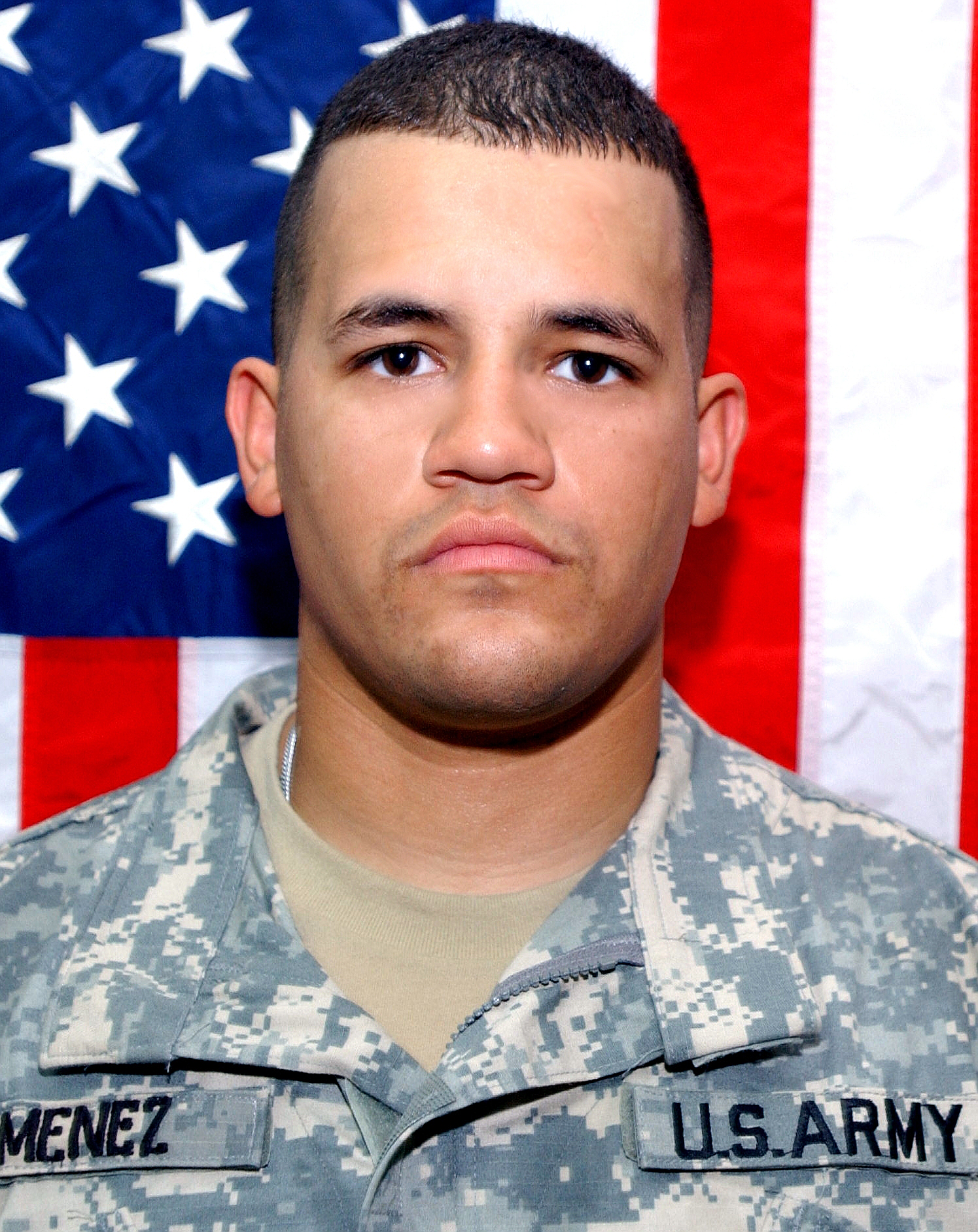
Private Byron Wayne Fouty, USA (left) and Specialist Alex Ramon Jimenez, USA (right).

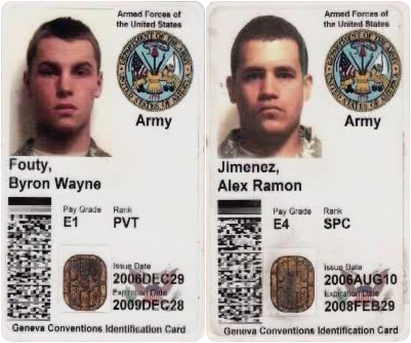
Iraqi insurgents released images of the Common Access Cards of two of the soldiers in early June 2007

The May 2007 abduction of American soldiers in Iraq occurred when Iraqi insurgents attacked a military outpost in Al Taqa, Iraq, killing four U.S. Army soldiers and an Iraqi soldier before capturing Private Byron Wayne Fouty, Specialist Alex Ramon Jimenez, and Private First Class Joseph John Anzack Jr. on May 12, 2007.

== Background ==
In March 2003, the United States, United Kingdom, Australia, and Poland had invaded Iraq to depose its Ba'ath Party government led by Saddam Hussein, and, when that was accomplished, in May 2003 decided to stay on in Iraq to "bring order to parts of that country that remain[ed] dangerous".

Even in 2006 and 2007, the new Iraqi governments, installed in June 2004 and May 2006 and supported by U.S. and British forces, were still facing strong domestic and terrorist opposition, from groups whose identity was not always certain. Islamic State of Iraq (ISI) was a Sunni Islamic militant group that in 2003–2004, under an earlier name, had chosen as killing targets Shia Islamic mosques and civilians, Iraqi government institutions, and the U.S.-led Multi-National Force in Iraq.

The U.S. 4th Battalion, 31st Infantry Regiment, 2nd Brigade, 10th Mountain Division, arrived in Iraq in September 2006, had until May 2007 already lost 18 of its members killed in action, and was living in Iraq under hard conditions, when it was, in May 2007, charged with a military observation post outside Mahmudiyah in the notoriously dangerous area known as the Triangle of Death, south of Baghdad.

== Attack on U.S. military post ==
On the night of 11–12 May 2007, the aforesaid U.S. military observation post near Mahmoudiyah, with two armored Humvees, 165 feet apart and facing in opposite, outward, directions, each with four soldiers, seven of them U.S., one Iraqi soldier, sat guard, looking for insurgents planting explosives, and was ambushed and attacked by a group using automatic weapons and explosives. Initial reporting stated that PFC Murphy was wounded but survived the initial attack along with the other three captured soldiers, but refusing to surrender and continued struggling upon attempted capture, was executed on the spot by the attackers.

== Casualties and abductions ==
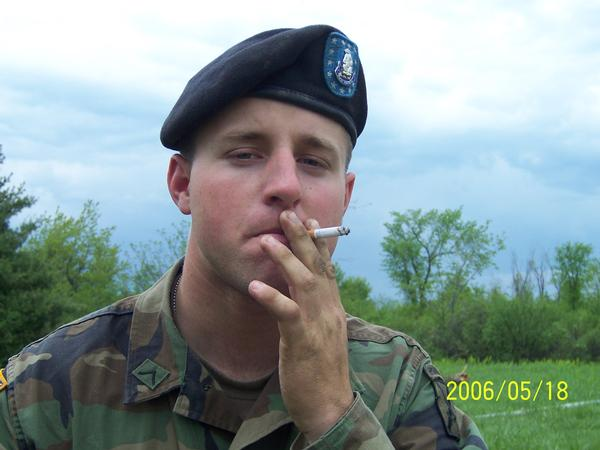
Private First Class Joseph John Anzack Jr., one of the captured soldiers.

Four U.S. Army soldiers and the Iraqi soldier-interpreter were killed:

SFC James David Connell Jr., aged 40;
PFC Daniel Weston Courneya, aged 19;
PFC Christopher Edward Murphy, aged 21;
SGT Anthony Jason Schober, aged 23.

Three U.S. soldiers were abducted/captured:

PVT Byron Wayne Fouty, aged 19.
SPC Alex Ramon Jimenez, aged 25; and
PFC Joseph John Anzack Jr., aged 20;

== Claim by Islamic State of Iraq ==
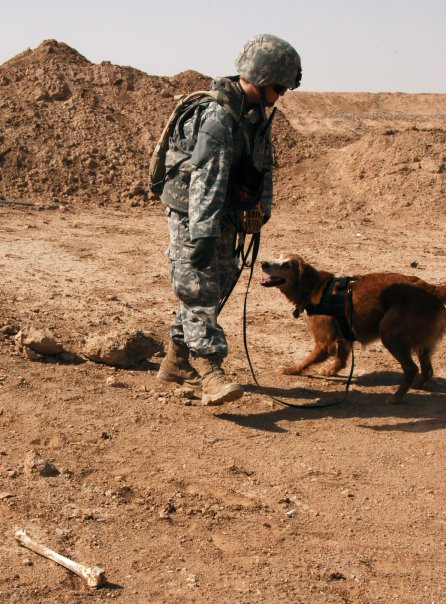
A U.S. contractor and her dog search for Private Byron Wayne Fouty, Specialist Alex Ramon Jimenez, Private First Class Joseph John Anzack after their capture.

- Before 19 May 2007, 'an al Qaeda-affiliated group' claimed to be holding Anzack, Jimenez and Fouty, says ABC News;
- at unspecified moment, Islamic State of Iraq (ISI), a group that includes Tanzim Qaidat al-Jihad fi Bilad al-Rafidayn (often referred to as "al-Qaida in Iraq" or AQI) claimed the May 12 ambush, says CNN;
- 'a group with reported ties to al-Qaida' at unspecified moment claimed responsibility for the May 12 ambush, says website mysanantonio.

== Search for soldiers; Anzack dead ==
4,000 U.S. Army troops started searching for the three captured soldiers, and searched in Iraqi homes. On 19 May they raided a building in Amiriyah, 25 miles from the place of the ambush, and arrested nine suspects. Before 21 May, Iraqi forces rounded up 250 people as part of the search, 15 of them were processed into U.S. detention facilities, the rest into Iraqi detention. At a not specified moment, Islamic State of Iraq (ISI) called on the U.S. military to halt its search for the missing soldiers. On 23 May, Anzack's body was pulled out of the Euphrates River, with a gunshot wound in the head.

== ISI video proving involvement ==
On 4 June 2007, Islamic State of Iraq (ISI) posted a 10-minute video on Internet. It shows footage of what appears to be the planning stage of the 12 May attack and of apparently the attack itself; a recorded broadcast of TV network Al-Jazeera of soldiers searching fields; and it contains an audio commentary in Arabic, saying: "We decided to put an end to this matter and announce the death of the soldiers" purportedly because the U.S. military did not heed their demand to end the search for the soldiers. The video shows the photos of the military identification cards of Jimenez and Fouty, with above the photos written in Arabic: "Bush is the reason for the loss of your prisoners", and also shows credit cards and other personal items of them, while a voice says: "They were alive and then dead".

On 9 June 2007, coalition forces raided a suspected "al-Qaida in Iraq" (AQI) house near Samarra (125 km north of Baghdad) and discovered those ID cards of Jimenez and Fouty.

== Bodies of Fouty and Jimenez found ==
Over a year later, on 9 July 2008, a suspect led authorities to the shallow grave of Jimenez and Fouty, 20 km (12.5 miles) south of the ambush site. Their remains were flown to the U.S. On 10 July, the Armed Forces Medical Examiner (AFMES) identified them as Jimenez and Fouty.

== See also ==
- Ahmed Kousay al-Taie, a U.S. Army soldier who was captured by Iraqi insurgents and executed
- Wassef Ali Hassoun, a U.S. Marine who claimed to be captured by Iraqi insurgents, later discovered to be a hoax
- United States prisoners of war in the 2003 invasion of Iraq
- 2004 Iraq KBR convoy ambush, capture and execution of Keith Matthew Maupin, a U.S. Army soldier
- June 2006 abduction of United States soldiers in Iraq, capture and execution of Kristian Menchaca and Thomas L. Tucker, two U.S. Army soldiers
- Karbala provincial headquarters raid, capture and execution of Brian Freeman, Jacob Fritz, Jonathan Chism and Shawn Falter, four U.S. Army soldiers
