= Ahmed Kousay al-Taie =

American soldier (1965–2008)

Ahmed Kousay Al-Taie
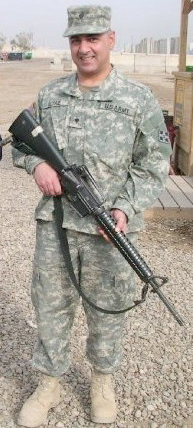
- Born: 22 July 1965; Iraqi Republic
- Disappeared: 23 October 2006; Baghdad, Baghdad Governate, Iraq
- Died: 2008 (aged 42–43); Iraq
- Cause of death: Gunshot wounds
- Spouse: Linda Racey
- Military career
- Allegiance: United States
- Branch: United States Army
- Service years: 2004–2008
- Rank: Staff sergeant (promoted in absentia)
- Units: Provincial Reconstruction Team, Baghdad
- Conflicts: Iraq War

Ahmed Kousay Al-Taie (Arabic: أحمد قصي الطائي; 22 July 1965 – 2008) was a United States Army soldier who was kidnapped in October 2006 in Baghdad and later killed by his captors; he was the last missing U.S. serviceman from the Iraq War to be recovered.

== Early life and education ==
Al-Taie was born in Iraq on 22 July 1965, to Kousay and Nawal Altaie. At the age of nine, he emigrated with his family from Iraq to the United Kingdom before moving to the United States, settling in Ann Arbor, Michigan. He was of mixed Sunni and Shia parentage.

== Career ==
Al-Taie enlisted in the United States Army Reserve in December 2004. He was mobilized in August 2005 and deployed to Iraq in November 2005. During his tenure in the United States Army, Altaie served as a linguist.

=== Prisoner of war ===
On 23 October 2006, Al-Taie left his military base in Iraq without authorization or the knowledge of his superiors. It is believed that he was in the Karrada neighborhood in central Baghdad, Iraq to visit the family of his second wife, Israa Abdul-Satar, a student at al-Mustansiriya University. He was captured by armed men and forced into a waiting vehicle outside.

On 2 November 2006, a ransom demand for Altaie was relayed to his uncle Entifadh Qanbar, a former spokesman for the Iraqi National Congress and recently an official in the Iraqi Ministry of Defense. Qanbar made contact with an intermediary trusted by the kidnappers. In a secret location in Baghdad, the mediator met with members of the group who showed Qanbar a grainy video on a cell phone screen of a man they claimed was Altaie, beaten up and bloody, and demanded $250,000 from the soldier's family to secure his release.

Qanbar stated that he would not talk about a price until he had seen for himself some proof that Altaie was still breathing. Qanbar suggested they have his nephew describe the inside of his home in Ann Arbor or that the kidnappers photograph the soldier holding a current newspaper by 4 November 2006 at 12:00pm.

The U.S. government said on 11 November 2006 that it was offering a US$50,000 reward for information leading to the recovery of Altaie's body.

On 14 February 2007, a proof of life video of Al-Taie was posted on a militant Shiite website. A previously unknown group called the "Ahel al-Beit Brigades" claimed responsibility for Altaie's abduction. The eight second video showed Altaie reading from a paper but no audio was heard. He appeared thin but in good health. His uncle identified him as the man in the video.

Al-Taie was the last U.S. serviceman to be accounted for in Iraq. He was captured when he was the rank of specialist and was promoted to sergeant, then staff sergeant.

On 26 February 2012, U.S. military officers informed Ahmed Al-Taie's family that he was confirmed dead. An examination of his remains found that he had been shot once in the torso and once in the neck after being severely beaten. The remains of Al-Taie were turned over as part of an amnesty exchange agreement between the Iraqi government and the militant group Asa'ib Ahl al-Haq. Al-Taie's family believes he was killed in 2008.

== Personal life ==
Al-Taie's first wife was Linda Racey of Farmington Hills, Michigan.

== See also ==
- Wassef Ali Hassoun – A U.S. Marine who claimed to be captured by Iraqi insurgents; later discovered to be a hoax
- American POWs in the 2003 invasion of Iraq
- 2004 Iraq KBR convoy ambush – Capture and execution of Keith Matthew Maupin, a U.S. Army soldier
- June 2006 abduction of U.S. soldiers in Iraq – Capture and execution of Kristian Menchaca and Thomas L. Tucker, two U.S. Army soldiers
- Karbala provincial headquarters raid – Capture and execution of Brian Freeman, Jacob Fritz, Jonathan Chism and Shawn Falter, four U.S. Army soldiers
- May 2007 abduction of U.S. soldiers in Iraq – Capture and execution of Alex Ramon Jimenez, Joseph John Anzack and Byron Wayne Fouty, three U.S. Army soldiers
- List of kidnappings
- List of solved missing person cases (2000s)
