= Terrorist incidents in Iraq in 2003 =

In 2003, there were 30+ suicide bombings executed by 32 attackers.

== February ==
- February 26: A suspected Ansar al-Islam member detonated a suicide vest at a checkpoint in Zamaqi, northern Iraq, killing four.

== March ==
- March 13: A suspected Ansar al-Islam suicide bomber blew himself up in northern Iraq targeting the Kurdish political leadership.
- March 22: Three people were killed, including Australian cameraman Paul Moran, and nine others injured when a suicide car bomber blew himself up at a checkpoint in Said Sadiq, northeast Iraq.
- March 29: Iraqi soldier Ali Jaafar Musa Hammadi al-Numani killed four U.S. soldiers in a suicide car bombing attack at a military checkpoint near Najaf.
- March 29: A failed attempt by a suicide car bomber that tried to attack U.S. military convoy in central Iraq heading for Baghdad.

== April ==
- April 3: Two Iraqi female suicide bombers killed three U.S. Army Special Operations soldiers at a checkpoint 11 miles southwest of Haditha Dam in Al Anbar province. Wadad Jamil Jassem and her accomplice Nour Qaddour al-Shanbari, a pregnant woman who was also killed in the attack, exited the vehicle prior to the explosion and began screaming in fear. The three soldiers approached the vehicle believing the pregnant woman needed assistance, when suddenly the women detonated a bomb hidden inside the vehicle.
- April 4: A Fedayeen suicide car bomber attempts an attack on a U.S. military convoy in Baghdad.
- April 6: A would-be suicide bomber belonging to the Fedayeen Saddam paramilitary group gets killed by Coalition forces after a failed attempt to attack U.S. military convoy near Baghdad.
- April 10: A suicide bomber walked up to a U.S. military checkpoint in central Baghdad and blew himself up, killing one U.S. soldier and wounding four U.S. Marines.
- April 12: A suicide bomber attacked a U.S. military checkpoint in Baghdad, killing one and wounding five.

== August ==
- August 7: Jordanian embassy bombing in Baghdad: A bus bombing outside the embassy killed 17 people.
- August 19: Canal Hotel bombing: in Baghdad, killed 22 people (including the top United Nations representative Sergio Vieira de Mello) and wounds over 100.
- August 29: Imam Ali mosque bombing: One or two car bombs, possibly detonated by suicide bombers, exploded outside the Imam Ali Shrine in Najaf. Between 85 and 125 people were killed, including the leader of the nation's Shia community Grand Ayatollah Mohammed Baqr al-Hakim.

== September ==
- September 3: A suicide bomber attacked a U.S. military base in Ramadi killing 2 people and wounding 2.
- September 9: A suicide car bomber targeted the U.S. intelligence headquarters in the northern city of Erbil, killing three people and injuring 41, including six U.S. Department of Defense personnel.
- September 22: A suicide car bomber blew himself up near the UN HQ in Baghdad, killing a security guard and wounding 19 people.

== October ==
- October 9: In the first attack on an Iraqi police station, a suicide car bomb exploded outside a station in Sadr City, killing at least eight people.
- October 12: One or two suicide car bombs near the Baghdad Hotel killed six Iraqis and wounded more than 30 others, including three US soldiers.
- October 14: A suicide car bomb exploded outside the Turkish embassy in Baghdad, wounding two security guards.
- October 16: A would-be suicide vehicle bomber was killed by security services before he could attack the Interior Ministry building in Irbil.
- October 27: 2003 Baghdad bombings: Four or five suicide car bombings rocked Baghdad, killing 30-40 people including, two US soldiers. The deadliest attack was on the HQ of the International Committee of the Red Cross, where a suicide bomber driving an ambulance killed 12 people and wounded 20. The other attacks targeted Iraqi police stations.
- October 28: A suicide car bomber blew himself up 100 yards from a police station in Fallujah, killing four people.

== November ==
- November 12: 2003 Nasiriyah bombing: A suicide car bombing in the southern town of Nasiriyah killed about 30 people. The target was an Italian military base; 19 of the dead were Italians.
- November 20: A suicide truck bomb exploded outside the office of the Patriotic Union of Kurdistan, a US-allied Kurdish political party in Kirkuk. Four people were killed and 30 wounded.
- November 22: Two suicide car bombers struck police stations in the towns of Khan Bani Saad and Baquba almost simultaneously, killing at least 18 people and leaving over 30 wounded.
- November 29: Seven Spanish agents of the Centro Nacional de Inteligencia were killed in an ambush near Latifiya, 20 miles south of Baghdad.

== December ==
- December 9: Suicide bombers, one in a car and another on foot, blew themselves up at the gates of two US military bases, wounding 61 American soldiers.
- December 10: Three suicide bombers attacked the HQ of the 82nd Airborne Division in Ramadi. One US soldier died and 14 others were wounded.
- December 14: Hours before the US military announced that they captured Saddam Hussein, a suspected suicide car bomber killed 16 police officers and two civilians outside a police station in Al-Khalidiya, 60 miles west of Baghdad.
- December 15: On the northern outskirts of the Iraqi capital, a suicide bomber driving a four-wheel-drive taxi killed eight policemen at their station in Husainiyah. Just hours before, in the Ameriyah neighbourhood of the city, eight policemen were injured by another suicide car bomber.
- December 17: A suicide truck bomber, who was trying to attack a police station in the al-Bayaa district of Baghdad, collided with a bus at an intersection killing at least ten people and wounding 20.
- December 18: A VBIED attacked a civilian convoy on MSR Hershey at approximately 0700 hours as they were leaving their encampment to go to work near Bayji. A South African armored personnel carrier was destroyed in the process. Several injuries, but no US personnel - military or civilian - were killed.
- December 24: A suicide bombing killed four and wounds over 100 at the Interior Ministry offices in Arbil.
- December 27: 2003 Karbala bombings: Five Bulgarian soldiers and two Thai soldiers were among 19 people killed and 18 injured in a coordinated attack on coalition military bases in Karbala. Four suicide car bombers struck a Bulgarian base, a compound containing the city hall and police HQ, and a multinational logistics base run by Polish, Thai, and American soldiers.
- December 31: Five Iraqis are killed and at least 21 people were injured by a car bomb which targeted a restaurant popular with Westerners in Baghdad. At least three buildings were destroyed by the explosion.
