= 2003 Latifiya ambush =

Latifiya ambush
- Part of Iraq War
Date	29 November 2003
Location	Latifiya, Mahmudiya District
Result	Insurgent victory

Belligerents
Spain: National Intelligence Centre	Iraqi insurgents

Commanders and leaders
(Spain) Alberto Martinez † (Spain) Carlos Baró †	Unknown

Strength
8 officers	Dozens

Casualties and losses
7 killed	Unknown

In late November 2003, Iraqi insurgents ambushed a two-car convoy carrying eight Spanish intelligence officers in Latifiya, killing all but one of them, who later escaped.

== Ambush ==
On November 29, 2003, two vehicles returned from Baghdad to Al Diwaniyah on a reconnaissance mission. Each of the two cars had four officers belonging to the National Intelligence Centre, led by Officer Alberto Martinez; next to him was José Merino; and in the back seat were José Lucas and Ignacio Zanón. The second vehicle had Alfonso Vega, Carlos Baró, José Carlos Rodríguez, and José Manuel Sánchez.

The team took a road that goes from one village to another on a long journey to reach Mahmoudiyah. Having arrived in Latifiya before 3:30 pm, 30 miles south of Baghdad, an insurgent car following up with the Spanish vehicles sped up and began shooting the convoy. The second car sped up to warn the front team of the attack, but the insurgents followed up with the first car and began opening fire, killing Martinez and wounding Lucas.

The insurgents then attacked the second car with a hail of bullets, driving the car out of the road. The remaining passengers of the first car managed to take control of their vehicle and headed towards the second. Carlos Baró took over the command and attempted to call for help from Diwaniyah, but he was shot. The remaining team attempted to fight back with their guns and Steyr machine pistols; however, they were no match for the insurgents, and by then all officers were dead except Sánchez. The fighting has lasted for more than 20 minutes.

== Aftermath ==
Shortly after, a crowd of Iraqis swarmed down the area and began chanting slogans supporting Saddam Hussein. The crowd dragged the corpses of the dead officers and kicked them; however, Sanchez was spared, taken to a nearby police station, and left for Diwaniyah.
