= Ali Al Tamimi =

Iraqi politician

Ali Al Tamimi علي التميمي

Governor of Baghdad Governorate
- In office 2013–2017

Personal details
- Born: Baghdad, Iraq
- Occupation: Politician

Ali Mohsen Hudal Al Tamimi (Arabic: علي التميمي, born 1975 in Baghdad) is an Iraqi politician and former governor of Baghdad.

Al Tamimi was a member of the "House of Representatives" of the Sadrist Movement and elected in 2013 to the post of governor of Baghdad. On 19 January 2016 the Baghdad Provincial Council voted to remove him from office because of corruption charges. On 6 March 2016, Atwan Al Atwani of the State of Law Coalition was elected the new governor of Baghdad.
