= Battle of Baghdad International Airport =

2004 battle of the Iraq War

- Footage of the battle shot by US soldiers
Date	April 11, 2004
Location	Baghdad, Iraq
Result	United States Army victory

Belligerents
United States	Mahdi Army

Commanders and leaders
CPT Peter Glass; 2LT James McCormick; SGT Christopher Lehman	Muqtada al Sadr

On Easter Sunday April 11, 2004, a battle was fought at Baghdad International Airport (BIAP) in Iraq primarily between United States Army truck drivers, air defense artillerymen, armor, military policemen, engineers and miscellaneous logistics personnel against militants from Muqtada al Sadr's Mahdi Army, along the Southwest side of the airport wall in an area commonly referred to as Engineer Village. That section of Baghdad International Airport was home to numerous engineering units, in particular the 389th Combat Engineers, a dining hall, and a convoy marshaling area.

== History ==
Footage of the battle shot by U.S. soldiers

U.S. Army-produced documentary about the battle

On April 5, 2004, the radical young cleric Muqtada al Sadr called for a jihad against coalition forces and wanted to gain control of Al Kut, An Najaf and Sadr City. This led to widespread fighting throughout the Sunni Triangle. His militia was outmatched by the M1 Abrams tanks of the 1st Cavalry Division, however they knew that the Abrams tanks were dependent on resupply trucks. On Thursday night, April 8, the militia destroyed eight bridges and overpasses around Convoy Support Center Scania thus halting all northbound traffic into the Sunni Triangle. The coalition forces in Iraq maintained seven days of supply and were involved in heavy fighting thus expending ammunition and fuel at an alarming rate. With the main supply route cut, the clock was ticking.

The southwest corner of BIAP, known as Engineer Hill, served as a major truck stop south of Baghdad. Because of the lack of supervision, truck drivers like to stop and relax there. An estimated 200 trucks parked there on the day of the battle with two drivers assigned to each truck. Centrally located, the 1st Cavalry Division also drew its supplies from those convoys. The 4-5th Air Defense Artillery provided perimeter security for the compound and surrounding area, which included Entry Control Point (ECP) 7 as the entrance to the southwest corner of BIAP. Up until that time, convoy ambushes consisted of improvised explosive devices (IED) or four or five Iraqis firing on a passing convoy. The main response had been to return fire, speed up and clear the kill zone as fast as possible. This Easter weekend would introduce large scale convoy ambushes. To differentiate the difference, small ambushed became known as simple and larger known as complex.

On the evening of April 8, Second Lieutenant James L. McCormick's Humvee gun truck, Zebra, of the 1486th Transportation Company, fought off an enemy ambush at the turn into BIAP for about 20 minutes with him and SPC Brandon Lawson was seriously wounded. After medical treatment, both returned to their convoy. This may have been the first complex ambush of the war. The enemy realized that they were no match for the Abrams tanks but knew the soft underbelly of the armored division was its dependence upon trucks for everything it needed to fight with. The next day, Good Friday and the anniversary of the fall of Baghdad, the Iraqis ambushed every convoy that tried to enter or leave Baghdad International Airport including the ambush of the 724th Transportation Company. The next day all roads were coded black meaning that any convoy expected imminent attack. With no more convoys venturing out, the militia decided to attack the trucks where they parked.

By Easter Sunday, April 11, several hundred trucks parked behind the southwest wall of BIAP defended by the C Battery, 4-5 Air Defense Artillery. By then, the 1st Cavalry Division was 48 hours from mission failure and required emergency resupply of fuel and ammunition. A fuel convoy of the 706th Transportation Company (POL) ventured out of BIAP and was ambushed. Hearing the driver's pleas for help over the radio, Lieutenant McCormick ordered his gun truck crew to head out the gate (ECP7) to assist the convoy while the beleaguered drivers reported that they were nearly out of ammunition. About that time, an Apache helicopter was shot down during its effort to suppress the enemy. As the gun truck Zebra crew approached the gate, the guards said they could not leave the compound. As the Zebra gun truck was returning to its assembly area, the crew noticed that no vehicle on the ramp overlooking the wall closest to the gate. The ADA posted an AN/TWQ-1 Avenger on every ramp except the one closest to the gate because the ADA had parked an M6 Bradley Linebacker outside the gate. At lunch, the militia fired upon the adjacent guard tower. McCormick then ordered his driver, Corporal Bryan Noble, to drive on the ramp in time to engage the three sappers approaching the wall and then held back a larger force of black-clad militia waiting to rush through the whole in the wall that the sappers were attempting to make. That began the battle.

The five crew members of the Zebra then held off over 50 Iraqi militants at the irrigation ditch 50 meters away alone for the next five to ten minutes while less than a dozen truck drivers came running to their assistance. A couple more Humvee gun trucks pulled up along with an M915 tractor and trailer gun truck, Eve of Destruction II, armed with an Mk 19 grenade launcher. For the next 45 minutes, the enemy concentrated their attack on that section of wall occupied by a handful of truck drivers, and a handful of truck drivers fought back against intense small arms fire and repeated volleys of rocket propelled grenades. Lt McCormick organized the defense in his sector and maintained that stance throughout the initial and most critical phase of the assault totally throwing the enemy into confusion.

The M6 Linebacker outside the gate to their left and truck drivers crowded around a Humvee on the dirt ramp two hundred meters to their right provided flanking fire toward the fleeing enemy who was pushed back and attempting to flea on an access road to the right. Military Police of the 501st Military Police Company, 1st Armored Division joined the truck drivers on the other ramp. Intermittent breaks in .50 Caliber M2HB fire mounted on a Humvee on the ramp to the right were halted to allow Sergeant Bryant, a 1AD 501st MP sergeant, to fire three consecutive AT-4 rounds into the enemy location that was captured on video along with the actions of Lt McCormick and his crew. Later four Humvees of F Battery, 202nd Air Defense Artillery returned to the gate and added their flanking fire to the fight. Lieutenant Jason Coad of the C Battery, 4-5 ADA arrived to organize the defense behind the wall. Several soldiers at the mess hall were firing towards the wall in a panic nearly hitting the Zebra gun truck crew and others defending the camp. Lt Coad and his swift actions undoubtedly prevented significant friendly fire as the camp was packed with military and civilian truck drivers taking cover under and behind their trucks. Late in the battle, a HETS convoy hauling tanks from the 1st Armored Division arrived at the gate and a colonel climbed up in the guard tower to assume control of the battle.

The colonel instructed McCormick to back his Zebra off the ramp and bring up Sergeant Christopher M. Lehman's Humvee gun truck with a Mk 19 grenade launcher because McCormick's M2 Browning .50 caliber machine gun could not hit the enemy mortar position behind a set of buildings. After coming off of the ramp, McCormick then organized the fight around the Humvee. Running low on small arms ammunition, he asked for ammunition and eventually Private First Class Mealer of the 1487th Transportation Company carried a helmet of loose 5.56 ammunition. They then loaded magazines and conducted volley fire while directing the MK19 on targets.

Finally, Captain Peter Glass’ C Troop, 3-8 Cavalry arrived and replaced the gun trucks on the ramps with his M1 Abrams tanks which ended the enemy resistance after 45 minutes of fighting. 30 minutes after this fight, Lt McCormick and his crews were given a convoy security mission to the green zone after replenishing ammunition they escorted four convoys into the green zone back to back fighting through 3 complex ambushes not losing any US personnel or equipment but were credited with killing more than 20 enemy fighters, Private First Class Brian Noble the Zebra driver was wounded in the face by small arms fire and remained in the fight the entire day, for his heroism Noble was recommended for the Silver Star and never received any recognition for his actions.

== Aftermath ==
Thirty minutes after having defeated the enemy attack, the crew of the Zebra fought through three more ambushes to escort convoys with critical ammunition to the Green Zone for the 1st Cavalry Division. All but one of the five crew members was wounded that weekend, but all remained with their gun truck. With other emergency convoys of fuel and ammunition, the 1st Cavalry Division was able to beat back the al Sadr April Uprising.

Twelve Bronze Star Medals and four Army Commendation Medals were awarded to truck drivers for this battle. McCormick finally received the Silver Star Medal in 2014 ten years after the battle. This battle ranks as one of the greatest feats of heroism in the Iraq war of the US Army Transportation Corps.
