= Mahmudiyah rape and murders =

2006 US war crimes in Iraq

- Part of the Iraq War
- Location: 33.06°N 44.22°E; Yusufiyah, Baghdad Governorate, Iraq
- Date: 12 March 2006; 20 years ago
- Target: Abeer Qassim Hamza al-Janabi
- Attack type: War rape; Mass murder; War crime
- Deaths: 4
- Perpetrators: Four U.S. Army soldiers from Bravo Company, 1st Battalion, 502nd Infantry Regiment, 2nd Brigade, 101st Airborne Division (Air Assault): Steven Dale Green; James P. Barker; Paul E. Cortez; Jesse V. Spielman (as a lookout)
- Motive: Rape; Witness elimination Anti-Arab racism
- Convictions: Green: Rape and multiple counts of murder; Barker: Rape and murder; Cortez: Rape, conspiracy to rape, and four counts of murder; Spielman: Rape, conspiracy to commit rape, housebreaking with intent to rape, and four counts of felony murder
- Sentence: Green: Life in prison; Barker: 90 years in prison; Cortez: 100 years in prison; Spielman: 110 years in prison

The Mahmudiyah rape and murders were a series of war crimes committed by four United States Army soldiers during the U.S. occupation of Iraq, involving the gang-rape and murder of 14-year-old Iraqi girl Abeer Qassim Hamza al-Janabi and the murder of her family on 12 March 2006. It occurred in the family's house to the southwest of Yusufiyah, a village to the west of the city of Mahmoudiyah, Iraq. Other members of al-Janabi's family murdered by U.S. soldiers include her 34-year-old mother Fakhriyah Taha Muhasen, 45-year-old father Qassim Hamza Raheem, and six-year-old sister Hadeel Qassim Hamza al-Janabi. The two remaining survivors of the family, al-Janabi's 9-year-old brother Ahmed and 11-year-old brother Mohammed, were at school during the massacre and orphaned by the event.

Five U.S. Army soldiers of the 502nd Infantry Regiment were charged with rape and murder: Specialist Paul E. Cortez (born December 1982), Specialist James P. Barker (born 1982), Private First Class Jesse V. Spielman (born 1985), Private First Class Bryan L. Howard, and Private First Class Steven Dale Green (2 May 1985 – 17 February 2014). Green was discharged from the U.S. Army for mental instability before the crimes were known by his command, whereas Cortez, Barker, and Spielman were tried by a military court martial, convicted, and sentenced to decades in prison. Green was tried and convicted in a U.S. civilian court and sentenced to life in prison. He committed suicide in early 2014.

== Background ==
Abeer Qassim Hamza at the age of seven

Abeer Qassim Hamza al-Janabi (Arabic: عبير قاسم حمزة الجنابي ‘Abīr Qāssim Ḥamza al-Janābī; 19 August 1991 – 12 March 2006) lived with her mother and father (Fakhriya Taha Muhasen, 34, and Qassim Hamza Raheem, 45, respectively) and her three siblings: 6-year-old sister Hadeel, 9-year-old brother Ahmed, and 11-year-old brother Mohammed. Of modest means, Abeer's family lived in a rental one-bedroom house in the village of Yusufiyah, which lies west of the larger township of Al-Mahmudiyah, Iraq.

Reportedly, before the incident Abeer had endured repeated sexual harassment from some U.S. soldiers. Abeer's home was situated approximately 200 meters (220 yards) from a six-man U.S. traffic checkpoint, southwest of the village. Soldiers were said to often watch Abeer doing her chores and tending the garden, as her home was visible from the checkpoint. A neighbor had warned Abeer's father about this behavior beforehand, but he replied that it was not a problem as she was just a young girl. Abeer's brother Mohammed (who along with his younger brother was at school at the time of the murders and thus survived) recalls that the soldiers often searched the house. On one such occasion, Private First Class Steven D. Green ran his index finger down Abeer's cheek, which had terrified her. Abeer's mother told her relatives before the murders that, whenever she caught the soldiers staring at Abeer, they would give her the thumbs-up sign, point to her daughter and say, "Very good, very good." Evidently this had concerned her and she made plans for Abeer to spend nights sleeping at her uncle's (Ahmad Qassim's) house.

In an interview conducted in February 2006, a month before the murders, Green told The Washington Post:

I came over here because I wanted to kill people. The truth is, it wasn't all I thought it was cracked up to be. I mean, I thought killing somebody would be this life-changing experience. And then I did it, and I was like, "All right, whatever." I shot a guy who wouldn't stop when we were out at a traffic checkpoint and it was like nothing. Over here, killing people is like squashing an ant. I mean, you kill somebody and it's like "All right, let's go get some pizza."

== Rape and murders ==
On 12 March 2006, soldiers at the checkpoint (from the 502nd Infantry Regiment)—consisting of Green, Specialist Paul E. Cortez, Specialist James P. Barker, Private First Class Jesse V. Spielman, and Private First Class Bryan L. Howard—had been playing cards, illegally drinking caffeinated alcoholic drinks (whiskey mixed with an energy drink), hitting golf balls, and discussing plans to rape Abeer and "kill some Iraqis." Green was very persistent about "killing some Iraqis" and kept bringing up the idea. At some point, the group decided to go to Abeer's home, after they had seen her passing their checkpoint earlier. The four soldiers of the six-man unit responsible for the checkpoint—Barker, Cortez, Green, and Spielman—then left their posts for Abeer's home. Two men, Howard and Sergeant Anthony W. Yribe, remained at the post. Howard had not been involved in discussions to rape and murder the family, but reportedly overheard the four men talking about it and saw them leave. Yribe had no involvement but was also accused of failing to report the attack.

On the day of the massacre, Abeer's father Qassim was enjoying time with his family, while his sons were at school. In broad daylight, the four U.S. soldiers walked to the house, not wearing their uniforms, but wearing army-issue long underwear—reportedly to look like "ninjas"—and separated 14-year-old Abeer and her family into two different rooms. Spielman was responsible for grabbing Abeer's 6-year-old sister, who was outside the house with her father, and bringing her inside the house. Green then broke Abeer's mother's arms (likely resulting from a struggle that began when she heard her daughter being raped in the other room) and murdered her parents and younger sister, while two other soldiers, Cortez and Barker, raped Abeer. Barker wrote that Cortez pushed Abeer to the floor, lifted her dress, and tore off her underwear while she struggled. According to Cortez, Abeer "kept squirming and trying to keep her legs closed and saying stuff in Arabic", as he and Barker took turns holding her down and raping her.

Cortez testified that Abeer heard the gunshots in the room in which her parents and little sister were being held, causing her to scream and cry even more. Green then emerged from the room saying, "I just killed them, all are dead." Green, who later said the crime was "awesome", then raped Abeer, afterwards shooting her in the head multiple times. After the massacre, Barker poured petrol on Abeer and the soldiers set fire to the lower part of the girl's body. Barker testified that the soldiers gave Spielman their bloodied clothes to burn and that he threw the AK-47 used to murder the family into a canal. They left to "celebrate" their crimes with a meal of chicken wings.

Meanwhile, the fire from Abeer's body eventually spread to the rest of the room. The smoke alerted neighbors, who were among the first to arrive on the scene. One recalled, "The poor girl, she was so beautiful. She lay there, one leg was stretched and the other bent and her dress was lifted up to her neck." They ran to tell Abu Firas Janabi, Abeer's uncle, that the farmhouse was on fire and that dead bodies could be seen inside the burning building. Janabi and his wife rushed to the farmhouse and doused some of the flames to get inside. Upon witnessing the scene inside, Janabi went to a checkpoint guarded by Iraqi Army soldiers to report the crime. Abeer's 9- and 11-year-old younger brothers, Ahmed and Mohammed, returned from school later that afternoon, first going to their uncle's home, and then to their still-burning home.

The Iraqi soldiers immediately went to examine the scene and thereafter went to an American checkpoint to report the incident. This checkpoint was different from the one manned by the perpetrators. After approximately an hour, some soldiers from the checkpoint went to the farmhouse. These soldiers were accompanied by Cortez, who vomited more than once and had to exit the crime scene.

== Cover-up ==
Iraqi soldiers arrived on scene shortly after the incident. Green and his accomplices alleged that the massacre had been perpetrated by Sunni insurgents. These Iraqi soldiers conveyed this information to Abeer's uncle, who viewed the bodies. U.S. investigators concluded that Iraqi insurgents had murdered the al-Janabi family. This incorrect report was submitted to military leadership, who chose not to investigate the matter any further. The murders were not widely reported inside Iraq, since Iraq was dealing with widespread violence. Reportedly, several American soldiers heard of or were told about the murders, but did not say anything. Anthony W. Yribe was among those who were aware; Green told him of what had happened that day, that he had killed them, and the following day gave Yribe more details. In May 2006, Green was honorably discharged after he was diagnosed with antisocial personality disorder.

== Retaliation ==
On 4 July, Jaysh al-Mujahidin claimed responsibility for downing a U.S. Army AH-64 Apache "in retaliation for the child, Abir, whom U.S. soldiers raped in Al-Mahmudiyah, south of Baghdad".

On 10 July, the Mujahideen Shura Council released a graphic video showing the bodies of PFCs Thomas L. Tucker and Kristian Menchaca half-burnt, with one of them having been beheaded. This video was accompanied by a statement saying that the group carried out the killings as "revenge for our sister who was dishonored by a soldier of the same brigade." The Washington Post reported that David Babineau and two others from the same unit were captured and killed by militants a month after the rape.

The video from the Mujahideen Shura Council claimed that upon learning of the massacre, the group "kept their anger to themselves and didn't spread the news, but were determined to avenge their sister's honor". Locals may have been able to deduce the guilt of the U.S. soldiers from the nearby checkpoint, after the U.S. and their Iraqi cohort unit provided the explanation, "Sunni extremists did this." A portion of locals served as auxiliary support for both Al-Qaeda in Iraq and the 1920 Revolution Brigades. Auxiliary support supplied material aid and performed a human intelligence support function. Relaying the accusation of the local MNC-I unit to the insurgents was a basic function of that support. The Sunni extremists were able to eliminate themselves as suspects and, having an already low opinion of the U.S. military, may have assumed the guilt of the 101st Airborne soldiers. A statement issued along with the video stated that, "God Almighty enabled them to capture two soldiers of the same brigade as this dirty crusader." Other militant groups also made various claims or statements announcing revenge campaigns after the killings were reported on 4 July, when the U.S. investigation into the incident was announced.

On 12 July, the Islamic Army in Iraq claimed responsibility for a suicide car bomb near the entrance to the Green Zone in Baghdad, in support of the "Abir operations" targeting the "evil den in the Green prison".

== Exposure and legal proceedings ==
Shortly after the 16 June attack in which Tucker and Menchaca, were captured, and Babineau killed, PFC Justin Watt who also served in the unit spoke with fellow soldier Sergeant Anthony Yribe. During their conversation, Yribe told Watt about what he had heard from Green about killing the al-Janabi family. Watt then approached Bryan Howard, who confirmed everything. Neither Yribe nor Howard were planning to talk to military leadership about the crime.

Watt felt differently, but initially feared retaliation from his fellow soldiers. After calling his father, Rick Watt – an Army veteran – Watt decided to come forward. Watt then talked to a non-commissioned officer in his platoon, Sergeant John Diem. Watt trusted Diem; he told him he knew a terrible crime had been committed and asked for his advice, fearing reprisals if he reported the crime. Diem told Watt to be cautious, but said he had a duty as an honorable soldier to report the crime to the proper authorities. The two men did not trust their chain of command to protect them if they reported a war crime. Around 20 June 2006, Watt reported the crime and informed Diem. Four days later, the battalion commander, Lieutenant Colonel Thomas Kunk, went to the checkpoints where Cortez, Barker, and Spielman were assigned. Kunk questioned them about the reported incident. All of them denied any knowledge or involvement. Kunk then went to Watt's patrol base. In interviews later on, Watt recalled the incident:

Kunk had confronted Watt while he was on sentry duty, and took him to a small, dark room in a run-down building. Several soldiers, including Yribe, watched as Kunk screamed at Watt that he should charge him with filing a false report, and accused him of trying to get out of the Army. Kunk asked Watt why he would want to ruin his fellow soldiers' careers, and told him he was just repeating false information. Watt explained why he reported the incident. However, Kunk silenced him and told him to return to his post, which Watt did.

Watt then watched Kunk load up his convoy and leave. According to interviews, this was the exact scenario that Watt had feared. He had just been publicly identified as the whistleblower, then abandoned. "I can't explain to you how I felt watching that convoy drive away", Watt recalled. "I thought I was a dead man." However, Diem, who was at another checkpoint down the road, saw the convoy leaving Watt's patrol base. Diem radioed Kunk's convoy to ask if they had taken Watt. Kunk replied that he had not. Diem said, "You have to go back and get him. If you leave him there, they'll kill him." This radio exchange was overheard by Watt, his unit, and the entire convoy, forcing Kunk to return and retrieve Watt. On arriving at the Battalion headquarters Kunk placed Watt under confinement and instructed investigators to interrogate him for filing a false report, however Watt stood firm in his allegations. The investigators then questioned Howard, who confessed to the murders immediately.

Green, Barker, Cortez, Spielman, Howard, and Yribe were all arrested within days of this incident. Since Green had already been discharged from the military, the FBI assumed jurisdiction over him under the Military Extraterritorial Jurisdiction Act and the U.S. Department of Justice charged him with the murders. Green was arrested as a civilian and was tried and convicted by the United States District Court for the Western District of Kentucky in Paducah, Kentucky.

=== Steven Dale Green ===
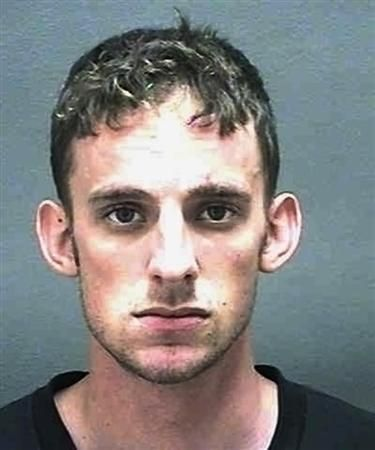
Steven Dale Green after his arrest in 2006

Green was arrested in North Carolina while traveling home from Arlington, Virginia, where he had attended the funeral of a soldier. On 30 June 2006, the FBI arrested Green, who was held without bond and transferred to Louisville, Kentucky. On 3 July federal prosecutors charged him with raping and murdering Abeer, and with murdering her parents and younger sister. On 10 July, the U.S. Army charged four other active-duty soldiers with the same crime. Yribe was charged with failing to report the attack, but not with having participated in the massacre.

On 6 July 2006, Green entered a plea of not guilty through his public defenders. U.S. Magistrate Judge James Moyer set an arraignment date of 8 August in Paducah, Kentucky.

On 11 July, his lawyers requested a gag order. "This case has received prominent and often sensational coverage in virtually all print, electronic and internet news media in the world. [...] Clearly, the publicity and public passions surrounding this case present the clear and imminent danger to the fair administration of justice", said the motion. Prosecutors had until 25 July to file their response to the request. On 31 August, a federal judge rejected the gag order. U.S. District Judge Thomas Russell said there is "no reason to believe" that Green's right to a fair trial would be in jeopardy. Furthermore, he added, "It is beyond question that the charges against Mr. Green are serious ones, and that some of the acts alleged in the complaint are considered unacceptable in our society."

Opening arguments in Green's trial were heard on 27 April 2009. The prosecution rested its case on 4 May. On 7 May 2009, Green was found guilty by the federal court in Kentucky of rape and multiple counts of murder. While prosecutors sought the death penalty in this case, jurors failed to agree unanimously and the death sentence could not be imposed. On 4 September, Green was formally sentenced to life in prison with no possibility of parole. The fact that Green was spared the death penalty provoked outrage from the family's relatives, with Abeer's uncle describing the sentence as "a crime—almost worse than the soldier's crime". Green challenged his convictions, claiming that the Military Extraterritorial Jurisdiction Act is unconstitutional and that he should face a military trial. He lost his appeal in August 2011.

Green was held in the United States Penitentiary, Tucson, Arizona, and died in 2014 from complications following a suicide attempt by hanging two days earlier.

=== James P. Barker ===
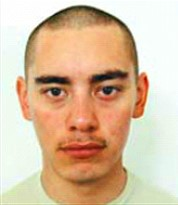
James P. Barker after his arrest in 2006

On 15 November 2006, Barker pleaded guilty to rape and murder as part of a plea agreement requiring him to give evidence against the other soldiers to avoid a possible death sentence. In a statement to the judge, Barker said "I hated Iraqis, your honor. They can smile at you, then shoot you in your face without even thinking about it."

During his sentencing hearing, numerous fellow soldiers testified in favor of the argument that Barker could eventually be rehabilitated. They described Barker going weeks with minimal support and sleeping as he manned checkpoints. Captain William Fischbach, the lead prosecutor, said this was no excuse for Barker's actions and requested a life term without parole. "This burned-out corpse that used to be a 14-year-old girl never fired bullets or lobbed mortars", Fischbach said as he held pictures of the crime scene. "Society should not have to bear the risk of the accused among them ever again." Quivering as he spoke, Barker began weeping as he said "I want the people of Iraq to know that I did not go there to do the terrible things that I did. I do not ask anyone to forgive me today." He said the violence he had encountered in Iraq left him "angry and mean" toward Iraqis.

Ultimately, Barker was sentenced to 90 years in prison with the possibility of parole after serving 20 years. He was also dishonorably discharged, demoted to the rank of private, and ordered to forfeit all of his pay and allowances. Journalists reported that "he smoked a cigarette outside as a bailiff watched over him. He grinned but said nothing as reporters passed by."

During Spielman's trial, Barker attempted to recant the part of his confession in which he implicated him as a conspirator in the murders and the rape. However, Cortez testified that Spielman was aware.

As of 2009, Barker was being held in the United States Disciplinary Barracks at Fort Leavenworth, Kansas.

=== Paul E. Cortez ===
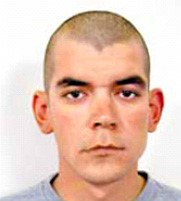
Cortez after his arrest in 2006

On 22 January 2007, Cortez pleaded guilty in a court martial to rape, conspiracy to rape, and four counts of murder as part of a plea deal to avoid a possible death sentence. During his sentencing hearing, his lawyers argued that he was under war-related stress. Cortez was sentenced to 100 years in prison with the possibility of parole after 10 years. He was also dishonorably discharged, demoted to the rank of private, and ordered to forfeit all of his pay and allowances. Cortez sobbed while he apologized for his roles in the murders. "I still don't have an answer", Cortez told the judge. "I don't know why. I wish I hadn't. The lives of four innocent people were taken. I want to apologize for all of the pain and suffering I have caused the Al Janabi family."

=== Jesse V. Spielman ===
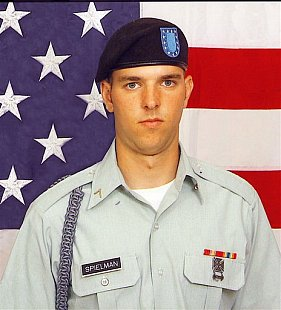
Spielman before his arrest

On 3 August 2007, Spielman, 23, was sentenced by a court martial to 110 years in prison with the possibility of parole after 10 years. He was also dishonorably discharged, demoted to the rank of private, and ordered to forfeit all of his pay and allowances. He was convicted of rape, conspiracy to commit rape, housebreaking with intent to rape, and four counts of felony murder. He initially pleaded guilty to conspiracy toward obstruction of justice, arson, wrongfully touching a corpse, and drinking.

As of 2009, Spielman was being held in the United States Disciplinary Barracks at Fort Leavenworth, Kansas.

=== Bryan L. Howard ===
Howard was sentenced by a court martial under a plea agreement for conspiracy to obstruct justice and being an accessory after the fact. The court found that his involvement included hearing the others discussing the crime and lying to protect them, but not commission of the actual rape or murders. Howard was sentenced to 27 months in prison, demoted in rank to private, and dishonorably discharged. He served 17 months.

=== Anthony W. Yribe ===
Yribe was initially charged with obstructing the investigation, specifically, dereliction of duty and making a false statement. In exchange for his testimony against the other men, the government dropped the charges against Yribe and he was given an other than honorable discharge.

== Others ==
=== Justin Watt ===
Watt, the whistleblower, received a medical discharge and as of 2009 was running a computer business. He says that he received death threats after coming forward; in 2010, he was asked by the US Army Center for the Army Profession and Ethic (CAPE) at West Point, New York, to be interviewed and speak before Army Profession audiences about his decision to report the crimes in accordance with his moral obligation to uphold the Army Ethic.

=== Survivors ===
Muhammed and Ahmed Qassim Hamza al-Janabi, the surviving brothers of murder victim Abeer Qassim Hamza al-Janabi, were being raised by an uncle, according to testimony in the courts-martial of Cortez, Barker and Spielman.

== In popular culture ==
- The 2007 war film Redacted is loosely based upon the events at Mahmudiyah.
- The incident and the ensuing investigations were described in the book Black Hearts by Jim Frederick, published in 2010.
- The play 9 Circles by Bill Cain follows Daniel Reeves, a character based on Steven D. Green, through the aftermath of Mahmudiyah and was performed in 2011 at the Bootleg Theatre in Los Angeles.
- The murders and the ensuing investigations are covered in case 78 of Casefile.

== See also ==
- 2004 Fallujah ambush
- Haditha massacre
- Hamdania incident
- John E. Hatley
- Human rights in post-invasion Iraq
- Incident on Hill 192
- Kandahar massacre
- Maywand District murders
- Sexual assault in the U.S. military
- United States war crimes
