= Atwan =

Atwan (Arabic: عطوان, ʿAṭwān) is an Arabic surname, it may refer to:

- Abdel Bari Atwan (born 1950), Palestinian journalist;
- Atwan Al Atwani (born 1973), Iraqi politician;
- Robert Atwan (born 1940), American writer.
