= Wassef Ali Hassoun =

United States Marine (born 1980)

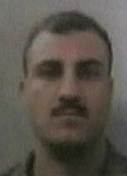
- Hassoun in 2004
- Born: January 1, 1980 (age 46); Lebanon
- Military career
- Branch: United States Marine Corps
- Service years: Active: 2002–2005; Deserted: 2004–2014; Confinement: 2014–2016
- Rank: Private (demoted from corporal)
- Conflicts: Iraq War (surrendered)

Wassef Ali Hassoun (Arabic: واصف علي حسون; born January 1, 1980) is a United States Marine who was charged with desertion for leaving his unit and engaging with others in a hoax to make it appear that he had been captured by terrorists on June 19, 2004, while serving in Iraq. Originally listed as having deserted, the Lebanese-born Marine was then thought to have been taken hostage by Iraqis who were thought to have befriended him.

== Career ==
Al Jazeera broadcast a video of Hassoun on June 27, 2004, blindfolded and with a sword held over his head, saying that he had been captured. His "kidnappers" identified themselves as part of "Islamic Response", the security wing of the "National Islamic Resistance" 1920 Revolution Brigades.

On July 3, 2004, Al Jazeera reported that the terrorist group 1920 Revolution Brigades had released a statement declaring they had beheaded Hassoun, and their website confirmed this. On July 4, it was reported that the Army of al-Sunna denied this, and on July 6, Al Jazeera reported receipt of a message he'd been "taken to a safe location" after he promised to desert from the U.S. Marine Corps.

On July 7, CNN reported that Hassoun had contacted his family in West Jordan, Utah and Lebanon from the U.S. Embassy in Beirut, asking to be picked up at an unspecified location. The Houston Chronicle stated later that afternoon his family, as well as the embassy in question, deny that the telephone call had taken place.

On July 8, U.S. Department of State spokesman Richard A. Boucher announced that Hassoun had arrived at the embassy in Beirut at 11 am EDT, and was in good health.

A preliminary result of the U.S. Navy investigation into the activities of Hassoun concluded that he deserted the U.S. Marine Corps on June 21, 2004. In mid-July, he publicly denied desertion.

On December 9, 2004, the U.S. Department of Defense announced that Hassoun would be charged with desertion, larceny and wrongful disposition of military property in connection with his service-issued M9 pistol that disappeared with him and never turned up. If convicted, he faced a dishonorable discharge, forfeiture of all pay, and from five to ten years incarceration on each specification.

In a further development, on January 4, 2005, he was again labelled a deserter after failing to return to his base in North Carolina from authorized leave. He reportedly fled to Lebanon.

On June 29, 2014, Hassoun was reported to have turned himself in to U.S. authorities on the two charges of desertion.

On February 23, 2015, Hassoun was found guilty of deserting when he disappeared in 2004 and 2005, and was convicted of causing the loss of his service pistol. He was sentenced to two years and five days in prison, with credit for approximately eight months he spent in pretrial confinement. Hassoun also had his rank reduced, lost his pay, and received a dishonorable discharge. He was discharged in 2016.

== See also ==
- Ahmed Kousay Altaie – A U.S. Army soldier who was captured by Iraqi insurgents and executed
- American POWs in the 2003 invasion of Iraq
- 2004 Iraq KBR convoy ambush – Capture and execution of Keith Matthew Maupin, a U.S. Army soldier
- June 2006 abduction of U.S. soldiers in Iraq – Capture and execution of Kristian Menchaca and Thomas L. Tucker, two U.S. Army soldiers
- Karbala provincial headquarters raid – Capture and execution of Brian Freeman, Jacob Fritz, Jonathan Chism and Shawn Falter, four U.S. Army soldiers
- List of fugitives from justice who disappeared
- May 2007 abduction of U.S. soldiers in Iraq – Capture and execution of Alex Ramon Jimenez, Joseph John Anzack and Byron Wayne Fouty, three U.S. Army soldiers
