= United States prisoners of war in the 2003 invasion of Iraq =

The 2003 invasion of Iraq, which lasted from March 20 to May 1, 2003, resulted in a small number of U.S. and Coalition prisoners of war (POWs).

== 507th Maintenance Company ==
=== March 23rd ambush and capture ===
A majority of the POWs were captured from the ambush of 507th Maintenance Company. Separated from a larger convoy, they were ambushed in the Iraqi-held town of Nasiriyah on March 23, 2003. Out of thirty-three soldiers present, eleven were killed and seven were captured in the firefight. Several weapons of some soldiers jammed in the firefight. These following soldiers were captured by the Iraqi forces:

Name	Rank	Age when captured	Hometown	Notes
Edgar Hernandez	Specialist	21	Mission, Texas	He drove a five-ton tractor-trailer through the ambush, Shoshana Johnson was sitting in the passenger seat next to him. Shot once in the bicep of his right arm.
Joseph Hudson	Specialist	23	Alamogordo, New Mexico	Shot three times, twice in the ribs and once in the upper left buttocks.
Shoshana Johnson	Specialist	30	El Paso, Texas	A naturalized American from Panama, she was shot with a single bullet that sliced through both ankles. She was the first black woman ever taken prisoner in U.S. military history.
Jessica Lynch	Private first class	19	Palestine, West Virginia	She suffered a head laceration, an injury to her spine, and fractures to her right arm, both legs, and her right foot and ankle. She was knocked unconscious after her Humvee crashed.
Patrick Miller	Private first class	23	Wichita, Kansas	He was injured by RPG fragments.
James Riley	Sergeant	31	Pennsauken, New Jersey	As the senior soldier present, it was he who ordered the surrender. He was injured by RPG fragments.

=== Iraqi TV interview ===
Soon after their capture, Jessica Lynch was taken to an Iraqi hospital due to her serious injuries. The other five POWs, bloodied and beaten, were interviewed by the Iraqi TV, and the footage shown worldwide by Al Jazeera. In the interview, Private First Class Patrick Miller was asked why he came to Iraq; his reply was "I came to fix broken stuff." He was then asked if he came to shoot Iraqis, he answered, "No, I came to shoot only if I am shot at. They don't bother me, I don't bother them." In a CNN newscast, Miller stated that he believed that he was intended to be killed after his capture.

=== March 24th Downed Helicopter and Capture ===
On March 24, they were joined by Chief Warrant Officers Officers David Williams, 31, and Ronald Young Jr., 26, whose AH-64 Apache helicopter from the 1-227 Helicopter Attack Battalion had been shot down in central Iraq during the attack on Karbala.

=== Relocation and rescue ===
The POWs were taken to Baghdad, where they were isolated in separate prison cells. As American troops came closer, the soldiers were shifted from building to building.

As it became clear that the war was over for the Iraqis, some of their captors approached a Marine unit from the 3rd Light Armored Reconnaissance Battalion, Delta Co., 3rd Platoon which was a part of Task Force Tripoli that had been pushing up toward Tikrit, Saddam Hussein's hometown. A Marine battalion was sent to check on intelligence and found the seven POWs with a confused Iraqi guard unit, whose officers had fled.

On April 13, 2003, 21 days after the 507th members were captured, members of the 3rd Light Armored Recon burst in on the Iraqi guards who gave up without a fight. Ordering everyone on the floor, a Marine gave an order to "Stand up if you're American!" Given dirty prison clothes and fed little food, the POWs had lost much weight and with their garb, and beards they looked like Iraqis. "At first," Spc. Shoshana Johnson remembers that, "They didn't realize I was American. They said, 'Get down, get down,' and one of them said, 'No, she's American.'"

Within hours, the seven were on their way to Kuwait International Airport inside a Marine Corps KC-130 transport plane, the first stop before the United States. They told their stories to two reporters accompanying them on the flight. "I broke down. I was like, 'Oh my God, I'm home,'" Johnson said.

== War crimes perpetrated against Coalition forces ==
During the 2003 invasion of Iraq, Iraqi Saddam Fedayeen irregular forces were involved in executing several Coalition POWs.

Sergeant Donald Walters was initially reported to have been killed in the March 23 ambush of the 507th Maintenance Company. However, witnesses later reported that they had seen Walters being guarded by several Fedayeen in front of a building. Forensics work later found Walters' blood in front of the building and blood spatter suggesting he died from two gunshot wounds to the back at close range. This led the Army to conclude that Walters had been executed after being captured.

Jessica Lynch was reportedly raped and sodomized by Iraqi forces, based on scars, though she has no recollection of it happening.

Also on March 23, the British Army engineering unit made a wrong turn near the town of Az Zubayr, which was still held by Iraqi forces. The unit was ambushed and Sapper Luke Allsopp and Staff Sergeant Simon Cullingworth became separated from the rest. Both were captured and executed by Iraqi forces. In 2006, a video of Allsopp lying on the ground surrounded by Iraqi irregular forces was discovered.

Marine Sergeant Fernando Padilla-Ramirez was reported missing from his supply unit after an ambush north of Nasiriyah on March 28. His body was later dragged through the streets of Ash Shatrah and hung in the town square. His body was later taken down and buried in a trash dump by insurgent forces, fearing retribution from the US military. His body was discovered by U.S. forces on April 10.

In addition, the showing of captured soldiers on television, as was done with some of the captured soldiers of the 507th Maintenance Company, was a violation of Article 13 the Third Geneva Convention, which states that POWs be protected from "public curiosity".

== See also ==
- Wassef Ali Hassoun - A U.S. Marine who claimed to be captured by Iraqi insurgents; later discovered to be a hoax
- 2004 Iraq KBR convoy ambush - Capture and execution of Keith Matthew Maupin, a U.S. Army soldier
- June 2006 abduction of U.S. soldiers in Iraq - Capture and execution of Kristian Menchaca and Thomas L. Tucker, two U.S. Army soldiers
- Ahmed Kousay Altaie - A U.S. Army soldier who was captured by Iraqi insurgents and executed
- Karbala provincial headquarters raid - Capture and execution of Brian Freeman, Jacob Fritz, Jonathan Chism and Shawn Falter, four U.S. Army soldiers
- May 2007 abduction of U.S. soldiers in Iraq - Capture and execution of Alex Ramon Jimenez, Joseph John Anzack and Byron Wayne Fouty, three U.S. Army soldiers
