= Ibrahim Jassam =

Iraqi photojournalist (born 1977)

Ibrahim Jassam Mohammed
- Born: Ibrahim Jassam Mohammed; 1977 (age 48–49)
- Status: Released from jail in Iraq
- Occupation: Freelance photojournalist

Ibrahim Jassam Mohammed (Arabic: ابراهیم جسام محمد) is an Iraqi photojournalist who was arrested in Iraq on September 2, 2008 because he was considered "a threat to the security of Iraq and coalition forces" by U.S. and Iraqi forces. He was working for multiple agencies including Reuters at the time of his arrest. His career begun in 2006 when he was 29 years old.

Jassam was arrested from his hometown Mahmoudiyah, about 20 miles (32 km) from Baghdad. RSF says he was held at Camp Cropper, an in-transit detention camp located near the Baghdad Airport. A Reuters article says he was instead held at a prison camp on the Iraq–Kuwait border. NPR says he was held at Camp Bucca, located near Basra.

An Iraqi court concluded on November 30, 2008 that there is no evidence against photojournalist Ibrahim Jassam Mohammed, and ordered him released from U.S. military custody, but the U.S. military in Iraq refused to release him.

Jassam was released from custody on 10 February 2010, after being held for 17 months. He resumed his career as a freelance photojournalist and mostly licenses images of events in Iraq to United Press International. He published photographs from the funeral of Qasem Soleimani and Abu Mahdi al-Muhandis held in Baghdad.
