= Fadhil Abbas al-Ka'bi =

Iraqi poet and writer

- Native name: فاضل عباس الكعبي
- Born: 1955 (age 69–70); Mahmoudiyah, Kingdom of Iraq
- Occupation: Poet; Writer; Journalist
- Language: Arabic
- Genre: Children's literature, young adult fiction

Fadhil Abbas al-Ka'bi (Arabic: فاضل عباس الكعبي, romanized: Fāḍil ʻAbbās al-Kaʻbī; born 1955) is an Iraqi author of children's literature and childhood studies. From 1978, he turned to journalism and was appointed in various positions, including head of the Children's Literature Association in Iraq from its founding in 1993 until 2000. He emerged in the 1990s as a literary critic, writer and researcher specializing in Arabic children's literature, theater and culture. He received many awards, certificates of appreciation and honorary doctorates from several institutions for his literary and journalistic career.

== Biography and career ==
Fadhil Abbas Ali al-Ka'bi was born in Mahmoudiyah in 1955. He has been working in journalism since 1978 and in many cultural, media and literary institutions and organizations concerned with children's issues in Iraq.

=== Official ===
Al-Ka'bi is a founding member and then head of the Children's Literature Association in Iraq from its founding in 1993 until 2000, a founding member of the Support Iraqi Children Organization since its founding in 1992, he held several positions there until 2002. He was the official of the Children's Literature Club in the Union of Iraqi Writers from 1998 to 2001. From 1990s he held several positions in several civil institutions and organizations, as a member of the jury, an expert and an advisor for children's culture.

=== Media ===
He was appointed deputy editor-in-chief of the magazine Al-Tofoula from 1996 until 2003, and editor-in-chief of Children of the Future magazine until 2011. He wrote and prepared many children's programs and series on Iraqi Radio and Television from the 1970s until the 1990s. He also wrote many educational songs and chants for children. Al-Ka'bi is a consultant and expert on scientific culture and children's culture at the Iraq Foundation for Media Scientific and Culture (IGFMSC).

== Awards ==
- Awarded honorary doctorate by Cambridge Academy for Science and Technology
- 1994: Children's Poetry Award from the Iraqi Child Welfare Commission
- 1999: Child Song Festival Award, Jordan
- 2009: First prize in children's poetry from the Iraqi Children's Culture Department, Iraqi Ministry of Culture
- 2010: First prize in children's poetry from the Iraqi Ministry of Culture
- 2010 and 2011: Best writer of children's play by a poll of the Eyon Foundation for Culture and Arts
- 2010: Abdul Hameed Shoman prize for Children's Literature in the Field of Critical Studies.

== Works ==
=== Children's literature ===
Poetry:
- Arabic: جنة عصفور, 1982
- Arabic: أجنحة الفراشات, 1993 .
- Arabic: قصائد تحلق بالطفولة, 1994 .
- Arabic: أغنية القطار, 1995.
- Arabic: هيا نتعلم ونغنّي, 1997.
- Arabic: أشيائي الجميلة, 1998.
- Arabic: أجمل ما رأيت, 1998.
- Arabic: أرجوحتي قوس قزح, 2010.
- Arabic: أعياد لأناشيد الأولاد, 2013 .
- Arabic: صباح الخير يا عسل, 2017.
- Arabic: عيد وأناشيد, 2017 .
- Arabic: ابتهالات لنور النور, 2018 .
- Arabic: كلماتي للآتي, 2018 .
- Arabic: أحلى من أحلى ما كان, 2019 .
- Arabic: ابتهالات لنور النور, 2019 .
- Arabic: سباق الأعالي, 2021 .

Fiction:

- Arabic: الشجرة التي ابتسمت, 1982 .
- Arabic: مشروع الثعلب والدجاجة, 2010.
- Arabic: حكاية الحروف, 2012 .
- Arabic: حكاية الأصوات, 2012
- Arabic: رسالة من حديقة الحيوان, 2012 .
- Arabic: حكاية القط والفا, 2012
- Arabic: أبي صيّاد الأسماك, 2014 .
- Arabic: أمّي وحكايات أخرى, 2015
- Arabic: هنا يغرِّد الجميع, 2015 .
- Arabic: أرسم .. ألعب, 2016
- Arabic: مفتاح جدتي, 2016 .
- Arabic: ماما .. بابا لِمَ لا نعيشُ في بيت واحد ؟, 2016
- Arabic: عندي ما عندك, 2017 .
- Arabic: حسّان ودنانير الإحسان, 2017 .
- Arabic: أهلاً فصولي الأربعة, 2017.
- Arabic: هديتي الأجمل, 2016 .
- Arabic: دلو الماء البارد, 2016 .
- Arabic: حمدان في ليلة الإحسان, 2016 .
- Arabic: شجرة التفاح والغيمة البيضاء, 2016 .
- Arabic: قطة فاطمة, 2016 .
- Arabic: تعالوا .. هذه مكتبة الجميع, 2016 .
- Arabic: النملة نمّولة والطائر الغريب, 2016 .
- Arabic: جمعية النظافة المدرسية, 2016 .
- Arabic: كائنات من غيوم, 2017 .
- Arabic: هناك وقت آخر للعب يا صديقي, 2017.
- Arabic: النملة والطائر الغريب, 2017 .
- Arabic: الأسد يحكم بالعدل, 2017 .
- Arabic: نحلة صغيرة في مهمة كبيرة, 2017 .
- Arabic: الراعي حمدان والتاجر حيران, 2017 .
- Arabic: أزرق .. أزرق, 2017 .
- Arabic: تفاحة زينب, 2017 .
- Arabic: عودة الكناري من البراري, 2017 .
- Arabic: من حكايات لباب في معرض الكتاب, 2017 .
- Arabic: أرسم ألعب, 2017 .
- Arabic: مواء وعواء, 2018 .
- Arabic: غناء الديك, 2018 .
- Arabic: حلوى أمي, 2018 .
- Arabic: الوسادة ميادة تصل إلى السعادة, 2018 .
- Arabic: القمر يشرب الماء, 2018 .
- Arabic: أبي أمي .. توقَّفا, 2018 .
- Arabic: وعد جدّي, 2018 .
- Arabic: أبي أمي توقفا, 2019 .
- Arabic: جدي زغير في باص المصلحة, 2019 .
- Arabic: الببغاء واللصوص, 2019 .
- Arabic: النجار ومساميره الجديدة, 2019 .
- Arabic: أنا في مدينة السعادة, 2019 .
- Arabic: هذا ما حدث بين الثعلب والدجاجة, 2019 .
- Arabic: في الطريق إلى المدرسة, 2019 .
- Arabic: فرشاة أسنان أصدقائي, 2019 .
- Arabic: بسّام بنك الكلام, 2019 .
- Arabic: نور وهي تكبر بيننا, 2019 .
- Arabic: السباق, 2019 .
- Arabic: أحلام همام, 2021.
- Arabic: مكتبة جاري, 2021.
- Arabic: يوميات أيباد, 2021 .
- Arabic: خاتم جدتي, 2022 .
- Arabic: غرفة مها, 2022 .
- Arabic: في بيتنا زهايمر, 2022 .
- Arabic: أنا في بطن ماما, 2022 .
- Arabic: جدتي في الصف الأول, 2022 .
- Arabic: خطأ .. هذا .. صح, 2022 .

Plays:

- Arabic: ما حدث للسنجاب في ليل الغاب, 2005 .
- Arabic: السنجاب واحتفال الغابة, 2011.
- Arabic: عذاب بائع الألعاب, 2011.
- Arabic: فخري والمصباح السحري, 2014 .
- Arabic: حسّان والأميرة بان, 2014
- Arabic: هذا ما حدث في الغابة السعيدة, 2018.
- Arabic: الثعلب في مزرعة الأرنب, 2018 .

=== Children's studies ===
- Arabic: المداخل التربوية ومرتكزات التجانس المعرفي في ثقافة الأطفال, 1999
- Arabic: العلم والخيال في أدب الأطفال, 2001
- Arabic: مسرح الملائكة، دراسة في الأبعاد الدلالية والتقنية لمسرح الأطفال, 2009
- Arabic: الكيان الثقافي للطفل : مقالات وشهادات وحوارات في ثقافة الأطفال, 2010
- Arabic: كيف نقرأ أدب الأطفال – دراسة ونصوص شعرية وقصصية ومسرحية, 2012.
- Arabic: تكنولوجيا الثقافة : دراسة في الأسس العلمية لثقافة الأطفال, 2011
- Arabic: الطفل بين التربية والثقافة : دراسات تربوية في ثقافة الأطفال, 2011
- Arabic: أدب الأطفال في المعايير النقدية : دراسة في الأسس والقواعد الفنية والنقدية لفن الكتابة للأطفال, 2013 .
- Arabic: دراما الطفل : دراسة مسحية ، فنية ، نقدية ، تاريخية لتجربة مسرح الأطفال في العراق – النشأة والتطور 1970 – 2010, 2014
- Arabic: الثقافة والإنسان من البدائية إلى التكنولوجيا : دراسة في البناء الثقافي للإنسان, 2015 .
- Arabic: الإبداع وأثره في ثقافة الطفل – دراسة, 2015 .
- Arabic: الطفل والهوية الثقافية – دراسة, 2015 .
- Arabic: دور الصحافة والإعلام في بناء الطفل – دراسات في قضايا الإعلام الموجَّه للأطفال, 2016 .
- Arabic: اللعب وأثره في ثقافة الطفل – دراسة علمية, 2017 .
- Arabic: الثقافة العلمية في أدب الأطفال – دراسات وأبحاث, 2017 .
- Arabic: أدب الأطفال بين الظاهر والمسكوت عنه – آراء وأفكار وشهادات في راهن أدب الطفل العربي, v
- Arabic: الطفل والمدينة : نحو إستراتيجية مستقبلية للتنمية البشرية والعمرانية – دراسة طموحة للنهوض بدور المدينة العربية في رعاية الطفولة, 2017.
- Arabic: الحقيقة الموضوعية لثقافة الأطفال : دراسات ومقالات, 2018 .
- Arabic: تساؤلات في ثقافة الأطفال : أبحاث ومقالات, 2019 .
- Arabic: فن كتابة مسرحية الأطفال؛ دراسة في الأدب المسرحي ومسرحة الأدب, 2019
- Arabic: سايكلوجية أدب الأطفال – دراسة تاريخية نفسية اجتماعية, 2020 .
- Arabic: خلاصة المقال في أدب الأطفال – دراسة علمية, 2020 .
- Arabic: ثقافة الأطفال في العصر الرقمي – دراسات وأبحاث, 2020
- Arabic: قراءات نقدية في أدب الأطفال العربي – دراسات نقدية ( الجزء الأول ), 2020 .
- Arabic: مسرح الأطفال في العراق – دراسة,2021 .
- Arabic: ثقافة الأطفال : تساؤلات وإجابات, 2021 .
- Arabic: لماذا أدب الأطفال ؟ : سؤال الماضي والحاضر في معاينة التجربة العراقية, 2021 .
