= June 2006 abduction of United States soldiers in Iraq =

- Location: Baghdad Governorate, Iraq
- Date: June 2006; 20 years ago
- Deaths: 3
- Victims: Kristian Menchaca, Thomas L. Tucker, and David J. Babineau
- Perpetrator: Mujahedeen Shura Council

In Iraq in June 2006, two soldiers of the United States Army were abducted and later killed and mutilated by members of the Mujahedeen Shura Council, during a time when military forces of the U.S. and a dozen other countries were conducting military operations in Iraq during the 2003 invasion of Iraq.

On 16 June 2006, a U.S. military checkpoint near Baghdad was attacked. One of the three U.S. soldiers manning the checkpoint was killed, and the two others, Menchaca and Tucker, were abducted. Those two were recovered three days later, according to an Iraqi spokesman "killed in a very brutal way and tortured". The Mujahedeen Shura Council—an organization of six groups, including Tanzim Qaidat al-Jihad fi Bilad al-Rafidayn ("al-Qaeda in Iraq"), and forerunner of Islamic State of Iraq and Islamic State of Iraq and the Levant (ISIL)—claimed afterwards to have "slaughtered" the two abducted soldiers in revenge for the raping of an Iraqi girl and the killing of her family by soldiers of the same unit. Later confirmed by American whistleblowers in service related therapy.

== Background ==
The United States along with the United Kingdom, Australia, and Poland had in March 2003 invaded Iraq to rid Iraq from its Ba'athist government led by Saddam Hussein, and, when that was accomplished, in May 2003 decided to stay on in Iraq to "bring order to parts of that country that remain dangerous".

A platoon within the 1st Battalion, 502nd Infantry Regiment, 2nd Brigade, 101st Airborne Division (which had recently lost 10 soldiers killed in action, and was enduring leadership changes due to an ongoing investigation into the rape and killing of an Iraqi girl and the killing of her family by several other members of the unit), was charged with guarding a mobile bridge over a canal at a traffic checkpoint south of Baghdad near Yusufiyah, in a region called the "Triangle of Death".

== Attack on a U.S. checkpoint ==
On 16 June 2006 Specialist David J. Babineau (aged 25), Private First Class Kristian Menchaca (aged 23) and Private First Class Thomas L. Tucker (aged 25) were ordered to operate an observation post (OP) guarding the mobile bridge, for 24 to 36 hours, with just one Humvee, while other members of their platoon were about 0.75 miles (1.21 km) away. The three soldiers were ambushed resulting in Babineau being killed in action, and Menchaca and Tucker being captured.

The other platoon members nearby heard small arms fire at 7:49 p.m. and arrived at the checkpoint 25 minutes later, finding Babineau dead and Menchaca and Tucker missing.

Sometime between 16 and 19 June, the bodies of Menchaca and Tucker were tied to the back of a pickup truck and dragged through the village of Yusufiyah.

== Mujahedeen Shura Council gives notice ==
8,000 Iraqi and U.S. soldiers launched a search for the two missing soldiers, during which one more U.S. soldier was killed and 12 others were injured, while coalition forces killed two insurgents and detained 78.

The Mujahedeen Shura Council—an organization of six groups, including Tanzim Qaidat al-Jihad fi Bilad al-Rafidayn ("al-Qaeda in Iraq") fighting the Multinational Force in Iraq since 2004—claimed it was holding Menchaca and Tucker captive on Monday 19 June, and said: "we shall give you more details about the incident in the next few days, God willing."

== Recovering two killed soldiers ==
During the night on Monday, 19 June, U.S. soldiers spotted the dead bodies of Menchaca and Tucker, three miles from where they had been captured, near the village of Mufaraji. Aware of roadside bombs, they waited until daylight the morning of 20 June to go and retrieve Menchaca and Tucker. Their bodies then appeared to be tied together and booby-trapped with IEDs, and IEDs were planted around the bodies and on the road leading up to them, causing the recovery of the bodies to take 12 hours.

An Iraqi general said on Tuesday, 20 June, Menchaca and Tucker had been "killed in a very brutal way and tortured" or tortured and "killed in a barbaric way". U.S. Army general William B. Caldwell IV said Menchaca and Tucker appeared not to have died from wounds received during the initial battle with the guerrillas; that they clearly had been killed violently; and that their remains would be sent to the U.S. for DNA testing to definitively identify them and to try to determine their exact cause of death.

== MSC video of dead soldiers ==
After Iraqi officials had on 20 June disclosed that the bodies of Menchaca and Tucker were found, Mujahedeen Shura Council (apparently) stated on Internet that Zarqawi's successors, or successor, had "slaughtered" the two U.S. soldiers, in accordance with "God's will"; the Arabic word "Nahr" used in the posting denotes the cutting of the throat.

On 10 July 2006, the Mujahedeen Shura Council issued a 4:39-minute video showing the mutilated corpses of Menchaca and Tucker. The video begins with a message stating that this video is presented as "revenge for our sister who was dishonored by a soldier of the same brigade". Then the video continues with an audio clip of Osama bin Laden, and then an audio track from Abu Musab al-Zarqawi is heard over the scenes displaying and prodding the two corpses, both dead: Tucker's body is shown to be beheaded, with his severed head put on display, while Menchaca's corpse lies face down on the ground as someone steps on his head. His corpse is then set on fire. Before he was killed by being beaten to death, Menchaca's captors violently tortured him, cutting out his eye and tongue, kicking him in the back, and breaking his jaw. In 2008, Menchaca's brother-in-law, also a U.S. soldier, was killed in Iraq by an IED explosion.

== U.S. conclusions ==
U.S. officials said on 11 July 2006, the released MSC video "demonstrates the barbaric and brutal nature of the terrorists and their complete disregard for human life".

Lt. Gen. James D. Thurman, Commander of Multi-National Division-Baghdad in Iraq in 2006, ordered a military investigation into the whole affair. The investigating officer, Lt. Col. T. Daugherty, concluded in his report in May 2007 that the army unit concerned was at the time hurt by the recent loss of 10 soldiers, including several leaders, killed in action, and by the subsequent shuffle of the platoon's leadership for three times and had been dogged by the ongoing investigation concerning the unit (see section Background); that it was unrealistic to expect the three soldiers to operate that observation post that day (see above) for 24 to 36 hours; and that the platoon leader and the company commander had failed to provide proper supervision to the unit or enforce military standards. Daugherty recommended letters of reprimand as penalty for those two officers, a lieutenant and a captain. General Thurman however decided to a harsher penalty: removal of those two officers from their commands. In addition, administrative actions were taken against several other officers, which have not been disclosed due to reasons of privacy protection.

The veracity of this stated motive was disputed by the mayor of Mahmudiyah, as knowledge about U.S. involvement in the rape and murder was not widely known at the time of the attack and the original declaration announcing the kidnapping had made no mention of it.

== Trial of an Iraqi suspect ==
In October 2008, an Iraqi court convicted and sentenced to death Ibrahim Karim Muhammed Salih al-Qaraghuli for the abduction, torture, and killing of Menchaca and Tucker. Expert testimony linked al-Qaraghuli's fingerprints to bloody prints found on the truck used to drag the bodies of Tucker and Menchaca through the streets of Yusufiyah. Two additional suspects were acquitted by the court for lack of evidence. The court partially relied on statements of six witnesses who all had failed to show up in court. U.S. officials stated that DNA evidence was recovered that tied a second defendant to the killings. That evidence however was not addressed by the court due to their refusal to use a U.S. DNA expert and the lack of an available Iraqi expert.

In 2017, one of the soldiers' relatives filed a lawsuit against the Syrian government in a U.S. court.

== See also ==
- May 2007 abduction of United States soldiers in Iraq
