= The Triangle of Death =

- Directed by: Folleh Shar Francis Tamba
- Written by: Folleh Shar Francis Tamba
- Produced by: Folleh Shar Francis Tamba, Juan Montelongo, Thomas Hartmann
- Starring: Mark Smith, Guillermo Rosales, Eddie Corral, Bryan Malloy, Mark Gannon, David Kasher, Jose Melendez, Ryan Nolan, Lee Connon, Chris Bay, Piotr Bodziony, Joshua Bowers, Dustin Dunn, Juan Garcia, Koncheng Her, Raphael Macias, Brett Maddix, Xavier Malfitano, Craig Summerkamp Jr.
- Narrated by: The Riflemen of Echo 3rd platoon 2nd battalion 24th Marines
- Cinematography: Folleh Shar Francis Tamba/ Juan Montelongo
- Edited by: Gene Gordon
- Music by: Thomas Pace, Thomas Hartmann
- Distributed by: Wolf Dog Films
- Release date: May 13, 2009
- Running time: 94 minutes
- Country: United States
- Language: English

The Triangle of Death, directed by Folleh Shar Francis Tamba, is a 2009 documentary about the Iraq War.

== Plot ==
The Triangle of Death a cinéma vérité documentary which follows the day-to-day combat experiences of the riflemen of Echo 3rd Platoon from 2nd battalion 24th Marines of the United States Marine Corps, while deployed in the Iraq Sunni Triangle of Death. The film also documents the first Iraqi election in 2005 after the fall of Saddam Hussein.

‘Triangle of Death’ was a name given during the 2003–2010 occupation of Iraq by U.S. and allied forces to a region south of Baghdad, which saw major combat activity and sectarian violence from late 2004 into the fall of 2007. It encompasses several large towns in the Mahmudiya District including Yusufiyah, Mahmoudiyah, Iskandariyah, and Latifiyah. The major terrain feature of the Triangle of Death is the Euphrates River, which borders the Triangle to the southwest.

== Awards ==
- 2011 - Best documentary award (Great Lakes International Film Festival)
- 2011 - Best documentary award Naperville Independent Film Festival
- 2011 - Special Jury award (Alaska International Film Award)
- 2011 - Award winner (Doc) (Love Unlimited Film Festival and art exhibition)
- 2010 - Aired on Military Channel
- 2009 - Founder's Choice Award - GI Film Festival
- 2009 - Winner 3rd Place - Macon Georgia Film Festival
- 2009 - Official Selection - GI Film Festival
- 2009 - Official Selection - Macon Georgia Film Festival
- 2009 - Official Selection - Dead Center Film Festival
- 2011 - official Selection - (Itzon Film Festival)
- 2011 - Official Selection - (Indie Spirit Film Festival)
- 2011 - Official Selection - (Myrtle Beach Film Festival)
- 2011 - Official Selection - (Other Vince Film Festival)
- 2011 - Official Selection - (Alabama International Film Festival)
- 2011 - Official Selection - (Foursite Film Festival)
- 2011 - Official Selection - (The Film Festival of Colorado)
- 2011 - Official Selection - (Interrobang Film Festival)
- 2011 - Official Selection - (Detroit Windsor International Film Festival)
- 2011 - Official Selection - (Landlocked Film Festival)
- 2011 - Official Selection - (Rome International Film Festival)
- 2011 - Official Selection - (Clearwater Music and Film Festival)
- 2011 - Official Selection - (Chargin Documentary Film Festival)
- 2011 - Official Selection - (Southern Utah International Documentary Film Festival)
- 2011 - Official Selection - (Southern Appalachian International Film Festival)
- 2011 - Official Selection - (Marbella International Film Festival)
- 2011 - Official Selection - (The Taxes International Film Festival)
- 2011 - Official Selection - (Brantford Film Festival)
- 2011 - Official Selection - (Great Lakes International Film Festival)
- 2011 - Official Selection - (The Flint Film Festival)
- 2011 - Finalist award - (Las Vegas Film festival)
- 2011 - Film Market - (Red Rock Film Festival)
- 2011 - Official Selection - River's Edge International Film Festival

== See also ==
- Triangle of Death
