= Jim Frederick =

American author and journalist

James Durkin Frederick (November 22, 1971 – July 31, 2014) was an American author and journalist who was an editor for Time magazine.

== Biography ==
James Durkin Frederick was born in Lake Forest, Illinois, and graduated from Columbia University in 1993.

In 2010, he wrote the best-selling book Black Hearts: One Platoon's Descent into Madness in Iraq's Triangle of Death, about the Mahmudiyah killings. He was married to Time senior editor Charlotte Greensit, whom he met while stationed in London. Frederick left Time in 2013, then settled in San Francisco to start a company, Hybrid Vigor Media.

On July 31, 2014, Frederick died at the age of 42 in the Alta Bates Summit Medical Center in Oakland, California, of cardiac arrest and arrhythmia.

== Works ==
- Jenkins, Charles Robert, and Jim Frederick. The Reluctant Communist: My Desertion, Court-Martial, and Forty-Year Imprisonment in North Korea. Berkeley: University of California Press, 2008. ISBN 9780520253339
- Frederick, Jim. Black Hearts: One Platoon's Plunge into Madness in the Triangle of Death and the American Struggle in Iraq. New York: Harmony Books, 2010. ISBN 9780307450753
  - His friend Ken Kurson called this book "the single best book ever written about the war in Iraq and one of the greatest war books ever." The Commandant of Cadets at the United States Military Academy made it the inaugural book in his personal leadership development book club for cadets and told Frederick that he would be considered a lifetime friend of West Point.
