= Triangle of Death (Iraq) =

Region south of Baghdad during the 2003–2011 occupation of Iraq

Coordinates: 33.01°N 44.30°E

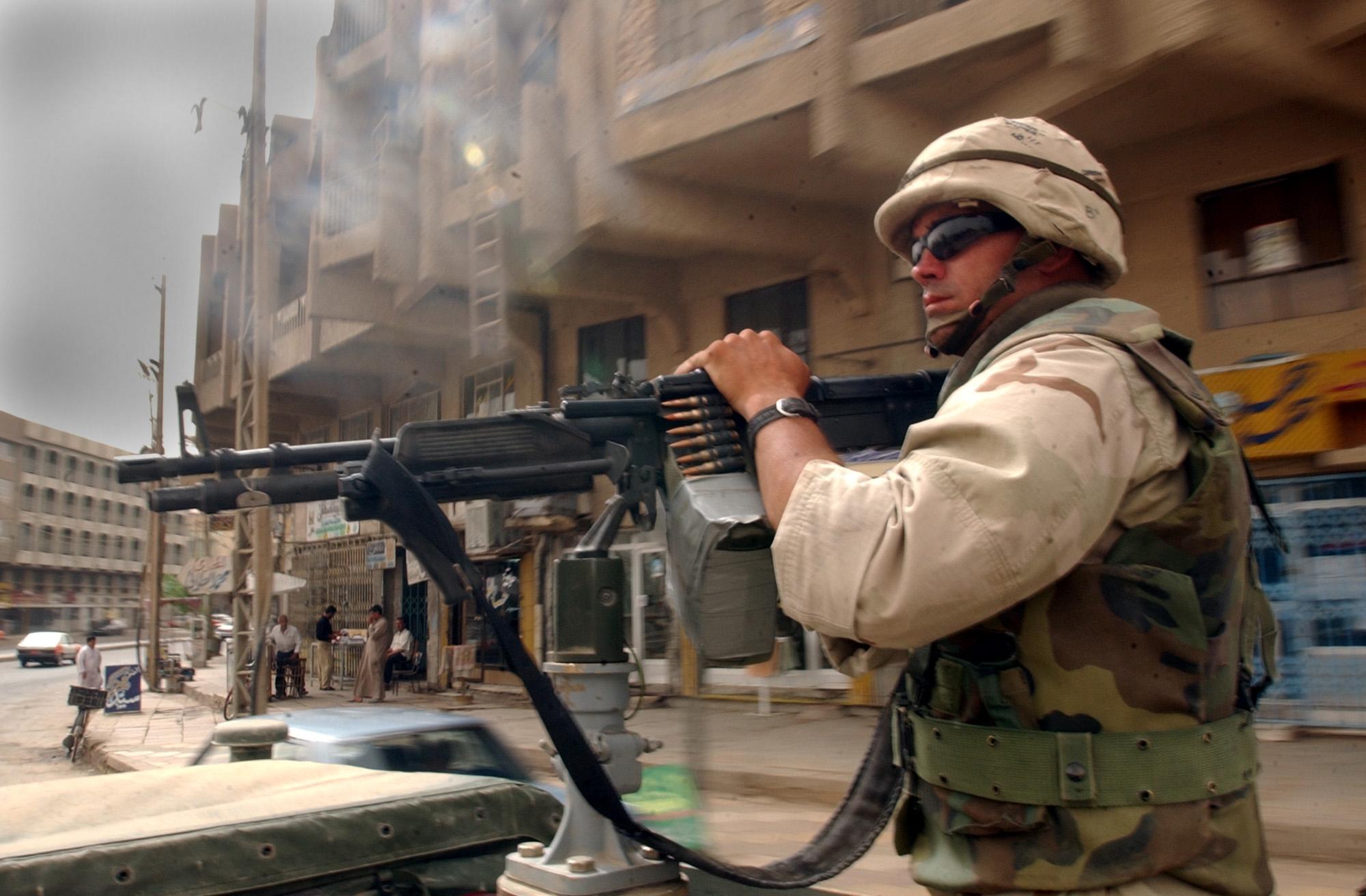
A U.S. Navy Seabee mans a vehicle-mounted machine gun while travelling through Al Hillah, Iraq in May 2003.

The Triangle of Death is a name given to a region south of Baghdad during the 2003–2011 occupation of Iraq by the U.S. and allied forces which saw major combat activity and sectarian violence from early 2003 into the fall of 2007.

== Description ==
The "Triangle of Death" (not to be confused with the much larger Sunni Triangle further north) lies between Baghdad and Al Hillah, is inhabited by one million mostly Sunni civilians, and contains several large towns in the Mahmudiya District including Yusufiyah, Mahmoudiyah, Iskandariyah, Latifiyah and Jurf Al Sakhar and hundreds of rural villages. The major terrain feature of the Triangle of Death is the Euphrates River, which borders the Triangle to the southwest. The terrain is mostly farmland, but is sliced by many irrigation ditches. These farms are usually small, being maintained by the families that own the land. The weather is generally consistent with the rest of Iraq, except for increased humidity due to the area's proximity to the Euphrates River and irrigation canals used for farming.

Musayyib is home to the Musayyib Power Plant, which was a frequent target of insurgent attacks due to its infrastructure importance. The power plant would be capable of supplying between one quarter and one third of Iraq's electricity demands if it were fully operational. In October 2006, it was at roughly 33% of its maximum potential output. Because of the indirect fire attacks on the facility, and the kidnapping of American soldiers to the area, U.S. forces occupied Patrol Base Dragon (formerly known as FOB Chosin) on the grounds of the power plant. Attacks diminished due to increased security in 2007 and with an overall increase in the security situation of Babil Governorate in 2008, the facility was closed as a U.S. base.

== Sociological causes of violence ==
Analysts generally attributed this area's high level of violence to the tension between the majority Sunni population, the Saddam Hussein-era military industrial complex in the area (such as the al-Quds General Company for Mechanical Industries, the al-Musayyib Ammunition Depot, and the Al Qa'qaa Munitions Facility), the lack of economic alternatives to joining the insurgency, and the near-endless supply of munitions that were stored throughout the area (in part due to the looting of the munitions facilities after the fall of Hussein's government).

== Post-invasion violence ==
After the fall of the Ba'athist government, the area's population suffered from unemployment. One city in the north of Babil Governorate, Al Hillah, was a frequent target of insurgent attacks. On 28 February 2005, al Hillah saw the deadliest suicide bombing in the Iraq War until that point, when 125 Iraqis were killed. At 9:30 in the morning, a suicide bomber struck a crowd of recruits for police and other government jobs waiting outside for their physicals. Casualties were also suffered at a nearby vegetable market. Other suicide attacks occurred in al Hillah on 30 May 2005 (20 killed), 30 May 2006 (12 killed), and 30 August 2006 (12 killed). On 16 July 2005, the town of Musayyib was attacked in a suicide bombing in one of the most savage attacks of the war until that point, when an insurgent detonated his explosive belt in a crowded marketplace beside a fuel truck containing cooking gas, exploding the truck and killing 98 Iraqis.

The Triangle of Death often saw catastrophic attacks like these due to the proximity to both Baghdad and Fallujah-Ramadi area, where suicide bombers usually met before heading to their intended targets. The Triangle of Death also was used as the staging area for attacks in Baghdad, specifically the 24 October 2005 attack on the Palestine Hotel. The Triangle of Death saw several deadly sectarian attacks during the 2007 Ashura processions.

Even though most insurgent attacks in the Triangle of Death were against Iraqi civilians and Iraqi government forces, U.S. forces were also the target of many attacks.

On June 16, 2006, one American soldier (SPC David J. Babineau) was killed and two other soldiers (PFC Thomas L. Tucker and PV2 Kristian Menchaca) were kidnapped near the Jurf Al Sakhar Bridge (located on the Euphrates River in southwestern Yusufiyah) after their Humvee was attacked. Their remains were found four days later, on the side of a canal road near Patrol Base Swamp in Shakaria (approximately 10 kilometers northeast from where they were ambushed). The bodies were discovered by SFC Jason Beaton, of 3rd Platoon, B Company, 2nd Battalion, 502nd Infantry Regiment (101st Airborne Division). The report from the U.S. Army Graves Registration team indicated that the bodies had been dismembered, mutilated, burned and beheaded, as well as rigged with an IED between one of the victim's legs.

On April 8, 2007, members of Bayonet Company, 2nd Battalion, 69th Armor Regiment were on static overwatch at a battle position composed of two Bradley Fighting Vehicles southwest of Yusufiah when insurgents detonated an improvised explosive device attached to one of the vehicles. The explosion destroyed one Bradley and killed PFC David Simmons and SSG Harrison Brown.

On May 12, 2007, members of Delta Company, 4th Battalion, 31st Infantry Regiment (of the U.S. Army's 10th Mountain Division) were attacked with IED, rocket-propelled grenades and small-arms fire while operating near the Qarghouli tribe region of Yusufiyah. The ambush left five soldiers dead and three missing. The body of one of these missing soldiers, PFC Joseph Anzack, was found in the Euphrates River in Musayyib by members of D Company, 1st Battalion, 501st Infantry Regiment (Airborne) and members of the local Iraq police force. The other two missing soldiers, SGT Alex Jimenez and PFC Byron Fouty, remained missing for over a year until their remains were discovered by soldiers from 3rd platoon, A Company, 3rd Battalion, 7th Infantry Regiment "Cotton Bailers By God" west of the town of Jurf al-Nasr.

== Military in the area ==
Numerous units were stationed in the Triangle of Death from 2003. Initial deployments began with occupation of small towns and roads, sometimes in individual houses and temporarily abandoned schools, but later expanded to extensive troop commitments and culminated in 2007 with multiple brigades incurring 15-month deployments commanded by Multi-National Division-Central headed by 3rd Infantry Division Headquarters. Attacks dropped dramatically from the spring through fall of 2007 following the activation of Multi-National Division-Central and an increase in operational tempo following the kidnapping of soldiers from 4th Battalion, 31st Infantry Regiment, 10th Mountain Division, near Yusifiyah in May 2007. Another contributing factor to the decline in violence was the implementation of "concerned citizen" groups in the region, conducting their own patrols of several tribal areas.

== Situation in late 2014 to 2015 ==
The towns and villages of the Triangle of Death are under the control of the Iraqi Government following many battles to regain control over the area, of which Operation Ashura was the most significant.

== See also ==
- The Triangle of Death (documentary), 2009 film
