= Mahmoudiyah, Iraq =

City in Iraq

Mahmoudiyah المحمودية
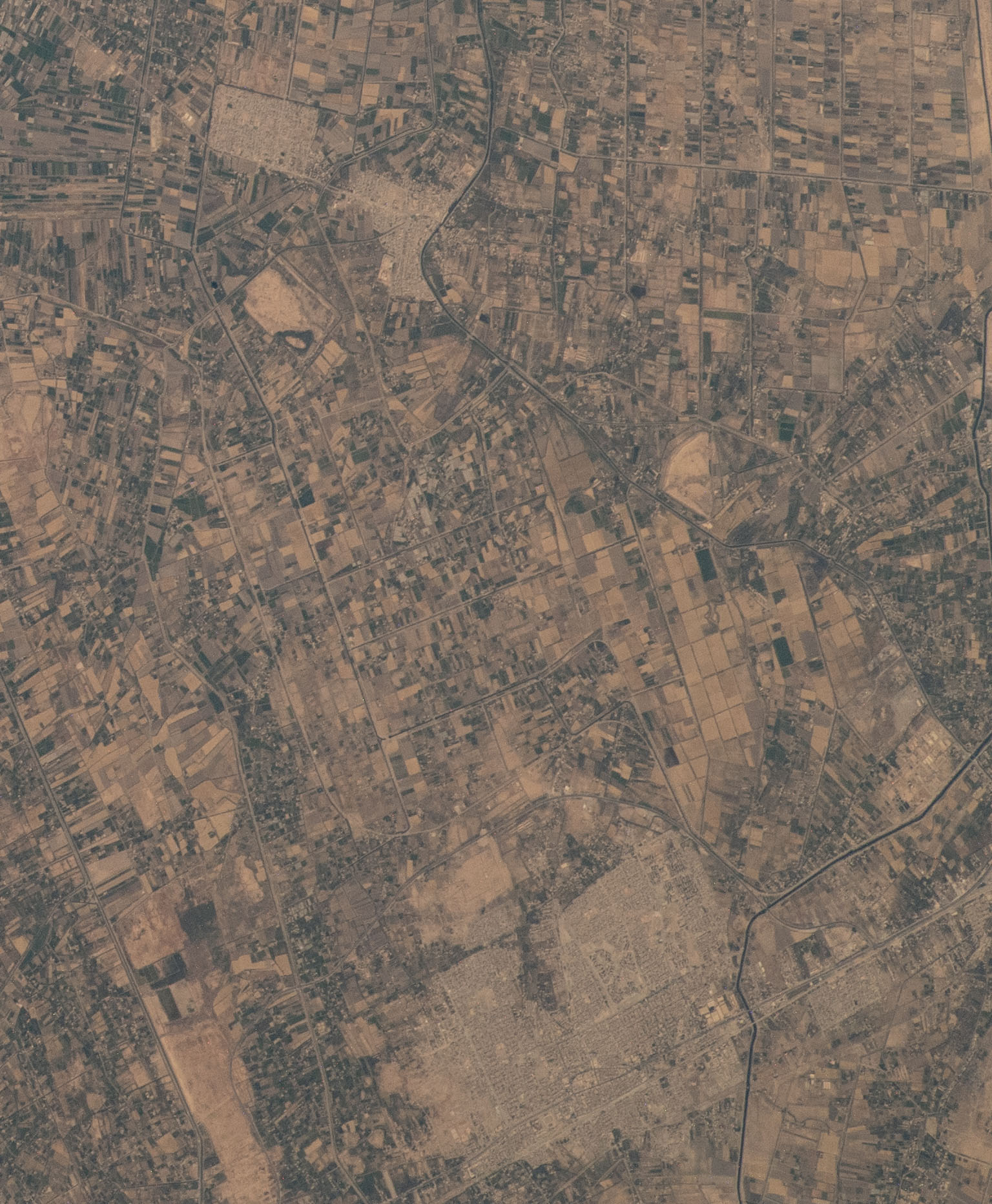
- Al Yusufiyah, Sippar-Amnanum agricultural landscape, Mahmoudiyah (grey) from above

- Location within Iraq
- Coordinates: 33°3′42″N 44°21′15″E
- Country: Iraq
- Governorate: Baghdad Governorate
- Municipality: Mahmudiya District

Area
  - Total: 196 km^{2} (76 sq mi)

Population (2018)
  - Total: 160,965
  - Density: 821/km^{2} (2,130/sq mi)

Mahmoudiyah (Arabic: المحمودية) (also transliterated Al-Mahmudiyah, Al-Mahmoudi, or Al-Mahmudiya, prefixed usually with Al-) is a rural city south of Baghdad. Known as the "Gateway to Baghdad," the city's proximity to Baghdad made it central to the counterinsurgency campaign.

Al-Mahmudiya has approximately 350,000 inhabitants, most of whom are Sunni Arabs, over 75% of Al-Mahmudiya are Sunni, as reported by the UNHCR IDPs list. While the control of rural areas around the area of Mahmudiyah is by Sunnis, such as the towns of Latifiyah and Yusufiyah, the Shiites remain in the center of Mahmoudiyah city.

== US invasion of Iraq 2003, Battle of Mahmoudiyah ==
On April 13, 2003, elements of 3rd Platoon, A Co., 3/502 Infantry, 101st Airborne Division (AASLT), accompanied by a Pathfinder Team (101st ABN), a mobile heavy weapons support team (D Co. 3/502 INF), and OH-58's from the 101st Combat Aviation Brigade moved to conduct clearance operations in Mahmoudiyah, Iraq.

3rd Platoon moved from the north to south through town clearing all government structures and securing arms and ammunition that were left by Iraqi Military and Paramilitary elements. After detonating a large ordinance cache inside a buried bunker at the City Center Office, 3rd PLT was instructed to move all ordinance outside of town for further disposal due to falling debris hazard. Support Vehicles were reallocated and the 3rd PLT continued dismounted patrols through town in search of arms caches and any lingering paramilitary forces.

3rd PLT moved on the Ba'ath Party Headquarters in the town. Upon entering the structure, a large cache of mortar and RPG ammunition was secured. The platoon began loading the ordinance in a HMMWV and secured the site. Gun Trucks from D Co., 3/502 INF, positioned themselves on the street outside the complex.

The townspeople started to congregate in the intersection outside the building. Starting with a few and then building into nearly a thousand, the intersection was packed forcing the D Co. Soldiers to be surrounded and stranded in their vehicles. 3rd PLT, A Co., did not have enough Soldiers on the ground to clear the intersection without undue escalation, so they pulled back into the walls of the Ba'ath Headquarters and continued to wait for the ordinance to be loaded.

At some point, the Iraqi flag was lowered from the flagpole of the complex. Civilians, dismayed, began throwing rocks and other items periodically. Unknown to Coalition Forces, Syrian Paramilitary forces, hired by Saddam Hussein to harass Invasion Forces, were still operating in the town. When US Forces had entered the town, the Insurgents had begun forcing residents out of their homes towards the US Forces. A Syrian Fighter threw a hand grenade over the walls into the complex and it landed amongst the 3rd PLT Leadership Huddle that momentarily met up to discuss the next objective in town. Upon detonation, multiple members of 3rd PLT were injured as more Syrian Fighters began shooting from alleys and windows into the complex.

3rd Platoon moved the wounded into the building and began treating casualties while engaging hostile forces. Soldiers moved under fire to gain superior positions and fire superiority. Paramilitary forces were eliminated or pushed back while US Forces lacked the numbers to pursue them into town without undue risk. The wounded were evacuated without deaths due the extraordinary heroism of the battalion medics. The battalion surgeon, senior medic, and other medics drove through town under intense fire in an unarmored FLA from the Battalion Tactical Command Post north of town to join the 3rd PLT medic in triaging, treating, and evacuating the wounded. 3rd Platoon eliminated all fighters preventing safe MEDEVAC and secured several landing zones as MEDEVAC aviation had difficulty finding safe sites to land.

With the seriously wounded evacuated, sporadic fighting continued as paramilitary forces harassed the coalition perimeter and area of control. 3rd Platoon continued to move on the insurgents but lacked the manpower to move without risking being spread detrimentally thin across the entire town. Fighting continued throughout the night in sporadic bouts. 3rd Platoon was reenforced by the remainder of A Co. Early in the morning of the 14th, Insurgents attempted to drive a VBIED into the Ba'ath building. The VBIED was stopped by a machine gun team before it could cause any more casualties. This signaled the end of insurgent efforts to harass US Forces.

The following morning, 14 April 2003, A Co. was directed out of Mahmoudiyah and elements of Army Civil Affairs and other units were deployed to work with community leaders to assess damages and plan for stability and support operations. This incident can be linked to the history of Coalition Operations that led to the regression of relations with the people of Mahmoudiyah.

== War crime incident ==
During the Iraq War, a war crime took place in Mahmudiyah on March 12, 2006, in which five soldiers of the 502nd Infantry Regiment raped a 14-year-old Iraqi girl, Abeer Qassim Hamza al-Janabi (an Iraqi Sunni Arab girl) and then murdered her, after killing her father Qassim Hamza Raheem, her mother Fakhriya Taha Muhasen and her six-year-old sister Hadeel Qassim Hamza al-Janabi. The soldiers then burned the bodies to conceal evidence of the crime. Four of the soldiers were convicted of rape and murder, and the fifth was convicted of lesser crimes.

== Civil infrastructure ==
Efforts have been conducted into rebuilding the city. The current mayor (as of January 2007) is Muayid Fadil Hussein Habib.

== Notable people ==
- Fadhil Abbas al-Ka'bi, (1950) writer and poet
- Ibrahim Jassam, local journalist detained by US & Iraqi coalition forces from 2008 to 2010.

== See also ==
- Triangle of Death (Iraq)
