= Mahmudiya District =

Al-Mahmudiya المحمودية
- District
- Interactive map of Al-Mahmudiya
- Country: Iraq
- Governorate: Baghdad Governorate
- Seat: Mahmoudiyah, Iraq

Population
  - Total: 550,000

Al-Mahmudiya (المحمودية) is a district in Baghdad Governorate, Iraq. Its seat is Mahmoudiyah.

Mahmudiya District has approximately 550,000 inhabitants, about over 88 percent of them Sunni and the rest Shia. This ratio is the result of the Iraqi Civil War of 2006–2007, when the Shias of Yusufiya and Iskandariya moved to Mahmudiya, and the Sunnis of Mahmudiya sought refuge in the other two cities. Most of the inhabitants live in rural areas.

Tribal inhabitants of the district are of five tribes: Al Janabi, Dulaim, Al Ubaid, Qarghoul and Al Jubour

== Cities ==
- Al Latifiya

== See also ==
- Yusufiyah
