= Yusufiyah =

Al-Yusufiyah اليوسفية
- Location within Iraq
- Coordinates: 33°4′30″N 44°14′42″E
- Country: Iraq
- Governorate: Baghdad
- Municipality: Mahmudiya District

Population (2018)
  - Total: 137,046

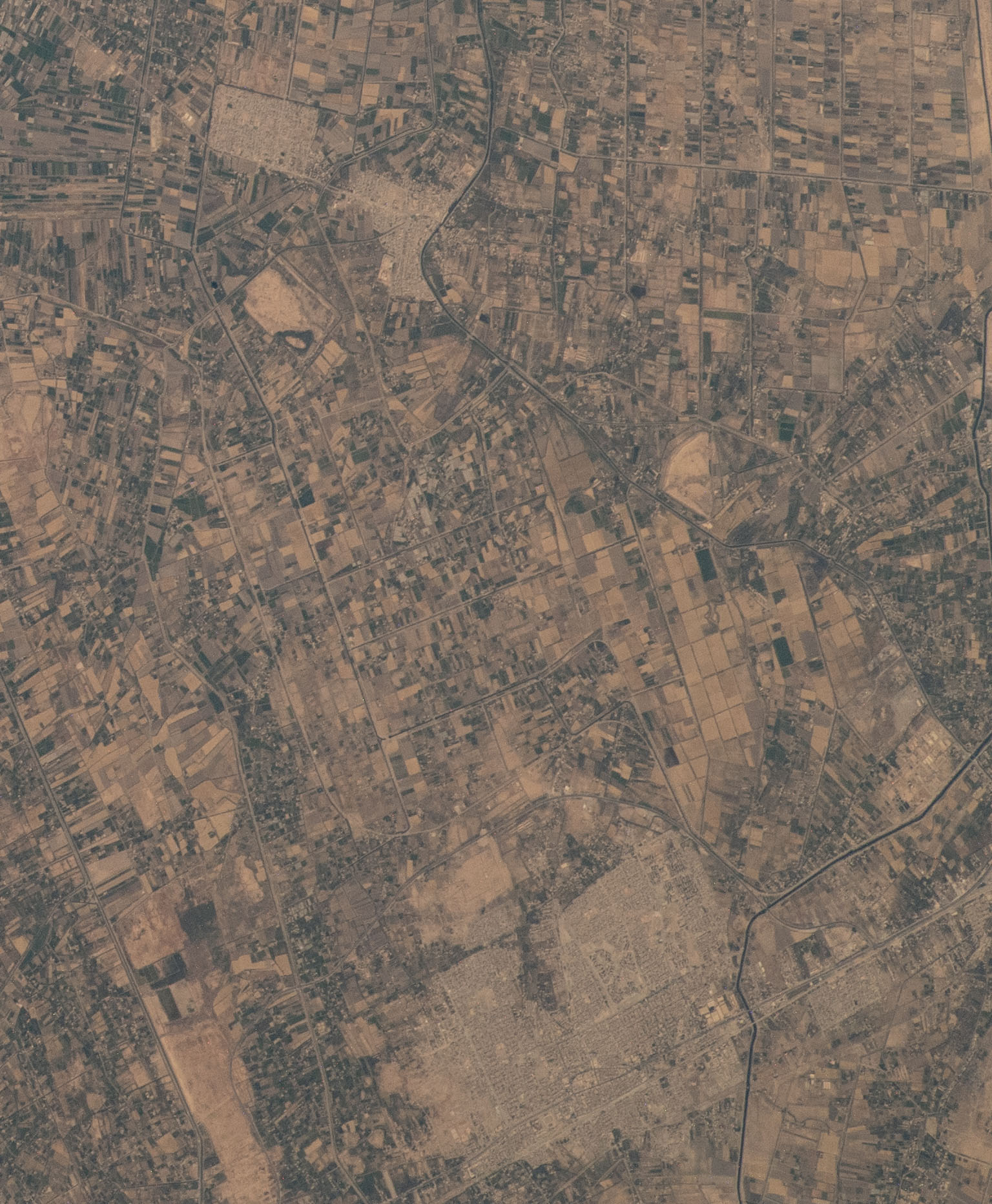
Al Yusufiyah, Mulla Fayyaz, Sippar-Amnanum and Al Mahmoudiyah

Yusufiyah (Arabic: اليوسفية, romanized: al-Yūsufīyah; also transliterated as Yusafiyah, Youssifiyah or Yusifiyah, occasionally prefixed with Al-) is a regional township in the Baghdad Governorate of Iraq.

== Background ==
Yusufiyah is named after Yūsuf (Joseph). It is about 20 miles (32 km) south of Baghdad and approximately 21 km (13 mi) east of Fallujah. It is 10 km (6.2 mi) west of the large city of Mahmudiyah, and 15 km (9.3 mi) northwest of the town of Latifiyah. Yusufiyah is similar in name to the area known as Sadr al Yusufiyah, which is a larger, more urban area near a Russian thermal power plant, approximately 25 km (16 mi) west-northwest of the town of Yusufiyah. A major canal, known as the Yusufiyah canal, runs from Sadr al Yusufiyah in the west, through Yusufiyah, and south to Latifiyah.

Yusufiyah has a population of 130,176, most living in the city centre.

The Yusufiyah area is primarily located on the east side of Euphrates river, of which the Yusufiyah canal is a branch. This area has two archaeological locations called Aldear and Abu Haba. These locations formed part of the defensive borders of Akkad (2000 B.C.) and the ancient name of Yusufiyah is Sippar.

== Architecture ==
The town of Yusufiyah has around one hundred buildings, with less than ten buildings that are over five stories tall. There are at least three mosques within Yusufiyah itself, and at least one in each nearby village. The vast majority of buildings in Yusufiyah are one or two-story brick and cement structures with shops on the first floor and apartments on the second or third floors.

== Demographics ==
The populace in the villages of Yusufiyah are mostly Sunni (about 58%), while about 99.9% of those living in the city centre are of one of the three major Shia tribes. The smaller villages nearby include Mulla Fayad (approximately 2 km (1 mi) southwest of Yusufiyah) and Rushdi Mullah (approximately 8 km (5 mi) west of Yusufiyah). Agriculture is the main form of employment, with some retail and industrial shops within the town itself. Those Sunni and Shia tribes have rooted family connections.

== Iraq War ==
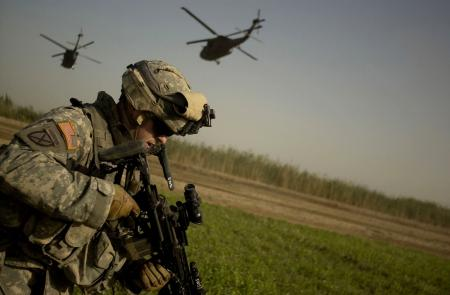
A soldier on a foot patrol in Yusufiyah, in support of locating three kidnapped U.S. soldiers (2007)

The city was part of a group of cities of Mahmudiya District including Yusufiyah, Mahmoudiyah, Iskandariyah and Latifiyah that was later referred to as Triangle of Death.

== See also ==
- Triangle of Death (Iraq)
