= Sunni Triangle =

Region of Iraq mostly populated by Sunni Arabs

Sunni Triangle المثلث السني
- Region
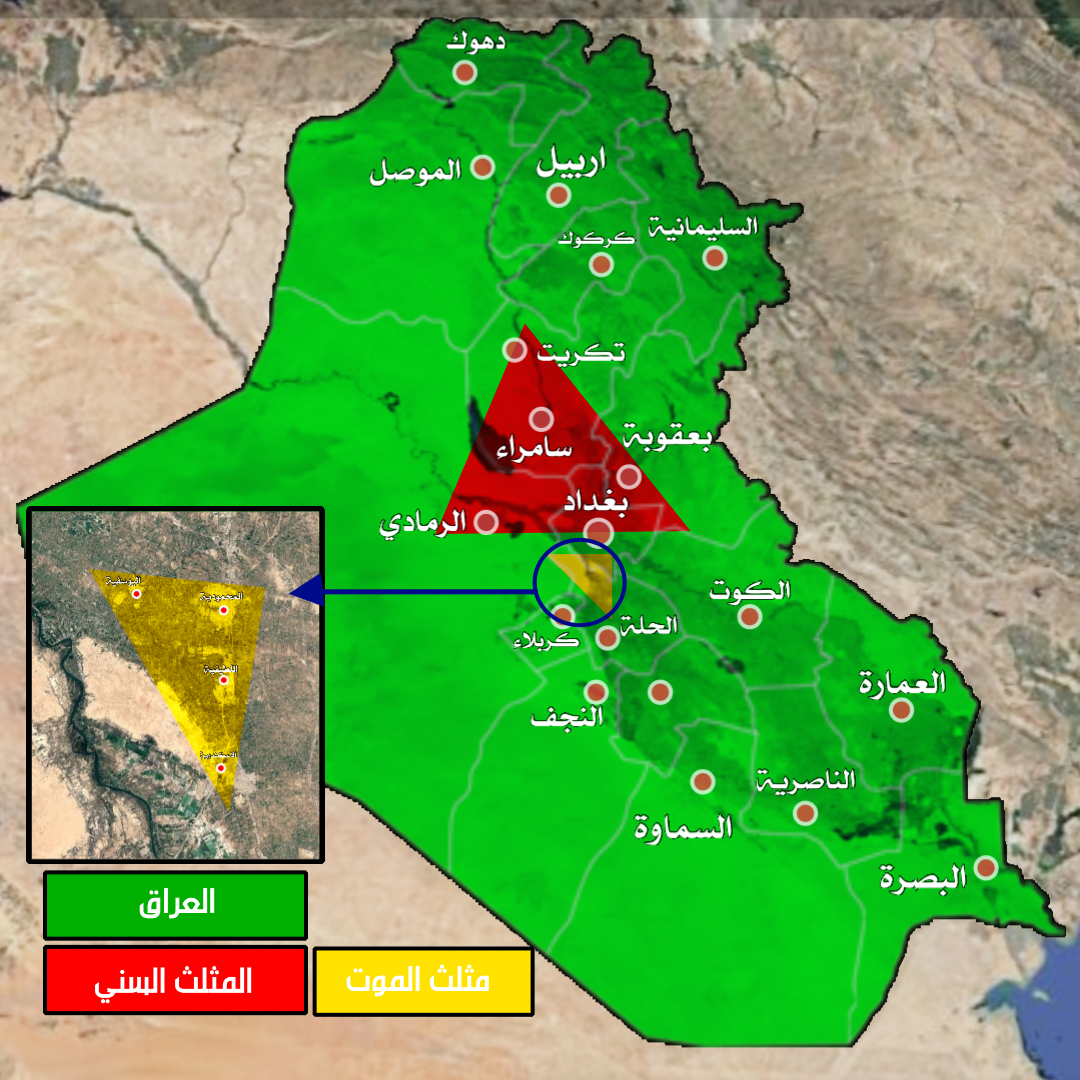
- Map of the Sunni Triangle (in red); In yellow: the Triangle of Death

- Flag

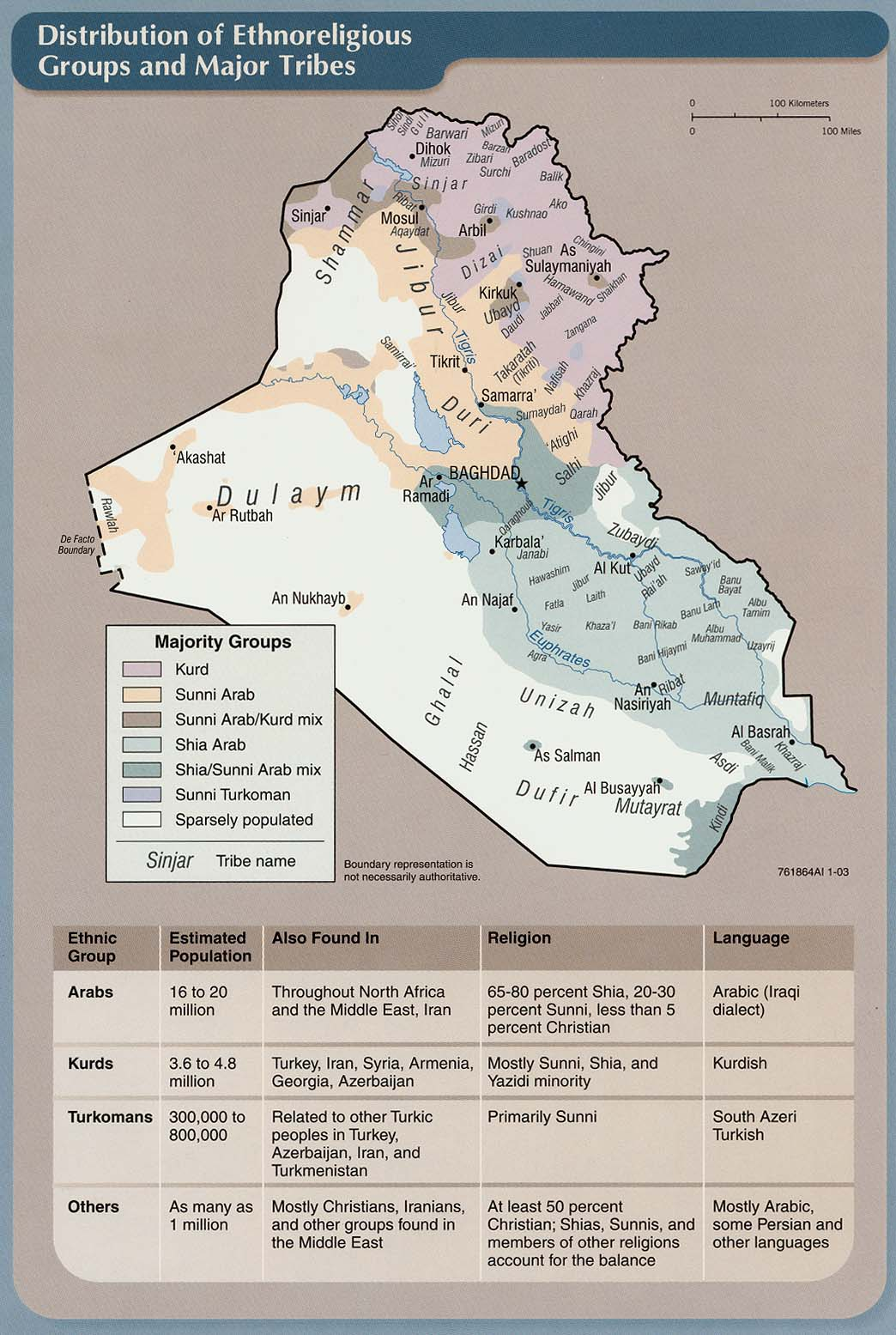
- A 2003 CIA Factbook map showing Sunni-majority areas in light orange
- Interactive map of Sunni Triangle
- Location in Iraq
- Coordinates: 33.75°N 43.50°E
- Country: Iraq

Dimensions
  - Length: 80 mi (130 km)
  - Width: 80 mi (130 km)

Population (2003)
  - Total: 500,000
- Time zone: UTC+3 (Arabian Standard Time)

The Sunni Triangle is a densely populated region of Iraq to the north and west of Baghdad inhabited mostly by Sunni Muslim Arabs. The roughly triangular area's points are usually said to lie near Baghdad (the southeast point), Ramadi (the southwest point) and Tikrit (the north point). Each side is approximately 125 kilometers (80 miles) long. The area also contains the cities of Samarra, Fallujah, Balad, Hīt, Al-Taji and Al-Karmah.

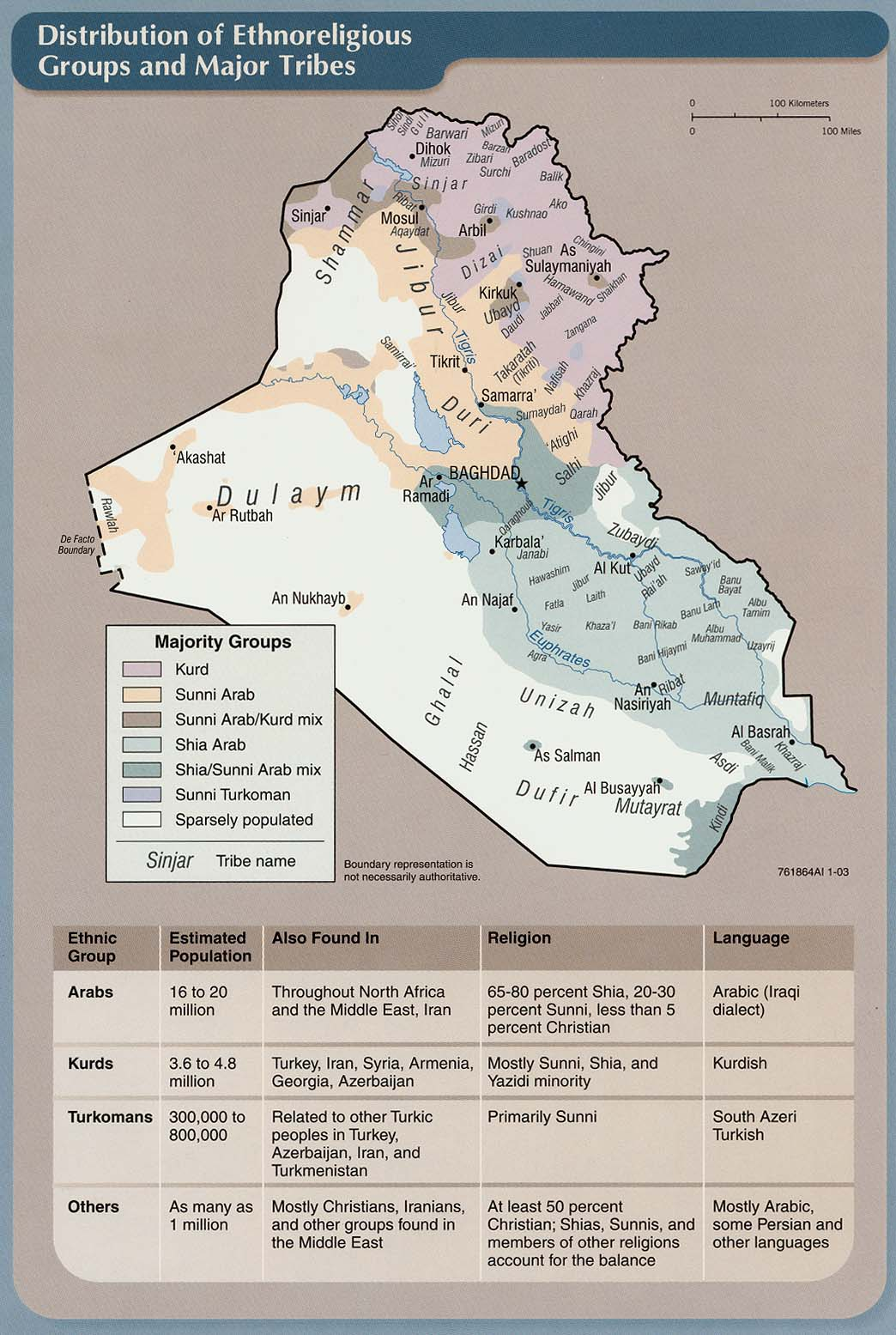
A 2003 CIA Factbook map which shows the area mostly inhabited by Sunni Muslim Arabs in light orange.

== History ==
The area was a center of strong support for Ba'athist Iraq; from the 1970s on, many government workers, politicians, and military leaders came from the area. The president Saddam Hussein was born in Al-Awja, a village outside Tikrit. After the 2003 U.S. invasion of Iraq, the area became a focus of armed Sunni opposition to Coalition Provisional Authority rule. On December 13, 2003, Saddam Hussein was captured in a raid on the village of Ad-Dawr about 15 kilometres (9.3 mi) south of Tikrit.

The term "Sunni triangle" was used intermittently from the 1970s among academic Iraq specialists, usually to differentiate it from Iraqi Kurdistan in the north and the Shia regions to the south. An early use in mainstream media is a San Francisco Chronicle article of September 14, 2002, in which former United Nations weapons inspector Scott Ritter says: "We may be able to generate support for an invasion among some of the Shiites and some of the Kurds, but to get to Baghdad you must penetrate the Sunni Triangle." However, it didn't come into widespread use until a New York Times article of June 10, 2003, popularized the term in a report on "a new U.S. effort to quell nascent armed resistance in Sunni Muslim-dominated areas north and west of Baghdad [in an] area known as the 'Sunni triangle'." It became commonplace in reports on the US-led Multi-National Force – Iraq's efforts to control the region.

The lack of economic diversity within the region is a deterrent to Sunni separatism in Iraq as most of the oil reserves are in Kurdish and Shia regions, and the port cities of Basra and Umm Qasr are far away from the triangle.

The "Sunni Triangle" is distinct from the Triangle of Death, a similarly Sunni area south of Baghdad which saw major combat activity in late 2004.

== See also ==
- Operation Red Dawn
- Operation Vigilant Resolve
- Operation Phantom Fury
