= Atwan Al Atwani =

Iraqi politician

Governor of Baghdad Governorate
- Incumbent
- Assumed office 27 July 2025
- Preceded by: Abdul Muttalib al-Ilwi

Personal details
- Born: Baghdad, Iraq
- Occupation: Politician

Atwan al-Atwani (Arabic: عطوان العطواني, romanized: ʿAṭwān al-Aṭwānī) is an Iraqi politician who is currently serving as the governor of Baghdad Governorate since 27 July 2025.

== Biography ==
Al Atwani was born in Baghdad in 1973 and holds an engineering degree. He was elected in 2017 as Governor of Baghdad Governorate.
