= Latifiya =

Latifiya اللطيفية
- Location within Iraq
- Coordinates: 32°58′55″N 44°21′33″E
- Country: Iraq
- Governorate: Baghdad Governorate
- Municipality: Mahmudiya District

Population (2018)
  - Total: 102,226

Latifiya (Arabic: اللطيفية), named after Latifiya river, is an Iraqi town south of Baghdad, between Mahmoudiyah and Iskandariya, inhabited originally by 97,043 people. It has a mix of Sunni and Shia Muslim population, and surrounded by in the west and the east by rural areas dominated by Sunni Arabs, while its countryside and towns to the north and south are Shia in their majority.

During the period between 2003 and 2007, Latifiya was one of the most dangerous places for the Coalition Forces. The insurgent groups operated almost freely in Latifiya and the neighboring Sunni dominated Al-Yusufiyah. One known case was the ambush to agents of the Centro Nacional de Inteligencia from Spain in November 2003. Nearly all of the Shia citizens were ethnically cleansed, being chased off to Mahmoudiyah, Nasiriya and Iskandariya nearby. In 2014–15, the ISIS jihadists once again expelled the Shia population. With their defeat in 2017, once again the Shia returned, but this time it was the turn for the Sunni population to be harassed and deported.

It is home to the 1/4/6 Iraqi Army Battalion and US Patrol Base Latifiya (FOB ROW).

agricultureal importance and tribes

Al-Latifiyah is known as the food basket of Baghdad and the southern gateway to the city. Its residents belong to tribes such as Al-Janabiyin, Al-Ghurair, Al-Bu Aitha, Al-Jubur, Al-Khawalid, Al-Dulaim, and other honorable tribes. The area is famous for producing strategic crops such as wheat and barley, in addition to date palms, fruits, and vegetables—especially lettuce, which is produced there in large quantities. Agriculture in the district depends on the waters of the Latifiyah River, and it has also seen development in modern irrigation systems, as well as poultry and fish farming. Al-Latifiyah became known for its resistance to the American occupation since 2003 and for confronting it, which made it a target of many retaliatory campaigns. After the situation in the country gradually stabilized and the occupation ended, life in the district returned to normal.
