= Baghdad Governorate =

Governorate of Iraq

Baghdad Governorate محافظة بغداد Baghdad Province
- Governorate
- Flag
- Nickname: City of Peace (Madinat Al Salam)
- Baghdad Governorate
- Coordinates: 33°20′N 44°26′E
- Country: Iraq
- Capital: Baghdad

Government
  - Governor: Atwan Al Atwani
  - Mayor of Baghdad: Ammar Moussa Kadhim

Area
  - Governorate: 5,200 km^{2} (2,000 sq mi)
  - Rank: 16th of 19th

Population (Census 2024)
  - Governorate: 9,780,429
  - Rank: 1st of 19th
  - Density: 1,900/km^{2} (4,900/sq mi)
  - Urban: 4,281,600 (43.8%)
  - Rural: 5,498,829 (56.2%)
  - Male: 4,904,977 (50.2%)
  - Female: 4,875,452 (49.8%)
- Demonym: Baghdadi
- Time zone: UTC+3 (AST)
- Postal codes: 10025–10043
- ISO 3166 code: IQ-BG
- HDI (2021): 0.700 high · 12th of 18
- Website: www.baghdad.gov.iq

Baghdad Governorate (Arabic: محافظة بغداد Muḥāfaẓat Baġdād), also known as the Baghdad Province, is the capital governorate of Iraq. It includes the capital Baghdad as well as the surrounding metropolitan area. The governorate is one of two small provinces of all 18 in Iraq into which the country divides entirely, yet by a margin of almost three-to-one, the most populous.

== Description ==
Baghdad Governorate is one of the most developed parts of Iraq, with better infrastructure than much of Iraq, though heavily damaged from the US-led invasion in 2003 and continuing violence during the Iraq War. It used to have one of the highest rates for terrorism in the world, with suicide bombers, terrorist attacks have been rare since the territorial defeat of the Islamic State in Iraq in late 2017.

Baghdad has at least 12 bridges spanning the Tigris river - joining the east and west of the city. The governorate's northeast includes multiple Mesopotamian Marshes.

The Sadr City district is the most densely populated area in Iraq.

== Province administration ==
Baghdad is governed by the Baghdad Provincial Council. Representatives to the Baghdad Provincial Council were elected by their peers from the lower councils of the administrative districts in Baghdad in numbers proportional to the population of the various districts that were represented.

== Government ==
- Governor: Atwan Al Atwani
- Provincial Council Chairman (PCC): Riyadh Al Adhadh

== Districts ==
- Adhamiyah
- Karkh
- Karrada
- Kadhimiya
- Mansour
- Sadr City
- Al-Rashid
- Al-Rusafa
- New Baghdad
- Al-Ghazaliya

== Demographics ==
Historical population
Year	Pop.	±% p.a.
1977	3,189,700	—
1987	3,841,268	+1.88%
1997	5,423,964	+3.51%
2009	6,702,538	+1.78%
2018	8,126,755	+2.16%
2024	9,780,429	+3.14%
Source: Citypopulation
