= 2003–2006 phase of the Iraqi insurgency =

Part of the Iraq War

- Part of Iraqi insurgency and the Iraq War
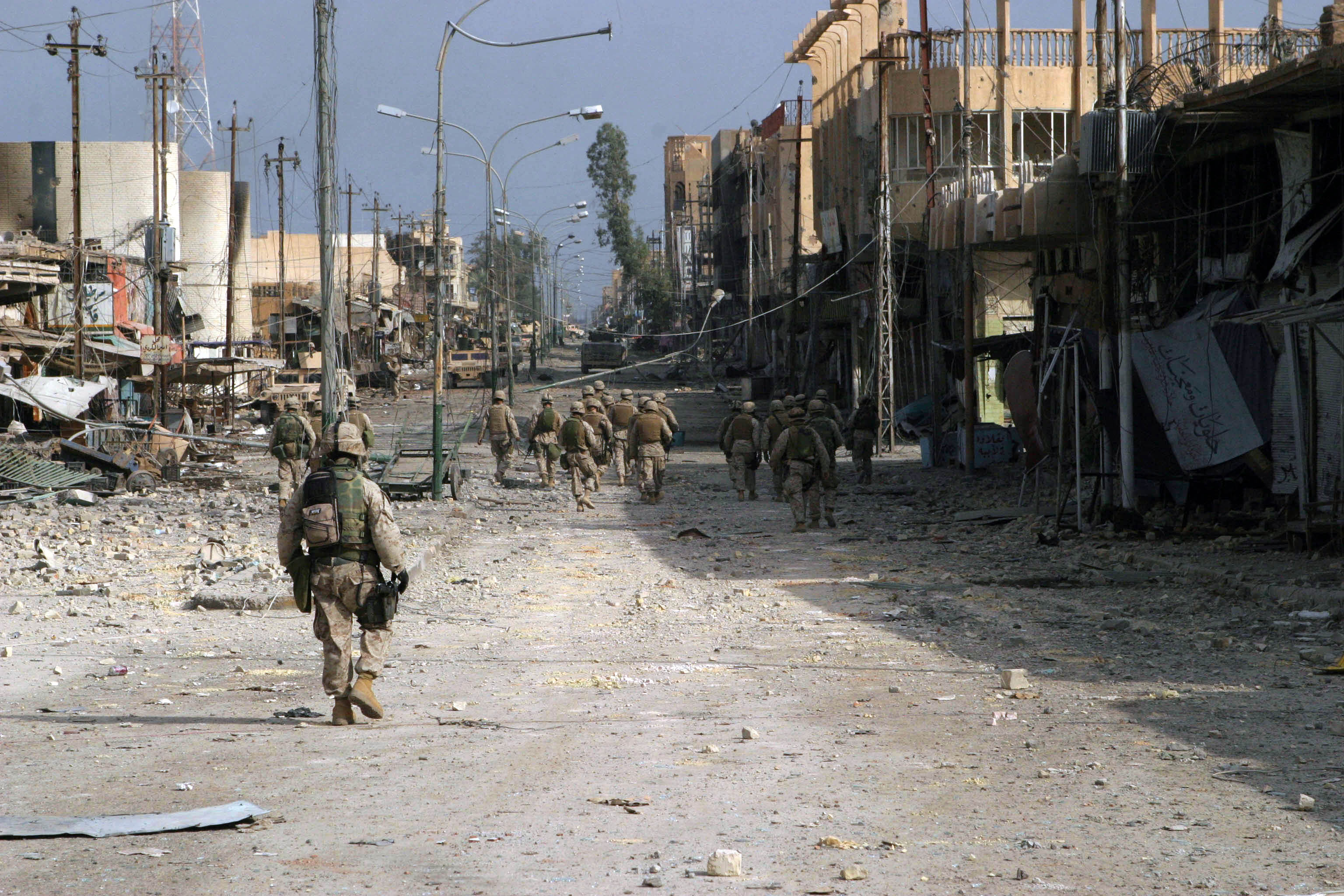
- A city street in Fallujah heavily damaged caused by the 2nd Battle of Fallujah.
| Date | 16 April 2003 – 22 February 2006 |
| Location | Iraq |
| Result | Short-term Insurgent victory: Insurgency deteriorates into a full scale civil war |

Belligerents
| Iraq; United States; United Kingdom; Other coalition forces Private Security Contractors | Sunni Insurgents: Al-Qaeda in Iraq; Islamic Army in Iraq; Jamaat Ansar al-Sunna; (Ba'athist Iraq) Naqshbandi Army; Shia insurgents: Mahdi Army; Special Groups; Kata'ib Hezbollah; Asa'ib Ahl al-Haq |

After the 2003 invasion of Iraq was completed and the regime of Saddam Hussein was toppled in May 2003, an Iraqi insurgency began that would last until the United States left in 2011. The 2003–2006 phase of the Iraqi insurgency lasted until early 2006, when it escalated from an insurgency to a Sunni-Shia civil war, which became the most violent phase of the Iraq War.

== Background ==
=== Build up to insurgency ===
A number of factors played into the beginning of the insurgency in Iraq. Invading U.S.-led forces were unable to immediately fill the power vacuum caused by the sudden collapse of a highly centralized state authority, resulting in weeks of virtual anarchy. Due to the fact that Saddam Hussein terrorized his military and time constraints in the planning of the invasion on the United States' side a power vacuum was created once the invasion started. This was due to the fact that Iraqi soldiers abandoned areas before U.S. forces could reach them and the fact that the United States failed to draw up plans on what to do once Saddam had been removed from power. The inability of American-led forces to control the situation, led to Iraqi resentment. Additionally, the unexpectedly quick implosion of Saddam's regime meant that the invading forces never engaged and decisively defeated his military in any major battle; the Iraqi armed forces simply dispersed, often with their weapons, back to their homes. At least part of the reason for this was that the Iraqi military and the security services were disbanded, after the invasion by U.S.-led forces, a decision taken by the U.S. ambassador Paul Bremer. Another cause of resentment was the lack of immediate humanitarian aid and reconstruction efforts for Iraqis suffering from the invasion, the long-term effects of the repression and mismanagement of the Saddam regime, and international sanctions. A number of factions felt suspicious of long-term American intentions; the conduct of some American soldiers also served to heighten tensions. The de-Ba’athification Commission set up by the Coalition Provisional Authority, the nature of selection of the Governing Council, and other policy decisions were interpreted by Sunni Arabs as actions intended to single out their community for discrimination; this encouraged the beginnings of sectarian tensions. However, before the invasion sectarian tensions already existed in Iraq, due to the inherent inequalities between those communities during Saddam's regime.

Members of insurgent groups came from a variety of sources. Former members of the security services of the Ba’ath regime, former military officers, and some other Ba’ath Party members are cited as members of insurgent groups; indeed, these elements formed the primary backbone of the nascent insurgency. Initially, most former members of the Ba'ath Party and former Iraqi soldiers expressed a willingness to compromise with the Coalition forces. However, many lost their jobs and pensions with the disbanding of the Iraqi army by Bremer; this, and the unwillingness of the Coalition Provisional Authority to negotiate with former Ba'ath elements, provided impetus for the initial insurgency. While 80% the officers were Sunni, the rank and file of the regular army was 80% Shia. Prisoners released from prison by Saddam before his disappearance provided another source both of insurgent recruits and of organized crime factions. Finally, as O’Hanlan says, the porous borders of Iraq and the subsequent foreign insurgents also bolstered the insurgency.

== History ==
=== Insurgency begins (April–June 2003) ===
In April 2003, after the Iraqi conventional forces had been defeated and disbanded, the U.S. military noticed a gradually increasing flurry of attacks on U.S. troops in various regions of the so-called "Sunni Triangle", especially in Baghdad and in the regions around Fallujah and Tikrit. These consisted of small groups of suspected guerrillas firing assault rifles and rocket-propelled grenades, in addition to using basic forms of IEDs (Improvised Explosive Device) on U.S. patrols and convoys in attacks that were often poorly planned and demonstrated poor marksmanship and training. In many cases, the insurgents were killed in the return fire. The U.S. military blamed the attacks on remnants of the Ba'ath Party and the Fedayeen Saddam militia. It seems that many of these attacks were "potshots" from disaffected former members of the Iraqi military. Tensions between U.S. forces and the residents of Fallujah were especially severe, with crowd riots and small skirmishes commonplace.

=== Coalition response and counterinsurgency (June–September 2003) ===
In response to the attacks taking place, on June 9, the U.S. military launched Operation Peninsula Strike, in which 2,000 soldiers from Task Force Iron Horse swept through the Tigris River peninsula of Thuluiya in the Sunni Triangle, detaining 397 Iraqis. Almost all of the detainees were later released, and the operation failed to stem the tide of the assaults. A series of similar operations were launched throughout the summer in the Sunni Triangle, such as Operation Sidewinder, Operation Soda Mountain, and Operation Ivy Serpent. One, known as Operation Desert Scorpion, succeeded in destroying an encampment of over 70 local fighters, possibly linked to the Fedayeen Saddam, near the Syrian border town of Rawa.

However, these initial counterinsurgency efforts failed to suppress the insurgency. The sweeps failed to stem the tide of the attacks, which during the summer of 2003, numbered about a dozen a day and resulted in, on average, one U.S. soldier killed and seven more wounded every day. The guerrillas began adopting new and more complex tactics, such as the planting of IEDs (concealed bombs usually placed on the roadside), the use of mortars, and better-planned ambushes. Although some humanitarian operations were included in what was intended to be a "carrot and stick" strategy, the cordon and search operations are widely criticized for being far too blunt and not carefully targeted. The large numbers of innocent Iraqis detained during the raids, the removal of palm trees and other foliage to deprive guerrillas of cover for ambushes (and which represented the livelihoods of many farmers) and the failure to restore basic services such as water and electricity to pre-war levels began increasing the nationalist resistance among the Sunnis and began resulting in the disillusionment of an Iraqi populace. In addition, as the summer neared its end, a series of suicide bombings began that suggested an increasing Islamist terrorist threats. The Canal Hotel bombing targeting the UN on August 19, and the massive blast at the Imam Ali Shrine that assassinated Ayatollah Mohammed Baqir al-Hakim along with dozens of others. Only ten days later marked the beginning of another phase to the conflict.

An effort began in August by the coalition to increase human intelligence gathering in order to more carefully target operations. The effort did eventually begin to reap limited and temporary results in the north-central region of the country (which includes Tikrit and up to the southern borders of Mosul and Kirkuk), as informants guided troops over the next six months to hideouts and weapons caches primarily belonging to the Fedayeen Saddam and the remaining Ba'athist resistance. However, most of the Sunni regions saw the military situation gradually worsen for the U.S. as a disaffected nationalist resistance began to take hold.

=== Ramadan Offensive (October–November 2003) ===
In October 2003, the intensity and pace of insurgent attacks began to increase. Finally, at the end of October, a series of four simultaneous suicide car bomb attacks on the Iraqi police and the International Red Cross, quickly followed by a sharp surge in guerrilla attacks, ushered in an insurgent effort that was termed the "Ramadan Offensive," as it coincided with the beginning of the Muslim holy month of Ramadan. Attacks that were increased to nearly 50 a day, along with a series of helicopter downings, resulted in a U.S. death toll of 82 for the month of November with 337 wounded in action.

=== Operation Iron Hammer (November–December 2003) ===
In response, the coalition launched its counteroffensive known as Operation Iron Hammer in the second week of November. Operation Iron Hammer brought back the use of U.S. air power for the first time since the end of the initial war to topple Saddam's regime, with suspected ambush sites and mortar launching positions struck from the air and with artillery fire. Surveillance of major routes, patrols, and raids on suspected insurgents were stepped up. In addition, two villages, including Saddam's birthplace of al-Auja and the small town of Abu Hishma were wrapped in barbed wire and carefully monitored. Following Operation Iron Hammer, the number of insurgent attacks dropped to an average of 18 a day. In the wave of intelligence information fueling the raids on Ba’ath Party members connected to insurgency, Saddam himself was captured on a farm near Tikrit on December 12, 2003. This apparent renewed success led many to a renewed sense of optimism that the U.S. was prevailing in the fight against the insurgency.

=== January–March 2004 ===
The period from December 2003 to March 2004 marked a relative lull in guerrilla attacks. It is believed that although some damage was done to the insurgency, this was primarily due to a reorganization period during which new U.S. tactics were studied and a renewed offensive planned. Although the guerrilla attacks were less intense, the "terrorist" offensive, possibly connected to the followers of Abu Musab al-Zarqawi, only increased. Hundreds of Iraqi civilians and police (mainly Shi'a) were killed over this period in a series of massive bombings. These events marked the emergence of the organization then known as Jama'at al-Tawhid wal-Jihad, led by al-Zarqawi, to prominence as a major force within the insurgency. This organization, composed both of foreign fighters and Iraqis, had a militant Sunni Islamist agenda.

=== Spring 2004 uprising ===
Resistance to U.S.-led forces would not for long be confined to the Sunni regions of Iraq. Over this period, Shiite dissatisfaction with the occupation, especially among the urban poor, had been gradually increasing for some of the same reasons it had been among the Sunnis: the perception that the coalition had failed to deliver on its promises and a nationalist dissatisfaction with foreign occupation. Many young men without jobs or prospects and who had lost faith with the promises of the U.S. began to become drawn to Shiite religious radicalism, especially of the brand advocated by the cleric Muqtada al-Sadr. Sadr's distinguished family background, and his fiery anti-occupation rhetoric and calls for the implementation of Islamic law, caused him to emerge as the leader of this portion of Iraqi Shiite society. In June 2003, after being rejected from a spot on the Iraqi Governing Council, he had created a militia known as the Mahdi Army, whose mission he said was to help keep order and cleanse Iraq of "evil." Since that point, the U.S. had regarded him as a threat, but was divided on whether or not to proceed with a crackdown. Eventually, as Sadr's rhetoric heated and his militia paraded through Sadr City in what seemed like a challenge to the United States, they decided to begin to squeeze his movement. On March 29, they moved to close Sadr's newspaper known as al-Hawza and arrested one of his aides on murder charges. That, combined with his steadily decreasing political prospects for success within the U.S.-backed interim government, pushed Sadr to decide for armed revolt.

On April 4, the Mahdi Army was directed to begin launching attacks on coalition targets and to seize control from the nascent U.S.-trained Iraqi security forces. The Mahdi Army, which by then numbered from 3,000 to 10,000 men, organized quickly escalating violent riots and then a coordinated assault, surprising coalition and Iraqi forces and seizing control of Najaf, Kufa, al-Kut, and parts of Baghdad and southern cities like Nasiriyah, Amarah, and Basra. A widespread collapse of the Iraqi security forces ensued, with most deserting or defecting to the rebels rather than fighting. Soon, combat was erupting in many urban centers of southern and central portions of Iraq as U.S. forces attempted to maintain control and prepared for a counteroffensive.

At the same time, the Sunni insurgency was rapidly intensifying. On March 31, 2004, four private military contractors working for the U.S. military were killed and subsequently mutilated by insurgents and a crowd of residents in the city of Fallujah, long a particularly troublesome center of Sunni resistance to the U.S. presence. On the same day, 5 U.S. soldiers were killed by a large IED on a road a few miles outside of the city. The attacks took place as the Marines were taking over responsibility for Al Anbar Governorate, in which Fallujah is located, from the U.S. Army. The intended Marine strategy of patrols, less aggressive raids, humanitarian aid, and close cooperation with local leaders was quickly suspended and the U.S. decided that it was time for a major assault to clear the city of insurgents. On April 4, U.S. and Iraqi forces launched Operation Vigilant Resolve to retake the city, which had clearly fallen completely into rebel hands. They met very stiff and well-organized resistance from the guerrillas. The insurgent force defending Fallujah was believed to number over 2,000 men, divided into platoon-sized units. The guerrillas used sophisticated tactics not seen before in the Iraq war, using standard infantry tactics such as indirect fire support, cover fire, and phased withdrawal. It was noted to resemble a Soviet-style "defense-in-depth" strategy, suggesting guidance from former members of the Iraqi Army rather than foreign jihadis who would more likely used tactics reminiscent of the mujahideen in Afghanistan. After three days of fighting with the U.S. Marines, the insurgents still held three-quarters of the city.

Cases of widespread reach and planning, suggesting national insurgent coordination, were noted. Hundreds of insurgents cut the road between Fallujah and Baghdad to the east, while west of Fallujah in Ramadi, over 150 insurgents launched an offensive against U.S. Marine positions. A similar attack followed, conducted by about 150 insurgents, against U.S. Marines near the Syrian border in Al-Qa'im. The assaults were beaten back, but the U.S. toll from the combined attacks numbered in the dozens.

Political pressure began to build on the United States and the Governing Council of Iraq as the hospital of Fallujah continued to report high numbers of civilian casualties, inflaming further the Iraqi people and Muslim world in general. After two weeks of fighting, the U.S. Marines were on the verge of capturing, but had not yet taken central control of, the city of Fallujah. Pentagon leaders, fearing that continuing the effort to capture the city might further inflame a larger revolt against coalition authority, pulled back the forces. The Marines were ordered to stand-down and cordon off the city on April 30, where they would remain in a perimeter around the city for the following six months.

A compromise on April 30 was reached in order to ensure security within Fallujah itself by creating the "Fallujah Brigade", a unit that drew from former members of Iraq's Army, local volunteers, and even the insurgents themselves. The unit's formation was part of a truce negotiation. This unit was to act under the control of the Coalition Provisional Authority, patrol alongside the Iraqi Police and National Guardsmen but maintain its autonomy. The Fallujah Brigade had many former Saddam loyalists. From various reports, Brigade members re-integrated themselves into the insurgent outfits that dominated. The city remained under the control of insurgent and rebel forces. Reportedly, Abu Musab al-Zarqawi's organization was among the several that exercised some authority in the area.

By the end of the spring uprising, the cities of Fallujah, Samarra, Baqubah, and Ramadi had been left under Sunni guerrilla control with American patrols in the cities ceased. The insurgency had undergone another major shift, as insurgent organizations now had safe havens in cities such as Fallujah to develop and coordinate with each other. Al-Zarqawi's group and its allies were in a period of uneasy cooperation with other insurgent groups dominated by nationalist and Ba'athist agendas, although the groups increasingly came into competition for territory within Sunni insurgent-controlled areas.

U.S. forces launched only occasional armored forays into Samarra and Baquba, while about half a dozen small forts were maintained by the U.S. Marines in Ramadi, with the surrounding territory in the city controlled by rebels. American ground forces remained outside of Fallujah, though regular air strikes were conducted on alleged safehouses of Abu Musab al-Zarqawi's followers in the city. With the battle for Fallujah over, the Sunni insurgency continued against the U.S. forces remaining outside these cities as the guerrillas resumed their tactics of using IED's and mortars to attack U.S. forces indirectly, for the most part avoiding direct combat.

Meanwhile, the fighting continued in the Shiite south. Over the next three months, over 1,500 Mahdi Army militiamen, several hundred civilians, and dozens of coalition soldiers were killed as the U.S. gradually took back the southern cities. On June 6, a truce was reached, temporarily ending the fighting. Sadr entered into negotiations with the provisional government to lay down arms and enter the political process, while the U.S. declared that the Mahdi Army had been militarily defeated when Brigadier General Mark Hertling, a top U.S. commander in charge of Najaf, Iraq, stated, "The Moqtada militia is militarily defeated. We have killed scores of them over the last few weeks, and that is in Najaf alone. [...] The militia have been defeated, or have left..." However, Sadr remained in control of parts of Najaf and Sadr City, while the U.S. continued to patrol in the south outside those areas.

=== Transfer of sovereignty (June–July 2004) ===
On June 28, 2004, the occupation was formally ended by the coalition, which transferred power to a new Iraqi government led by Prime Minister Iyad Allawi. With the situation in the south seemingly settled and the transfer of power, many hoped that the steam would be taken out of the ongoing Sunni insurgency. Although many Iraqis were optimistic about the government, militants saw it as little more than an American puppet and continued the fight unabated. On July 18, guerrillas offered a $285,000 reward for Allawi's assassination.

=== The Battle for Najaf, the Truce Agreement, and aftermath (August–September 2004) ===
Soon, however, the peace in the south would once again be broken. The U.S. Marines, having taken control from the U.S. Army of the area around Najaf, began to adopt a more aggressive posture with the Mahdi Army and began patrolling zones previously considered off-limits. Soon, the Mahdi Army declared that the truce had been broken and militiamen launched an assault on a police station. U.S. forces responded, and in the first week of August, a prolonged conflict broke out in Najaf (one of the holiest cities in Shi'ite Islam) over control of the Imam Ali shrine, often thought of as the holiest Shi'ite Muslim shrine in Iraq. Heavy combat ensued in the Old City of Najaf around the shrine and in the Wadi al-Salam (Valley of Peace) cemetery, one of the largest cemeteries in the world. The terrain of the cemetery, densely packed with above-ground mausoleums and caves, favored the urban guerrilla warfare conducted by Sadr's militia. It was described by U.S. soldiers as "jungle warfare without the jungle." Nevertheless, U.S. forces continued a steady advance and inflicted heavy casualties on Sadr's forces, lightly wounding Sadr himself.

Eventually, after three weeks of fighting, Sadr's forces, which originally had at least 2,000 militiamen spread out throughout the city and the cemetery, was reduced to only a few hundred holding out within the shrine itself. Although much of the fighting was conducted by US forces, it was anticipated that only Iraqi forces would enter the shrine. Negotiations with cleric Muqtada al-Sadr, a leading Shi'ite cleric in Iraq and leader of the Mahdi Army defending the shrine, were attempted but did not end the standoff. On August 25, Grand Ayatollah Ali al-Sistani, aged 73, arrived in Iraq and began traveling towards Najaf to stop the bloodshed. By the next day, an agreement brokered by Sistani seemed to come into force. Although the exact terms of the agreement were not clear, it required the Mahdi militia to disarm and vacate Najaf and for U.S. troops to withdraw from the city; these forces were to be replaced by interim government security forces. An interim government spokesman said al-Sadr's supporters could join the political process and al-Sadr may remain free. These requirements were essentially the same as those under the truce agreed on in June. According to the agreement, Ayatollah Sistani would also take over responsibility for the Imam Ali Shrine; fighters would leave the shrine, and visitors will be allowed in; additionally, the Iraqi interim government would agree to repair damage to buildings caused by the fighting. This resolution occurred two days before the one-year anniversary of the assassination of Sayed Mohammed Baqir al-Hakim, a prominent Shi'ite cleric from Najaf.

While for the most part both the Mahdi Army and U.S. forces observed the truce by withdrawing from Najaf and returning control to the Iraqi government, many of the remnants of Sadr's militia in Najaf kept their weapons and moved north into Sadr City in order to regroup. Negotiations involving the U.S. and local leaders in Sadr City for the disarmament of the local guerrillas and the veterans of the fighting in Najaf had broken down by early September. The Mahdi Army, which may not have been acting under Mr. Sadr's orders, refused any agreement that allowed U.S. patrolling Sadr City or which involved the handing in of their weapons. As a result, renewed heavy fighting began on September 6 between U.S. forces and Shiite militiamen in Sadr City. The first few days of fighting killed at least 2 U.S. soldiers and dozens of Iraqis, both civilians and fighters. In combination with a car bombing that killed 7 U.S. Marines and 3 Iraqi soldiers nine miles north of Fallujah, as well as an increase in IED attacks by Sunni insurgents in Baghdad, the total U.S. death toll for the Iraq war passed 1,000 on September 7, 2004.

=== Coalition counteroffensive against Sunni insurgency begins (September–November 2004) ===
With the violent threat from Sadr's forces eliminated throughout most of Iraq, coalition forces and the Iraqi government began turning their attention towards bringing under control the numerous Sunni guerrilla safe-havens that remained from the spring uprising. Officials from the U.S.-led coalition and Allawi's government began drawing up plans to retake guerrilla strongholds in advance of the parliamentary elections planned for January 2005 in Iraq. Many observers and coalition officials feared that by leaving swaths of territory under guerrilla control (and the populations living in those areas therefore unable to vote), the legitimacy of the elections would be compromised. The cities under the least firm guerrilla control would be taken first, with Fallujah, the heart of the insurgency, waiting until after the U.S. presidential election.

Changes within the Sunni insurgency were also taking place over this period. Jama'at al-Tawhid wal-Jihad, which changed its name to Tanzim Qaidat al-Jihad fi Bilad al-Rafidayn (Al-Qaeda in Iraq (AQI)) on October 17 following a communique from al-Zarqawi declaring allegiance to Osama bin Laden, was aggressively seeking leadership of the insurgency and asserting control over swathes of Sunni territory (including on Haifa Street in Baghdad itself).

The first of the offensives began on September 1, 2004, when U.S. and Iraqi forces besieged the northern Turkmen city of Tal Afar, located west of Mosul. U.S. forces said that the town was being used as a transit point for the entry of foreign guerrillas of al-Qaeda in Iraq and weapons from nearby Syria. After a 12-day siege, the city was stormed and retaken by U.S. and Iraqi troops on September 12. At least 58 people were reported killed in the fighting.

The next stage of the offensive began on September 30, when 3,000 soldiers from the U.S. Army 1st Infantry Division and 2,000 Iraqi troops launched a surprise attack on guerrilla-controlled Samarra. The insurgent hold on the city proved to be tenuous, and the rebel forces were quickly beaten back by U.S. armor and air power. Rather than fighting, most of the guerrillas either fled the city or melted into the population. The U.S. estimated that 130 insurgents and 1 U.S. soldier were killed, although residents reported that many civilians were among the dead. The operation was declared a success by the U.S. military on October 4. U.S. troops also reported achieving freedom of movement in Baquba, also north of Baghdad, though neither city was fully "pacified".

The next phase began soon afterwards, on October 5, when 3,000 coalition and Iraqi troops began a sweep against Sunni insurgents through northern Babil province just south of Baghdad, an area also known as the "Triangle of Death" for the amount of hostage-taking and guerrilla violence in the area. Coalition forces moved west from their forward operating bases across the Euphrates River, securing a key bridge and conducting house-to-house searches. Once again, the insurgents, and surprisingly much of the civilian population, melted away before the offensive rather than fighting, taking shelter in nearby areas. Small-scale rebel harassment was reported, but not major fighting. As a result, the operation saw little success in netting rebel fighters.

At the same time, negotiations involving the Iraqi interim government, tribal leaders, and Mahdi Army officials successfully brought a resolution to the fighting in Sadr City. A weapons handover was announced, and some weapons trickled into the Iraqi police from Shiite rebels. Although the Mahdi Army retained some of its weapons stockpiles, it was no longer an official active participant in the violent Iraqi revolt. Sadr repeatedly signalled a desire to participate in the elections, though he did not compromise his strong anti-occupation stance.

This left the heart of the Sunni insurgency, Fallujah, bracing for an attack. Large numbers of U.S. Army troops and Marines began massing in bases ringing the city, and most of the civilian population fled. To support the buildup, British forces deployed the Black Watch regiment, composed of 850 men, from Basra to the "triangle of death" south of Baghdad in order to replace U.S. troops heading for Fallujah. The decision proved controversial in Britain, especially after the regiment suffered casualties from dogged attacks involving suicide bombers and roadside bombs.

=== Battle for Fallujah and aftermath (November 2004 – January 2005) ===
The U.S. and Iraqi buildup around Fallujah continued, and by the beginning of November and the time of the U.S. presidential elections, over 5,000 U.S. and 1,000 Iraqi troops surrounded the city. The Iraqi troops were drawn from what were considered the most capable segments of the U.S.-trained Iraqi security forces and were mainly drawn from the Shiite regions of Iraq. On November 8, the assault on Fallujah began in Operation Phantom Fury. Many guerrillas had apparently slipped out amongst the fleeing civilians, leaving a force of 5,000 still remaining in the city out of a force of what had grown to 10,000 insurgents (according to estimates). The vast majority of the civilian population by this time had fled, although thousands remained (either because they lacked means of transportation or because they were guarding their property).

A concentrated barrage of air strikes and artillery (including use of white phosphorus and napalm) began pounding the city. Simultaneously, U.S. and Iraqi forces began advancing, primarily from the north, and quickly secured the city's main hospital, where rebels had reported high numbers of civilian deaths in April. Guerrilla resistance was initially reported to be less than expected, partially due to diversionary tactics and also because much of the insurgent force in Fallujah had fled.

Ruined homes across the city attest to a strategy of overwhelming force. A video showing the killing of at least one unarmed and wounded man by an American serviceman surfaced, throwing renewed doubt and outrage at the efficiency of the US occupation. The Marine was later cleared of any wrongdoing, as the Marines had been warned that the enemy would sometimes feign death and booby-trap bodies as a tactic to lure Marines to their deaths. November was the deadliest month of the occupation for coalition troops, surpassing April.

By November 9, U.S. units had penetrated into the heart of the city. By now, they were receiving stiff opposition from small groups of guerrillas, employing hit-and-run tactics, and snipers. Booby traps, rigged to destroy homes U.S. troops had entered, also were encountered, including some even attached to corpses. Within a week, 38+ U.S. troops had been killed and 275+ wounded in the offensive. Insurgent losses during that same time period were believed to be much heavier, running into several hundred.

Gradually, U.S. and Iraqi forces pushed the main insurgent force into the southwest of the city, carefully conducting house-to-house searches and securing areas of the city block by block. The U.S. military adopted a "hammer and anvil" strategy, in which they hoped to methodically push the insurgents into the southwestern corner of the city and up against the open desert (where they would be without cover or concealment and open to a final rout by U.S. firepower). Although they encountered great difficulties against the evasive guerrilla bands, the majority of the insurgents in the city had been killed or captured by late November. Significant guerrilla resistance, however, continued until January (much of it by insurgents operating out of pre-prepared hidden tunnels).

By the end of most of the fighting, over 50 U.S. Marines had been killed and several hundred wounded. As many as 3,000–4,000 insurgents may have been killed, according to U.S. military estimates. Reports suggested a heavy toll among remaining civilians in the city as well. Most of the city suffered severe damage from the fighting by the battle's end. In the months to come, only a small fraction of refugees from the city would permanently return.

The attack on Fallujah had unintended consequences for much of the rest of Iraq. Insurgents fleeing Fallujah filtered into northern Babil province, Mosul in the north, and Baghdad itself. As a result, a sharp spike of violence was seen upon the attack's commencement, with mortar and IED attacks increasing in frequency and intensity. The campaign of suicide bombings and car bombings, mainly affecting Iraqi civilians, intensified to the worst point ever seen. The worst violence was seen in Mosul. Insurgents launched a massive offensive, seizing the western (Arab) half of the city and effectively destroying the police force at the same time the U.S. launched its assault on Fallujah. On November 16, over 3,000 U.S. troops and a similar number of Iraqi troops launched a counteroffensive, dismantling insurgents from strategic points but failing to break their hold on most of the city.

Mosul, which a year earlier was relatively peaceful compared to much of Iraq, would be a scene of some of the heaviest sustained fighting for some time to come. In December, 14 American soldiers were killed and over a hundred injured when an explosion struck an open-tent mess hall in Mosul, where President Bush had displayed a Thanksgiving turkey the year before. It was one of the most costly attacks on U.S. troops during the war – the explosion is believed to have come from a suicide bomber.

With the year's end, the U.S. military reported that they had killed or captured at least 15,000 guerrillas over the course of 2004, giving a new perspective on the intensity of the fighting during that period. 848 U.S. soldiers were killed in 2004, and 9,034 were wounded in action. There are no exact figures, but thousands of Iraq security forces, as well as Iraqi civilians, were killed as well, both in terrorist attacks and from U.S. aerial bombardment and accidental shootings.

=== Iraqi elections and aftermath (January–March 2005) ===
On 31 January 2005, an election for a government to draft a permanent constitution took place. Although some violence and lack of widespread Sunni participation marred the event, most of the eligible Kurd and Shia populace participated.

Although no major cities were now under the control of rebels, the spike of increased guerrilla violence against U.S. and Iraqi forces continued into January. The focus of attention was now on the impending elections set for January 31. Many rebels became intent on disrupting the elections, and conducted an intense campaign of assassinations and suicide bombings on Iraqis involved with them. 107 U.S. soldiers were also killed in the month running up to the elections. By now, Iraqi police and security forces trained by the U.S. seemed to be beginning to take a more prominent role in many towns and cities of Iraq, and were beginning to bear the brunt of the violence. At least 109 Iraqi troops and police were killed in the month before the elections.

Despite the renewed insurgent effort, on January 31 the elections proceeded as scheduled. The Shiite and Kurdish populations, encouraged by their leaders, turned out in large numbers to the polls. With the heavy security presence on that day, the guerrillas failed to successfully conduct any large attacks and the elections were largely seen as a success. The Sunni population, however, responding to a boycott call by their clerics and intimidated by insurgents, largely stayed at home. As a result, the Sistani-endorsed largely Shiite ticket and the Kurdish parties received the largest share of the votes, leaving the Sunni minority disenfranchised.

Following the elections, insurgent attacks again declined and U.S. casualty rates were reduced as negotiations went on to decide on the makeup of the new government. March saw one of the least deadly months of the war for the U.S., with only 38 American troops killed. At least 200 Iraqi security forces were killed that month, however, as their more visible presence attracted the most attacks.

On 4 February, Paul Wolfowitz announced that 15,000 U.S. troops whose tours of duty had been extended in order to provide election security would be pulled out of Iraq by the next month. It was hoped to be the start of a gradual US withdrawal by many, but this was later proved to be untrue. February, March, and April proved to be relatively peaceful months compared to the carnage of November and January, with insurgent attacks averaging 30 a day from the average 70. This was also hoped by many to be the beginning of the end of the insurgency due to the renewed confidence in the elections, but this again proved untrue.

Hopes for a quick end to an insurgency and a withdrawal of U.S. troops where dashed at the advent of May, the Iraq's bloodiest month since the invasion of U.S. forces in March and April 2003. Suicide bombers, believed to be radical Islamist Sunni insurgents, tore through Iraq. Its targets where often Shia gatherings or civilian concentrations mainly of Shiites. As a result, over 700 Iraqi civilians died in the month, as well as 80 U.S. soldiers.

=== Announcement of the Government and Renewed Fighting (April–December 2005) ===
The talks for the new government seemed to continually drag on over the months and a power vacuum began to develop in Baghdad as Allawi waited to hand over power. As the political progress slowed, guerrilla attacks also began to gradually rise once more in April. Insurgents began a renewed effort to dispel any beliefs that they were weakening and to discredit the formation of the new government. The attacks gradually increased until, on April 28, the new government led by Prime Minister Ibrahim Jafarri of the Sistani-backed political party was announced.

Once the new government was announced, the Iraqi insurgency began a major offensive against civilian targets across Iraq for the next several months, killing thousands of civilians. This was considered by analysts to be a direct challenge to the authority of the Iraqi government, and although the U.S. and Iraqi armies attempted to quell the violence using large-scale, house-to-house operations in Baghdad, Tal Afar, and elsewhere, the bombings were only temporarily halted while the insurgency regrouped and planned a new offensive.

The Sunni insurgency continued to launch bomb attacks, suicide bombings, and mortar strikes against both civilian targets and coalition forces, mostly U.S. troops. Iraqi forces began sustaining heavier casualties fighting the insurgency, with more and more Iraqi troops and police engaged in pitched battles and coming under direct attack. An increasing sectarian overtone to the conflict became more visible, as most of the insurgents were Sunni Arab and the vast majority of the recruits to the Iraqi security forces came from the Shia regions of the southern Iraq.

Al-Anbar province, the westernmost and largest province of Iraq (containing the cities of Fallujah and Ramadi) was where the largest amount of combat continued to take place, with U.S. soldiers routinely suffering casualties in military operations against insurgents. At the same time, the insurgency within al-Anbar was increasingly being dominated by the Islamist insurgent group al-Qaeda in Iraq. Militants from the group had increasingly been asserting control over the major cities and towns of the province. Tribal leaders and former Ba'athists, who had previously led the fight against American troops, unsuccessfully resisted this takeover for a short time during the fall of 2005. Elsewhere in Iraq, especially in the Kurdish north and Shi'a south, violence was not as intense.

On September 10, thousands of Iraqi soldiers, backed by Coalition forces, assaulted Tal Afar in search of suspected Sunni Arab insurgents. The U.S. military and the Iraqi government asserted that the town had turned into an important way station for the Sunni insurgency, particularly al-Qaeda in Iraq. Tal Afar had been reported as a conduit for equipment and local fighters smuggled in from Syria. Prime Minister Ibrahim Jaafari ordered Iraqi forces to commence the operation to remove all insurgent elements. The operation was later declared successful at removing the city from the control of Sunni insurgents.

During the fall of 2005, insurgents, suspected to be mostly of al-Qaeda in Iraq, launched a new round of massive suicide bombings against Shia populations, declaring an all-out war on the Shi'a majority. Hundreds of Shi'a workers, soldiers, and civilians were killed in several of these individual strikes. Shia anger was quelled by Grand Ayatollah Ali al-Sistani, who forbade revenge attacks and kept the Shia populace in line and in support of the government.

=== New Iraqi elections and the threat of civil war ===
When the elections for parliament occurred on December 15, 2005, insurgents pledged not to disrupt them, and the day passed peacefully. Until the New Year of 2006, few major attacks occurred on either U.S. soldiers or on Iraqi civilians and troops. The insurgency remained quiet, launching small-scale bomb attacks that were, in comparison to the hundreds of dead in suicide attacks during the fall, relatively minor affairs.

== Aftermath ==
On February 22, 2006, suspected Sunni rebels, dressed as Iraqi police commandos, stormed the Al Askari Mosque in Samarra—a mosque particularly holy to the Shi'a majority and the location where several imams are buried. Although there were no casualties in the attack, the bombing leveled the mosque and caused unprecedented anger amongst the Shi'a majority, prompting death squads, largely from the Mahdi Army, to roam the streets of Baghdad and other major cities, attacking Sunni mosques, killing Sunni civilians and murdering Sunni clerics. The Sunni insurgents and populace soon organized into their own defensive units and death squads and began further revenge killings, causing a spiral of violence that took the country into a full blown civil war.

Violence throughout the spring was largely dominated by inter-Iraqi fighting, leaving the U.S.-led coalition forces unsure of their next move as death squads engaged in tit-for-tat revenge killings. U.S. commanders were forced to admit that this level of violence was unprecedented in the three years of American occupation and reconstruction, although both political and military leaders in the United States and Iraq continued to insist that the country was not on the verge of civil war. The Interior Ministry, the ministry responsible for internal policing and headed by a Shi'a party (the Islamic Supreme Council of Iraq), was suspected of utilizing entire police squads for sectarian killings and torture. Sunni communities grew fearful of approaching Iraqi police commandos, and some that had stayed out of the insurgency and the revenge killings formed militias to defend themselves against what they viewed as Shi'a aggression and encroachment. Often, these militias would open fire on police or army units that were not accompanied by American or otherwise coalition soldiers.

Suicide attacks dropped during the period in exchange for largely underreported single killings, and also included a few spectacular, brazen daylight raids on Sunni or Shi'a communities by masked gunmen who executed large numbers of opposing sect members. Bomb attacks on Sadr City, the stronghold of the Mahdi Army, resulted in the Mahdi Army moving onto the streets to exact revenge on largely uninvolved Sunni civilians. Neither the U.S. Army, nor the Iraqi Defense Ministry, were making headway in stopping the attacks. By June 2006, the UN reported that 100 civilians a day were dying in Baghdad alone due to sectarian violence.

On June 7, 2006, U.S. warplanes bombed a house north of Baghdad where terror leader Abu Musab al-Zarqawi and several top associates were holding a meeting. The attack leveled the structure and killed al-Zarqawi. His death was announced a day later by U.S. military officials after they had confirmed that they had actually hit their target. Al-Qaeda in Iraq confirmed his death and quickly appointed a successor, Abu Ayyub al-Masri. U.S. military forces hailed it as a major blow against the insurgency. However, by June, the threat had shifted from Sunni insurgents, now reportedly in open talks with coalition and government officials on the circumstances regarding a truce or cease-fire, and foreign terrorists to the Shi'a and Sunni militias that roamed the streets of Baghdad and attacked one another's communities, dividing the city in two sectarian regions. Large swaths of Baghdad became no-go zones for large segments of the population because they were either Shi'a or Sunni militia territory.

In July 2006, the U.S. military started to bolster its troop numbers in the city—a concession to the seriousness of the situation and the inability of local forces under Iraqi command to combat it. The new security crackdown, which also involved a number of Iraqi troops, was called Operation Together Forward. The operation ultimately failed to stem the tide of the attacks. Meanwhile, Prime Minister Nouri al-Maliki began drawing up plans to end the violence and reconcile Sunni and Shi'a. Many observers, however, have doubted al-Maliki's commitment towards seeking a truly equitable resolution to the conflict (on account of his Shia biases).

A Pentagon report from September 1, 2006 said attacks had risen by 24% in the month from June to August 2006 as violence spread north beyond Baghdad. Iraqi casualties soared by 51% during the same period. Analysts said disarming militias would be difficult because of their ties with political parties. The Badr Organization, the armed wing of the powerful Supreme Council for the Islamic Revolution in Iraq party, a partner in Maliki's coalition, was a product of Iran's Revolutionary Guards. In fresh violence on September 9, 2006, 16 bodies, all bound, blindfolded, and shot, were found in different areas of Mahmudiya, south of Baghdad. Police said they were unable to identify them because they were not carrying identity cards.

== See also ==
- List of modern conflicts in the Middle East
- Al-Qaeda in Iraq
- Shia–Sunni relations

== Sources ==
- Reuters
- CNN
- Albawaba.com
- BBC
- BBC
