= Siege of Basra (2007) =

Battle of the Iraq War

Coordinates: 30°30′N 47°49′E

- Part of the Iraq War
- Map of UK bases in Basra: airport on the left, Basra Palace on the right
Date	27 February – 3 September 2007 (6 months and 1 week)
Location	Basra, Iraq
Result	Mahdi Army victory

Belligerents
United Kingdom	Mahdi Army

Strength
6,200	≈1,000

The siege of Basra was initiated by the Mahdi Army (Jaysh al-Mahdi) to capture the city of Basra in 2007. Following the reported major failure of the coalition forces, whose purpose was to stabilise Basra and prepare it for the turning over of security to Iraqi government forces, the city was overrun by insurgent forces from three different Iraqi factions including the Mahdi Army, and the British found themselves under major siege in their bases and capable of conducting only limited defence action in armoured convoys.

== The bases ==
By February 2007, there were only four British bases remaining in Basra. One was on the outskirts of the city at the Basra Airport, known as the Contingency Operating Base, with a garrison of 5,000 personnel from all three services, mostly Army and Royal Air Force (RAF) personnel. The second base was located to the southeast of the city at Basra Palace, a former palace of Saddam Hussein, with a garrison of 700 soldiers. The third base was located to the northern edge of the city, on the river by Sinbad Island at the Shatt-Al-Arab Hotel, with a garrison of 600 soldiers. The fourth was located in the city centre, at the old state building, garrisoned by a detached company of British troops, numbering around 80 soldiers, along with the nearby PJOC.

== Siege ==
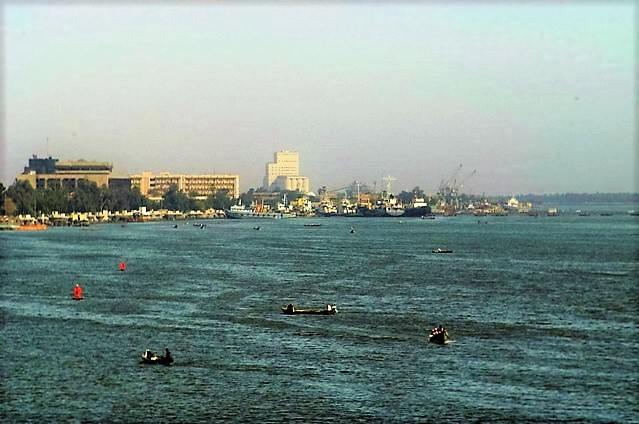
Basra city

The first British soldier to die in the city following Operation Sinbad was Rifleman Daniel Lee Coffey of 2nd Battalion, The Rifles, who was killed on 27 February while returning to the Shatt-Al-Arab Hotel.

During the siege, the British base at the airport was constantly bombarded by Mahdi Army mortar and rocket fire, upwards of dozens of times a day. Despite the weight of fire, there was relatively little disruption to operations, as considerable effort had been put into force protection measures. These included passive measures on the base, such as physical hardening of structures, and active measures, such as fighting patrols conducted by RAF Regiment squadrons in the base's ground defence area, beyond the perimeter.

The Uti Triangle, a flat zone combining open wasteland, marsh and clustered buildings, was being used by the Mahdi Army to launch mortar and rocket attacks on both the airport and the Basra Palace. Aggressive patrols had denied the militias the opportunity to use the airport's ground defence area for launching anything other than a small number of rockets. However, this may have had the effect of forcing the militias to use firing points that were further away, which meant that larger rockets, with correspondingly larger warheads, were used.

More than 300 rockets struck the airport between June and August. Sniper attacks were also a deadly and common occurrence for British service personnel as well as IED attacks on patrols that departed out of the bases. The old state building was under heavy siege, particularly suffering from sniper attacks from overlooking buildings and RPG attacks from 'RPG alley' in the champagne glass area of the Al Tuwasia district. The IED attacks and organised ambushes also struck convoys departing the airport that were transporting food, fuel, ammunition and other equipment for the bases in Basra. An example of this was on 4 April, on a stretch of highway in the Hayaniyah district on the north-western outskirts of Basra, when a Warrior AFV was struck by a massive bomb explosion which wrecked the vehicle and left a three-foot crater in the road. Four British soldiers and their interpreter were killed in the blast. Convoys had primarily been used for this task because helicopters were at high risk from being shot down.

=== Retreat from Basra Palace ===
On 3 September, under the cover of darkness and without any media attention, the British Army withdrew from Basra Palace to the airport, leaving their last foothold it had in the city. Basra was abandoned to the militias.

== Aftermath ==
Following the withdrawal to Basra Airport, British forces were criticized by U.S. officials in private discussions for withdrawing from central Basra and ceding effective control to militias. Formally, control of the city had been handed over to Iraqi security forces, in effect however, the control of the city was in the hands of radical militias. The competing militias entered into a turf war in the coming months for control of the city, and up to 100 people, mostly civilians, were being reported killed each month. A black market monopoly formed over the oil exports from the city.

At the end of March 2008, the situation in the city led to an Iraqi troop surge into the city and the subsequent 2008 battle of Basra. This operation, named 'Charge of the Knights', eventually led to an estimated 210 Mahdi Army fighters killed, 600 wounded, and 155 captured.

British forces remained in control of Basra Airport until 2009, when it was handed over to Iraqi civilian control. The RAF's 7 Force Protection Wing and No. 15 Squadron RAF Regiment were the last British forces to leave the base. Coincidentally, these same units were the last British forces to leave Camp Bastion, Helmand, Afghanistan, in November 2014.

== See also ==
- Battle of Amarah
- Battle of Diwaniya
- Iraq War
- Iraqi insurgency
- List of United Kingdom Military installations used during Operation Telic
