= Battle of the CIMIC House =

2004 battle in Iraq

CIMIC-House
- Part of the occupation of Iraq (2003–2011)
Date	5 August 2004 – 28 August 2004
Location	Southern Iraq
Result	British Victory

Belligerents
United Kingdom	Mahdi Army

Commanders and leaders
Major Justin Featherstone; Captain Charles "Charlie" Curry; Maj James 'JD' Driscoll	Muqtada al-Sadr

Strength
106	500+

Casualties and losses
9 killed 19 wounded	200+ confirmed killed

CIMIC House was the British Army-led Multi-National Division (South-East)'s centre of Civil-Military Co-operation (CIMIC) activities in the Iraqi town of Al Amarah during the 2003–2011 occupation of Iraq. It was situated in the former residence of the Ba'ath Party governor of Maysan province. It was before the Battle of Maysan al Amarah (2006) Determined to capture the strong point, militiamen of the Shia Mahdi Army launched sustained attacks on the British positions at CIMIC House and the neighbouring Pink Palace, the seat of local government, beginning on 5 August 2004.

Al Amarah was garrisoned by two troops of soldiers from A Squadron, Queen's Royal Lancers (QRL), fewer than 90 soldiers from Y Company, 1st Battalion, the Princess of Wales's Royal Regiment (including a large contingent of Territorial Army elements from the 52nd Lowland Regiment mobilized to serve with the PWRR and QRL Battle Groups in April 2004), and 60 soldiers from the Royal Welch Fusiliers. These units were part of the 1st Mechanised Brigade on TELIC IV. The forces in Amarah were isolated some 20 miles (32 km) from the main Battle Group in Abu Naji, and dependent on convoys for resupply. During the siege, they faced an estimated 500 militiamen who launched a total of 86 assaults on the compound over the next 23 days, ranging from section strength up to a series of company-level assaults with 100-plus fighters.

Incoming fire from the Mahdi Army included 595 mortar rounds from 230 different bombardments, direct hits with 57 rocket-propelled grenades and six 107 mm rockets, and 86 ground assaults on CIMIC House itself. Y Company, 1 PWRR, based at CIMIC House, became the most attacked company in the entire Iraqi theatre of operations. In defending the compound, the British fired 33,000 rounds, many Challenger 2, Warrior, and High Explosive 81mm mortar shells, and managed to persuade the US Air Force to drop a precision laser-guided 500lb bomb onto enemy mortar positions in open ground in the middle of a built up-city. The defence of their positions and attempts to repel the Mahdi Army was described by Y Company's Sergeant Dan Mill's book Sniper One as "the longest continuous action fought by the British Army since the Korean War 50 years ago". It was also the "lengthiest defensive stand since World War II".

Fighting reached a peak between 5-25 August when the intensity was such that armoured convoys were unable to reach the base to resupply the British, although none of the waves of infantry attacks by the Mahdi Army reached within 30 metres of the British defence lines. During this time, commanding officer Major Justin Featherstone was given permission to withdraw by his commanding officer if he felt events on the ground required it. Major Featherstone refused to have his men leave their posts. Captain Charlie Curry was given command for six days during this time when Major Featherstone went on R&R.

At the end of the siege, six British soldiers had been seriously injured in the battle; the only fatality on the British side was Private Chris Rayment, who died when a traffic barrier fell on his head, after the linkage was caught by a Snatch Land Rover which was entering the camp in a convoy, under heavy enemy fire.

The British estimated Mahdi Army casualties at the end of the battle to be at more than 200 dead, leaving them as a seriously depleted force in Al Amarah, incapable of attacking the British in large numbers for the remainder of the coalition's occupation of the town. CIMIC House was handed over to the Iraqis at the end of August 2004, with the British consolidating their forces in Camp Abu Naji.

The defence of CIMIC House was supported by armoured infantry soldiers of B Company and C Company 1PWRR based at camp Abu Naji who were engaged in numerous pitch battles with the Mahdi Army on the streets of Al Amarah. A contingent of Territorial Army soldiers that defended the CIMIC House included one Warrior AFV from B Company, Black Watch, snipers from 1st Battalion, 22nd Cheshire Regiment, and Soldiers from various different squadrons of the Royal Yeomanry regiment.
