= Battle of Diwaniya =

2006 Iraq War battle

- Part of the Post-invasion Iraq
Date	28 August 2006
Location	Al Diwaniyah, Iraq
Result	Ceasefire

Belligerents
First Battle: (Iraq) Iraq; Second Battle: United States	First Battle; Mahdi Army; Second Battle: Diwaniyah State

Casualties and losses
First Battle: 23 killed (Iraq claims most were executed); Second Battle: (United States) 1 tank damaged	First Battle: 20 killed 10 captured Second Battle: 30 killed
- 7 civilians killed

The Battle of Diwaniya took place in Al Diwaniyah, 180 kilometers (111 mi) south of Baghdad, on 28 August 2006 between the Mahdi Army and the Iraqi Army.

The fighting erupted after coalition troops arrested a Sadr militia leader. The militia engaged in heavy street fighting with Iraqi soldiers which lasted late into the night. Militia fighters were entrenched in residential areas during the fighting. The Iraqi Army claims that most of its casualties occurred when Mahdi militiamen captured and executed a group of soldiers who had run out of ammunition. By next morning a ceasefire was in place with 23 Iraqi soldiers, 20 militiamen and 7 civilians killed.

About a month and a half later on 9 October 2006 another battle broke out in the city, this time between the militia and the U.S. Army. Thirty militiamen were killed and a U.S. military tank was severely damaged.

== See also ==
- Battle of Amarah
- Operation Black Eagle
- Operation Lion's Leap
- U.S. Occupation of Iraq
