= Operation Iron Saber =

American military operation in Iraq

- Part of the 2004 Spring Fighting of Iraq War
Date	April – June 2004
Location	Najaf, Diwaniyah, Al Kut, Karbala
Result	Coalition victory

Belligerents
United States: 1st Armored Division; 37th Armor Regiment; Ukraine: 6th Mechanized Brigade; Poland; Bulgaria (Iraq) New Iraqi Army	Mahdi Army

Commanders and leaders
Mark Hertling; Lt. Col. Gary Bishop; Serhiy Ostrovskyi	Muqtada al-Sadr

Strength
2,500+	1,500–2,900 (April)

Casualties and losses
3 killed 1 killed (Iraq) 20 killed	7,000 killed 20 captured (per 1st Armored Division)

During Post-invasion Iraq, Operation Iron Saber was a coalition strike aimed at defeating the Mahdi Army under the control of Muqtada al-Sadr in Najaf, Diwaniyah, Al Kut and Karbala. The major American units involved was the 37th Armor Regiment 2nd BN 3rd Field Artillery of 1st Armored Division. The operation was launched in April 2004, and after intense urban warfare which involved Mahdi militiamen taking refuge in mosques, coalition forces had defeated the Mahdi army by June and had forced a cease-fire with al-Sadr.

== See also ==
- 2004 Iraq spring fighting
