= List of British military installations used during the Iraq War =

The British Armed Forces had several temporary military bases in Iraq and Kuwait between 2003 and 2009, most were controlled by Multi-National Division (South-East).

Depending on their size or utility, the facilities are called : Camp, Forward Operating Base (FOB), Combat Outpost (COP), Patrol Base (PB), Outpost, Logistics Base (Log Base), Fire Base (FB).

== Installations ==
=== Iraq ===
Type	Name	Governorate	Opened	Closed	Fate	Notes/Units
Airport	Baghdad	Baghdad	Unknown	2009	Transferred to civilian control	Royal Air Force Westland Puma HC.1s assisted the Foreign and Commonwealth Office until 2009.
Airport	Basrah.	Basra	24 March 2003.	31 March 2009.	Transferred to American Control	53 Field Squadron (Air Support), 39 Engineer Regiment and 10 Field Squadron (Air Support) during TELIC 2. Honourable Artillery Company firstly during Op Telic 4 between April 2004 and October 2004 as a troop size deployment acting as a Brigade Reconnaissance Troop (BRT) and secondly during Telic 5 between October 2004 and April 2005 as a squadron size. 12th (Air Defence) Regiment, Royal Artillery (RA) between February 2003 and May 2003. 9 Supply Regiment RLC as a detachment from March 2003. No. 2620 (County of Norfolk) Squadron RAuxAF Regiment sometime in between February 2003 and August 2003. A small unit of 15 (UK) Psychological Operations Group which moved from Camp Doha, Kuwait. Royal Air Force with unknown aircraft.
Camp	Abu Naji	Maysan		Aug 2006	Transferred to Iraqi Control	Royal Scots Dragoon Guards; 1st Battalion the Staffordshire Regiment; Queen’s Royal Hussars; 6.4 km (4.0 mi) south of COS Garry Owen; 43 km (27 mi) north of Camp Condor
Camp	Bucca	Basra	2003	2010	Transferred to American Control	Adjutant General's Corps (Military Provost Staff) until the Theatre Internment Facility (TIF) until Dec 2003.
Camp	CIMIC House	Maysan	2003			Battle of the CIMIC House
Camp	Chindit	Basra		June 2004	Iraqi Regional Police Academy	Last unit: 1 Royal Anglians.
Camp	Condor	Maysan	2003	Unknown	Abandoned	710 Squadron RLC (V), 6 Supply Regiment, Royal Logistic Corps (RLC). 16 Air Assault Brigade. B Company of 1st Battalion, Argyll and Sutherland Highlanders were deployed here during May 2004. During October 2005 the Staffordshire Regiment were deployed here.
Camp	Coyote	Basra	Unknown	Unknown	Unknown	33 Field Hospital - Commissioned Hospital then handed over to 202 Field Hospital AMS(V).
Camp	Dogwood nr Al Amarah	Basra	Unknown	Unknown	Unknown	9 Supply Regiment - (MBLU unit ?).
Camp	Smitty	Muthanna		Aug 2006	Unknown	
Command Post	Shat al-Arab hotel	Basra	Unknown	July 2009	Unknown	105th Regiment Royal Artillery (Volunteers) attached to 19th Regiment Royal Artillery on Telic 5 with 28 and 143 Batteries.
DTDF	Divisional Temporary Detainment Facility	Basra	2003	Unknown	Unknown	Adjutant General's Corps (Military Provost Staff) from 2003.
FOB	Minden	Basra	Unknown	Unknown	Unknown	1st Battalion Royal Regiment of Fusiliers during a rotation provided protection for the FOB.
Fuel Depot	Name Unknown nr Safwan	Basra	Unknown	Unknown	Unknown	Task Force IX (9 Supply Regiment).
Gas/Oil Separation Plant	Disused	Basra	Unknown	Unknown	Unknown	12th (Air Defence) Regiment, Royal Artillery between February 2003 and May 2003.
Logistics Base	Shaibah	Basra	2003	2007	Transferred to Iraqi Army	See article for units.
Palace	Basra	Basra	2003	3 September 2007	Transferred to American Control	105th Regiment Royal Artillery (Volunteers) - 19th Regiment Royal Artillery during Telic 5 with 5 & 19 Batteries with RAP.
Port	Khor Al Zubair	Basra	Unknown	Unknown	Unknown	9 Supply regiment as a detachment from March 2003.
Port	Umm Qasr	Basra	2003	2009	Port in Civilian hands	127 Battery of 105th Regiment Royal Artillery (V) attached to 19th Regiment Royal Artillery during Telic 5. A detachment of 9 Supply Regiment RLC from March 2003 onwards. 17 Port and Maritime Regiment until May 2003. 165 Port Regiment RLC (V) from May 2003. 84 Medical Supply Squadron, RAMC between May 2003 and June 2003.
Unknown	Az Zabaya	Basra	Unknown	Unknown	Unknown	84 Medical Supply Squadron, RAMC between June 2003 and August 2003.

=== Kuwait ===
Type	Name	Governorate	Opened	Closed	Fate	Notes/Units
Airbase	Ali Al Salem	Al Jahra	2003	2004	Section operated by other force	No. 2620 (County of Norfolk) Squadron RAuxAF Regiment between February and August 2003.
Airbase	Unknown			2009	Reverted to Civilian Control	Royal Air Force - under Operation Kipion with AgustaWestland Merlin helicopters.
Camp	Arifjan	Al Asimah	2003		Unknown	Joint Force Logistics Component based on 102 Logistic Brigade HQ & Signal Squadron (262).
Camp	Doha	Al Asimah	2003	2006	Section operated by other force	Shared with American Forces. A small unit of 15 (UK) Psychological Operations Group before moving to Basrah Airport.
Camp	Eagle		2003	2003	Unknown	Deployed location for 3rd Battalion, Parachute Regiment before crossing the border to Iraq.
Camp	Fox		2003		Unknown	84 Medical Supply Squadron, RAMC between January 2003 and May 2003. 102 Log Bde HQ & Sig Sqn (262) Forward Headquarters.
Port	Shuwaikh	Al Asimah			Unknown	94 Squadron, 9 Supply Regiment RLC.
Port	Unknown				Unknown	17 Port and Maritime Regiment until May 2003. 165 Port Regiment RLC (V) from May 2003.
Port	Unknown				Unknown	17 Port and Maritime Regiment until May 2003. 165 Port Regiment RLC (V) from May 2003.

== See also ==
- Siege of U.K. bases in Basra
- Operation Telic
- Operation Telic order of battle
