= Operation Together =

Operation Together may refer to:

- Operation Together Forward, 2006 operation in Baghdad, Iraq
- Operation Moshtarak (Dari for Together), 2010 operation in Helmand, Afghanistan
