= Battle of Amarah =

2006 Iraq War battle

Coordinates: 31°50′N 47°9′E

- Part of the Post-invasion Iraq
Date	19–20 October 2006 (1 day)
Location	Amarah, Iraq
Result	Mahdi Army victory

Belligerents
Iraq	Mahdi Army

Commanders and leaders
Unknown	Muqtada al-Sadr

Strength
Unknown	800 militiamen

Casualties and losses
10 killed 6 wounded	15 killed 90 wounded

The Battle of Amarah took place from October 19 to October 20, 2006, between the Mahdi Army and police, who were largely members of the Badr Organization. Fighting began on October 19, when 800 masked members of the Mahdi army stormed three police stations in Amarah.

== Battle ==
In mid-October, a roadside bomb killed Qassim al-Tamimi, the chief of investigations for the provincial police force and a member of the rival Badr Organization. Badr fighters blamed the Mahdi Army for the killing and in response to this, the police captured a brother of the suspected bomber, who was a member of the Mahdi Army. Fighting began on October 17, when 800 masked members of the Mahdi army stormed three police stations in Amarah. Several firefights occurred between the militia and police over the course of the next four days.

By the morning of October 20, 2006, local leaders and residents said that victorious Mahdi fighters were patrolling the city on foot and in commandeered police vehicles and were setting up roadblocks. Sheik al-Muhamadawi stated early October 20 that "there is no state in the city. Policemen do not have enough weapons and ammunition compared with the militia, which has all kinds of weapons." At least 27 people were killed and 118 wounded in the clashes.

== See also ==
- Operation Black Eagle
- Operation Lion's Leap
