= 2004 Iraq spring fighting =

Engagements during the Iraq War

- Part of the Iraq War
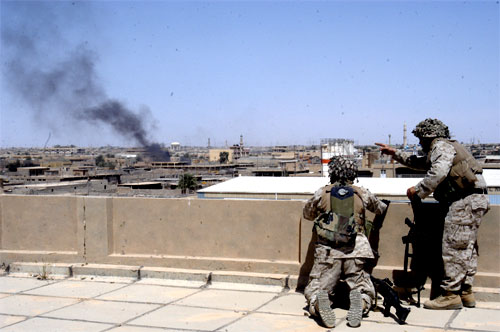
- US Marines peer over a rooftop ledge to fix in enemy targets in Fallujah
Date	April 4, 2004 – June 24, 2004
Location	Iraq
Result	Inconclusive
Territorial changes	Major strategic gains by Insurgents; U.S. manages to retain control of at least 60% of the country

Belligerents
Coalition forces: United States; United Kingdom; Spain; Australia; Poland; New Iraqi Army; Multinational forces in Iraq	Insurgent groups: Jama'at al-Tawhid wal-Jihad; Islamic Army in Iraq; 1920 Revolution Brigade; Army of Mujahideen; Jamaat Ansar al-Sunna; Ansar al-Islam; Mahdi Army; Other insurgent groups and militias

Commanders and leaders
(United States) Gen. John Abizaid (United States) Col. Peter Mansoor	Abu Musab al-Zarqawi (Jama'at al-Tawhid wal-Jihad); Mahdi al-Sumayda'i (Islamist leader); Abdullah al-Janabi (Islamist leader); Omar Hadid (Islamist commander); Muqtada al-Sadr (Mahdi Army)

Strength
200,000	35,000

Casualties and losses
(United States) 217 killed 1 captured 2,500 wounded (Iraq) 150 killed 14,800 deserted Other coalition forces: 16 killed 107 wounded	1,342 killed 430 captured (coalition claim)

The 2004 Iraq spring fighting was a series of operational offensives and various major engagements during the Iraq War. It was a turning point in the war; with the spring fighting marking the entrance into the conflict of militias and religiously based (Shia and Sunni) militant groups, such as the Shia Mahdi Army.

== Prelude ==
A relative lull in violence marked the first few months of 2004. Guerrilla attacks lessened in intensity while insurgent forces reorganized, studying the multinational forces' tactics and planning a renewed offensive.

=== Causes ===
The first cause of the Spring Fighting was the rise of a conservative Shi'a cleric, Muqtada al-Sadr, and his militia, the Mahdi Army, in the south of the country. Muqtada al-Sadr also has great influence in the Sadr City section of Baghdad (Sadr City, which was Saddam City, was renamed after the invasion, in honor of Sadr's father, Grand Ayatollah Mohammad Sadeq al-Sadr). With the fall of Saddam Hussein, Muqtada al-Sadr emerged as a Shia leader by rejecting the US-led occupation of Iraq. Al-Sadr created the Mahdi Army in June 2003.

The second cause, probably the flashpoint for the conflict, was the highly publicized killing and mutilation of four Blackwater private military contractors on March 31, 2004. Five days before American troops withdrew from Fallujah after intense fighting on March 26, 2004 (at which point Fallujah had already been declared insurgent-occupied), one Marine was killed. The troops retreated to the city's outskirts. The four independent contractors were guarding food shipments for a U.S. base on the outskirts of Fallujah, Iraq, when they took a wrong turn and entered the city. They were killed in a grenade attack by suspected insurgents, and their corpses were mutilated by cheering crowds.

=== Provocation and the start of the offensive ===
On March 28, the U.S. overseer of Iraq, Paul Bremer, ordered the 60-day closure of Al-Hawza, a newspaper published by Muqtada al-Sadr's group, on charges of inciting violence against the occupation. The next day, thousands of Iraqis rallied outside Al-Hawza's offices in support of the newspaper. The decision was made to use the 984th MP CO to shut down the newspaper based on information provided by the 148th MP Team (MPI/PIO).

On April 3, Bremer sent troops to al-Sadr's home and arrested Mustafa Yaqoubi, a top lieutenant, sparking further protests.

On April 4, Spanish-led troops clashed with armed demonstrators in Najaf demanding Yaqubi's release, resulting in the death of two coalition soldiers, one American and one Salvadoran, and at least 20 Iraqis. According to one protester, armed supporters of Muqtada al-Sadr, intermingled with the crowd, fired the first shot. The main coalition base at Najaf was defended by the Salvadoran Cuscatlán Battalion, Blackwater contractists and Spanish armoured vehicles, which repelled the attack of several technicals. Four Spanish Pegaso BMR armoured personnel carriers and two VEC-M1 armoured reconnaissance vehicles, amidst heavy hostile fire, broke through the old Najaf prison, used as a recruitment center by the Iraqi Civil Defense Corps. A number of Salvadoran, Honduran and Iraqi soldiers were besieged inside the compound by members of the Mahdi army. One Salvadoran serviceman had been killed and five wounded in the first insurgent assault. The Spanish APC platoon rescued all the personnel in two trips, supported by US Apache helicopters. The same day, al-Sadr issued a statement calling on his supporters to stop staging demonstrations "because your enemy prefers terrorism."

"America has unsheathed its fangs and its despicable intentions, and the conscientious Iraqi people cannot remain silent at all. They must defend their rights in the ways they see fit," the statement said, according to The Washington Post.

A day after the statement given by Sadr, violent protests occurred throughout the Shiite south, soon spilling over into a violent uprising by Mahdi Army militiamen, which was fully underway by April 6, 2004.

Unrest in Basra was also inflamed by the publication of fake torture pictures by Piers Morgan whilst editor of the British Newspaper The Mirror with one officer briefing as such: "Col Black told the press conference: "These photographs are a recruiting poster for al-Qa'eda and every other terrorist organisation. They have made the lives of our Armed Forces in Iraq that much more difficult and dangerous."

== April fighting ==
=== Baghdad and the Shia south ===
The Mahdi Army forces began an offensive in Najaf, Kufa, Kut, and Sadr City on April 4, 2004. They began by taking control of public buildings and police stations. In Sadr City in Baghdad, Iraqi police were expelled from three stations. Members of the newly arrived 1st Cavalry Division and the 759th Military Police Battalion were sent out to retake them. Militiamen ambushed the U.S. forces, and eight U.S. troops were killed, and 51 more were wounded in the bloody battle. U.S. forces subsequently regained control of the police stations after running firefights with Mahdi rebels that killed 35 Mahdi Army militiamen. Mahdi Army members still maintained some influence over many of the slum areas of Sadr City, however. The fighting was not only in Sadr City, but it also spread to other parts of Baghdad throughout the month. The highway linking Baghdad with the western province of Anbar was cut by the insurgents and resupplies for Marines in the province could only be delivered by helicopter.

The militants gained partial control of Karbala after fighting there. Other coalition forces came under attack: in Nasiriyah, two Italian armored vehicles were destroyed, and British forces came under fire in Amarah and Basra. Muqtada al-Sadr militiamen took control of government, police and spiritual sites in Najaf, on April 6, 2004. The main coalition base there came under mortar fire. Kut was seized on the next day after clashes with Ukrainian troops, mainly on the Tigris River bridge. On the same day, Karbala came under full Mahdi Army control. Spanish troops killed seven al-Sadr insurgents in several ambushes in south-central Iraq the following week, before being ordered to withdraw by the new-elected Spanish government.

By April 9, 2004, exactly a year to the day after the statue of Saddam Hussein was symbolically torn down, the US-led forces lost control of all the parts of Iraq that had been gained in the year since that event. The same day, an American fuel convoy of the 13th Corps Support Command came under attack near the Baghdad International Airport. In what was described as a 5-mile long ambush, the 26-vehicle column was pummeled by gunfire, mortar rounds and RPGs, disabling many of the civilian fuel tankers and Army vehicles. A total of 12 people from the convoy were killed: 2 American soldiers, 7 American private truck drivers and 3 Iraqi truck drivers. One American soldier, PFC Keith Matthew Maupin, and an American truck driver, Thomas Hamill, were captured. Hamill managed to escape from his captors on May 2, 2004, while Maupin was executed and his remains recovered four years later.

After sporadic clashes, Coalition forces temporarily suppressed most militia activity in Nasiriyah, Amarah, and Basra. On April 16, Kut was retaken by US forces, and several dozen Mahdi Army members were killed in the battle. However, the area around Najaf and Kufa, as well as Karbala remained under the control of Sadr's forces. Sadr himself was believed to be in hiding in Najaf. Coalition troops put a cordon of 2,500 troops around Najaf, but reduced the number of forces to pursue negotiations with the Mahdi Army. At the beginning of May, coalition forces estimated that there were 200-500 militants still present in Karbala, 300–400 in Diwaniyah, an unknown number still left in Amarah and Basra, and 1,000-2,000 still holed up in the Najaf-Kufa region.

=== Al Anbar operations ===
==== First Battle of Fallujah ====
Coincidentally, the offensive against Fallujah started on the same day that the Shia uprising began. In response to the killing of the four Americans on March 31 and intense political pressure, the U.S. Marines commenced Operation Vigilant Resolve. They surrounded the city with the intent of capturing the individuals responsible for the killings, as well as others in the region who might have been involved in the insurgency or terrorist activities. It was planned that the Iraqi National Guard would fight alongside the U.S. Marines in the operation, but on the dawn of the invasion they discarded their uniforms and deserted. Heavy fighting lasted until April 9, 2004, when, again under enormous public pressure, the offensive was called off because of great civilian losses. At that point, the Marines had only managed to gain control of about 25 percent of the city.

==== Battle of Ramadi ====
During the fighting in Anbar there was also a major insurgent attack on the city of Ramadi on April 6, 2004, which began when a force of 300 insurgents attacked Marine patrols throughout the city in an attempt to relieve pressure on Fallujah. In heavy street fighting over four days 16 U.S. Marines and an estimated 250 insurgents lost their lives.

==== Battle of Husaybah ====
Immediately following the Battle of Ramadi there was another insurgent attack on the town of Husaybah on the Syrian border on April 17, 2004. Like in Ramadi, insurgents attacked the Marine garrison and were repulsed; 5 Marines and 150 insurgents were killed.

==== Fallujah peace attempts ====
The occupying force in Fallujah on April 9 allowed more than 70,000 women, children and elderly residents to leave the besieged city, reportedly also allowing males of military age to leave.

On April 10, the U.S. military declared a unilateral truce to allow for humanitarian supplies to enter Fallujah, and pulled troops back to the outskirts of the city. Local sheikhs and imams refused to honor the cease-fire agreement, and repeatedly sent mujahideen fighters to attack the Marines. The city's main hospital was occupied by Coalition Forces to protect its patients, and a sniper was placed on top of the hospital's water tower. There were also numerous reports of the use of Close Air Support by Coalition Forces in Fallujah during this time, in actions against insurgents.

The U.S. forces sought to negotiate a settlement, but promised to restart the offensive to retake the city if one was not reached. Military commanders said their goal in the siege was to capture those responsible for the numerous deaths of American and Iraqi security personnel. As the siege continued, insurgents continued to conduct hit-and-run attacks on U.S. Marine positions, despite the fact that U.S. Marines were under a unilateral ceasefire. It was also reported that the Marines wanted a cease-fire because they were not being resupplied, due to the insurgent capture of the main highway from Baghdad to Anbar.

On May 1, 2004, U.S. forces withdrew completely from the city, and control of the city was turned over to the Fallujah Brigade (which was under control of a general who had served under Saddam Hussein). The brigade soon allied itself with the insurgents and the city was effectively under insurgent control. Between 731 and 800 Iraqis were killed during the siege of the city, at least 184 of them insurgents, and at least 27 American Marines also died. Soon afterwards, many towns in Anbar province - such as Karabilah, Sada, Romania, Ubaydi, Haqlaniyah, Hit, Baghdadi, Haditha, as well as numerous smaller villages - came under insurgent control.

== Hostage tactics ==
It is at this time during the war that kidnapping, and in some cases beheadings, emerged as another insurgent tactic. Foreign civilians bore the brunt of the kidnappings, although some U.S. military personnel were also targeted. After kidnapping the victim, the insurgents typically made some sort of demand of the government of the hostage's nation and gave a time limit for the demand to be carried out, often 72 hours. Beheading was often threatened if the government fails to heed the wishes of the hostage takers. Several individuals, including an American civilian (Nicholas Berg) and a South Korean (Kim Sun-il), among others, were beheaded during this period.

== Operations in May ==
On May 4, following a breakdown in negotiations, coalition forces began a counter-offensive to eliminate the Mahdi Army in southern Iraq. The first wave began with simultaneous raids in Karbala and Diwaniyah on militia forces. It was followed by a second wave on May 5 in Karbala, and more attacks which seized the governor's office in Najaf on May 6. Four U.S. soldiers and an estimated 86 militiamen were killed in the fighting. Several high-ranking militia commanders were also killed in a separate raid by US Army Special Operations units.

On May 8, U.S. forces launched a follow-up offensive into Karbala, launching a two-pronged attack into the city. U.S. tanks also launched an incursion into Sadr City. At the same time, perhaps as a diversionary tactic, hundreds of Mahdi Army insurgents swept through Basra, firing on British patrols and seizing parts of the city. Two militants were killed and several British troops were wounded.

On May 24, after suffering heavy losses in weeks of fighting, Mahdi Army forces withdrew from the city of Karbala. This left the Najaf-Kufa region the only area still under firm Mahdi control, though it was also under sustained American assault. Several hundred Mahdi Army rebels in total were killed in clashes with American forces. Unfazed by the fighting, Muqtada al-Sadr regularly gave Friday sermons in Kufa throughout the uprising.

On May 30, American forces withdrew from the interior of the city of Samarra, and encircled it. Insurgents took full control of the city. On the same day, insurgents also took control of Latifiya and Yusufiyah south of Baghdad, effectively cutting Highway One between Baghdad and Karbala, and the Americans responded by rerouting traffic onto Highway Eight to maintain contact with the south of the country.

== Close of operations ==
On June 6, 2004, Muqtada al-Sadr issued an announcement directing the Mahdi Army to cease operations in Najaf and Kufa, but the fighting in the south continued until June 24, 2004. Coincidentally, just as the Shi'a and Sunni offensives started together on the same day, they ended on the same day. On the day that the fighting ceased in the south, a massive coordinated attack by insurgents was underway in the Sunni territories. In five cities - Ramadi, Baghdad, Mahmudiya, Baquba and Mosul - attacks were underway. In Baghdad a suicide bomber killed four Iraqi soldiers, but the attacks in Mosul were the bloodiest. Four suicide bombers killed fifty-six civilians, eight Iraqi policemen and two American soldiers. The most intense fighting was in Baquba, where, with precise and strategic attack, the insurgents attacked and took control of the main police station and city hall, and burned down the home of the police chief. American and Iraqi troops withdrew from the city, but after a few hours American bomber planes hit insurgent positions in the city at city hall, the police station and at the football stadium. After the air strikes, the American forces entered the city without resistance. Twenty-one members of the Iraqi security forces, two American soldiers and thirteen civilians were killed during the street fighting in Baquba. The only gain by the insurgents on this day was in Ramadi, where insurgent forces managed to take control and laid siege to Marine bunker positions. The city was under insurgent control by the end of the day. Some additional fighting was also reported around Fallujah, where nine civilians were said to have been killed. During the insurgent offensive on June 24, 2004, one hundred twenty-nine Iraqis and four American soldiers were killed. The number of insurgent casualties is unknown.

== Aftermath ==
The United States estimated that around 1,342 Sunni and Shi'a fighters were killed, and approximately 430 insurgents were captured. 1st Armoured Division claimed to have killed an additional 7,000 insurgents, and captured 20 insurgents during Operation Iron Saber. The USA, Iraq, and other allied forces suffered 383 killed. Approximately 2,500 American soldiers were wounded during this period. The results were indecisive. Most of Al-Anbar province (including Ramadi and Fallujah) as well as some Sunni territory north and south of Baghdad, including Samarra, were effectively left under insurgent control. The United States forces managed to maintain control of Baghdad and other major cities in the Shi'a south as well as some in the north. Another uprising of the Mahdi Army occurred a month and a half later, and a bloodier battle for the city of Najaf unfolded. Also in November the Second Battle of Fallujah occurred, when US forces carried out Operation Phantom Fury, which left ninety-five percent of the city in ruins. Four days after the end of the Spring Fighting on June 28, 2004, the Coalition Provisional Authority transferred control to a new Iraqi government. With this, the occupation was officially over, but coalition forces remained in large numbers in the country. On the day that the transfer of authority occurred, three American Marines were killed in Baghdad and one British soldier was killed in Basra.

== See also ==
- The Long Road Home (miniseries) depicting the Sadr City attack, based on a 2007 book
