= Operation Sinbad =

2006 military operation in Iraq

- Part of the Iraq War, Iraqi insurgency, and the Iraqi civil war
Date	27 September 2006 – 18 February 2007 (4 months, 3 weeks and 1 day)
Location	Basra, Iraq

Belligerents
(United Kingdom) UK (Iraq) New Iraqi Army; Denmark	Mahdi Army

Strength
5,300	Unknown

Casualties and losses
(United Kingdom) 11 killed 27 wounded (Iraq) 17 killed (Denmark) 1 killed	12+ killed 29 captured (Confirmed Losses - More Unconfirmed)

Operation Sinbad was an operation led by the Iraqi Security Forces and supported by British, Danish and other Multi-National Forces in southern Iraq. The operation began during the early hours of 27 September 2006. The stated goal of the operation was to root out corrupt police as well as offer assistance to the residents of the area in rebuilding. An estimated 2,300 Iraqi army troops and 1,000 British soldiers took part in the operations with another 2,000 in close proximity, in preparation for handing over security of the city of Basra to the Iraqi government.

== Rebuilding ==
The rebuilding portion of the project was primarily carried out by Iraqi engineers with "low level immediate impact projects" such as school repairs and basic infrastructure such as foot bridges. Other basic tasks include street cleaning and fixing of street lights, fixing power cables and improving water systems. Midterm programs include hospital repairs and renovation as well as distribution of educational materials. Long term civil programs include the restoration of the local farm plantations.

== Military aspect ==
The military aspect was to remove, to root out the corruption that plagued the Iraqi police as Shi'ite militias began infiltrating them. Forces consisting of "transition teams" of Royal Military Police were planned to be inserted into local police stations looking for those "unable or unwilling to perform their duties", the teams to operate in each station for up to 30 days. Although comparisons have been made with the U.S. and Iraqi security drive in Baghdad named "Operation Together Forward", where the militias are first removed and then civil affairs projects follow, the problems in Basra were significantly different; with an almost wholly Shia population, the sectarian violence and Sunni insurgency seen in Baghdad are not major issues, but criminality and factional in-fighting were.

During the operation there were numerous insurgent attacks on the British and other coalition forces that resulted in casualties.

== Timeline ==
While the operation was ongoing, a bus carrying seventeen police trainers was stopped near Basra on 29 October, and all of the occupants kidnapped. All seventeen were found executed four hours later. A police chief from the Serious Crime Unit was arrested on 22 December, along with six other officers. It is thought that he led the death squad responsible for the killing of the trainers.

On 25 December 2006 British forces backed up by the Iraqi army attacked the headquarters of the Serious Crime Unit in Basra after intelligence was received that corrupt police officers were preparing to execute all 127 prisoners kept there. The British destroyed the building killing seven gunmen. All of the prisoners were rescued, some reportedly showing signs of torture.

On 28 January 2007, acting on intelligence, British soldiers conducted dawn raids in Az Zubayr, near Basra. Ammunition, light rockets, bomb-making paraphernalia, radio equipment and timer units were discovered at a house. Around 500 mortar rounds were later seized from a compound where troops had earlier spotted men transferring weapons into two vehicles. Up to five militants were captured.

On 18 February 2007, the operation ended, and almost immediately British prime minister Tony Blair stated in a televised address that in the coming months 3,000 of the more than 7,000 British troops will be withdrawn from Iraq. By July 1,500 troops were withdrawn but the new British prime minister Gordon Brown stated that no more troops would be coming out of Iraq, saying that if any more troops would withdraw the remaining soldiers would not be able to defend themselves.

== See also ==
- Iraq War
- Iraqi insurgency
- Operation Together Forward
