= Camp Doha =

U.S. Army base in Kuwait

Coordinates: 29°22′04″N 47°48′14″E

- Kuwait
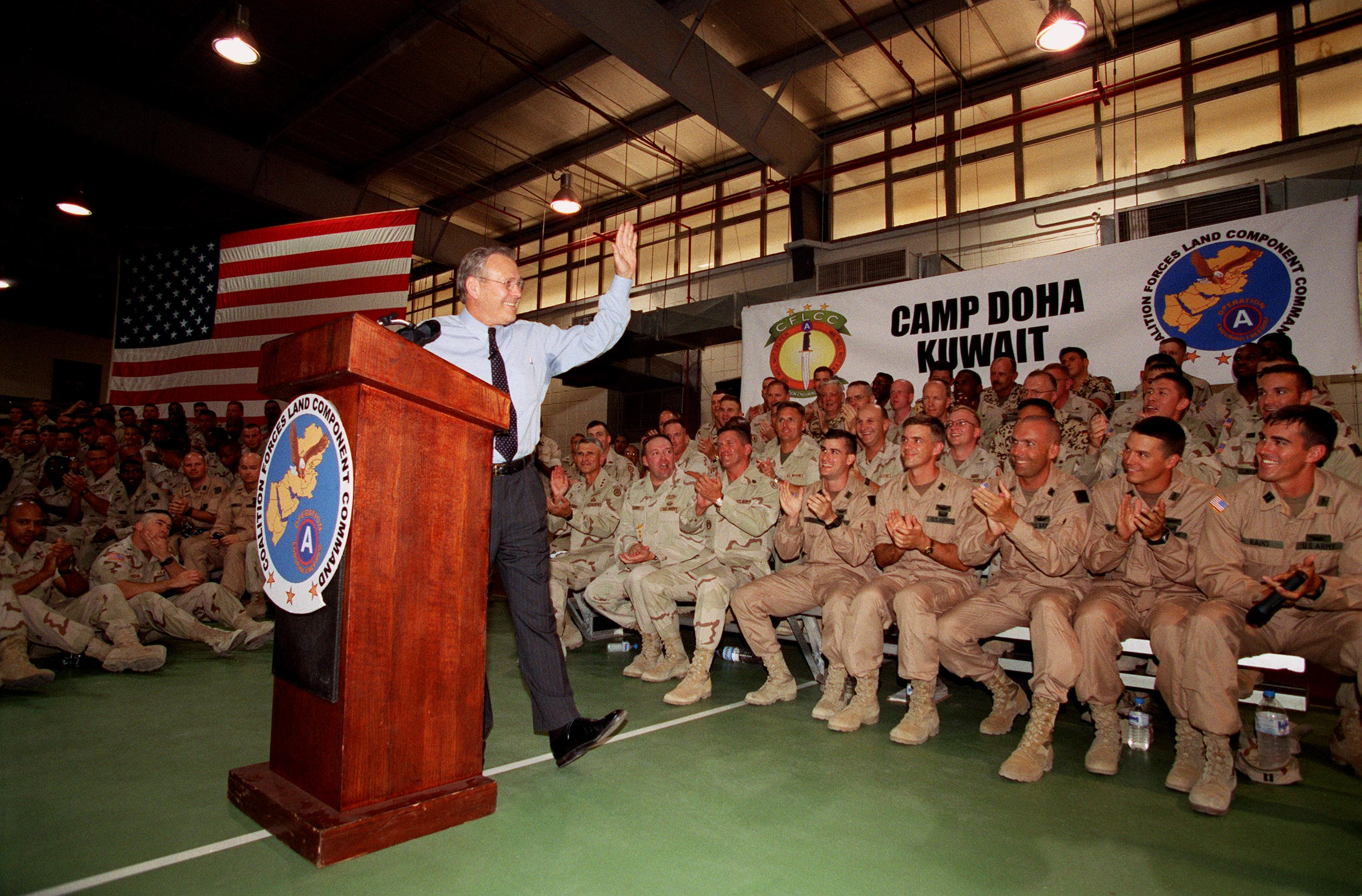
- Secretary of Defense Donald H. Rumsfeld visiting Camp Doha in 2002

Site information
- Type: U.S. Army base

Site history
- Built: 1991
- Events: Gulf War; 2003 invasion of Iraq; Operation Desert Thunder

Camp Doha was the main U.S. Army base in Kuwait, and played a pivotal role in the U.S. military presence in the Middle East since the 1991 Gulf War and in the 2003 invasion of Iraq. The complex is located on a small peninsula on Kuwait Bay, west of Kuwait City. It was initially a large industrial warehouse complex and was taken in hand by the U.S. Army for conversion to its current role in 1998 during Operation Desert Thunder.

== History of Camp Doha ==
Camp Doha housed both Army Forces Central Command-Kuwait (ARCENT-Kuwait) and Coalition/Joint Task Force-Kuwait (Forward) (C/JTF-KU (Fwd)), making it effectively a nerve center not only for U.S. operations in Iraq, but throughout the Middle East. Camp Doha was used as a major transit point for NATO and United States military personnel while en route to Afghanistan. At its peak, over 2,000 military and civilian personnel were stationed there, with several thousand additional personnel in transit at any given point. In April 2005, the Army announced the closure of the base, saying that the personnel from Camp Doha would be divided between Camp Buehring and Camp Arifjan. The base was formally closed in 2006.

=== North Compound munitions explosion and fire ===
At approximately 10:20 A.M. on July 11, 1991, a defective heater in an M992 ammunition carrier loaded with 155 mm artillery shells caught on fire. Servicemembers unsuccessfully tried to extinguish the fire before being ordered to evacuate the North Compound. This evacuation was still under way when the burning M992 exploded at 11:00 AM, scattering artillery submunitions (bomblets) over nearby combat-loaded vehicles and ammunition stocks. This set off an hours-long series of explosions and fires that devastated the vehicles and equipment in the North Compound and scattered unexploded ordnance and debris over much of the remainder of the camp. The fires produced billowing black and white clouds of smoke that rose hundreds of feet into the air and drifted to the east-southeast, across portions of both the North and South Compounds, in the direction of Kuwait City.

The fires died down enough by mid-afternoon to allow a preliminary damage assessment. There were no fatalities; however, 49 US soldiers were injured, 2 seriously. Most of the injuries were fractures, sprains, contusions, or lacerations suffered when soldiers scrambled over the 15-foot high perimeter wall to escape the North Compound. In addition, four British soldiers received minor injuries.

The fire and explosions damaged or destroyed 102 vehicles, including 4 M1A1 tanks and numerous other combat vehicles. More than two dozen buildings sustained damage as well. Among the estimated almost $15 million in damaged or destroyed ammunition were 660 M829 120mm depleted uranium sabot rounds.

Three members of an Explosive Ordnance Disposal team were killed on July 23, 1991 during clean-up operations. Explosive Ordnance Disposal Specialists, Sergeant First Class Donald T. Murphy Jr., Staff Sergeant Ricky L. Bunch, and Combat Engineer, Private First Class Joshua J. Fleming, were killed during an accidental detonation of unexploded ordnance. The Explosive Ordnance Disposal team had transported cleared unexploded ammunition from the accident site by utilizing an M113 armored personnel carrier (APC) towing a trailer to the disposal site 200 meters from Camp Doha. The Explosive Ordnance Disposal team was planning to unload the ordnance into the pit. The M113 was located adjacent to a pit. One Explosive Ordnance Disposal tech was in the pit and another was at the rear of the trailer. One round (unknown type) was being transferred from the trailer when it detonated.

=== 2026 U.S./Iran Conflict ===
On July 23rd, 2026, the Iranian Revolutionary Guard Corps claimed to have struck "ammunition and logistical supply depots" at Camp Doha as part of the conflict between the U.S. and Iran.

== See also ==
- List of United Kingdom Military installations used during Operation Telic
