= Operation Desert Scorpion =

Wikimedia disambiguation page

- Part of The Iraq War
Date	15 June 2003 – 29 June 2003
Location	North-Central Iraq
Result	US operational failure: Efforts to suppress growing insurgency ineffective.

Belligerents
United States	Iraqi Insurgents

Casualties and losses
52	1,330 detained
- None reported on either side

Operation Desert Scorpion was a major U.S. operation to identify and eliminate anti-coalition forces while simultaneously delivering humanitarian aid. The area of operation was mainly in north-central Iraq and was conducted between 15 and 29 June 2003. The stated task and purpose of Operation Desert Scorpion was to defeat remaining enemy non-compliant forces. It was planned as a major operation supporting the first "post-hostilities" campaign plan which had been issued just a week prior to its inception.

== Background ==
The operation followed Operation Peninsula Strike, which had ended three days earlier, and was part of a U.S response to a major spike in attacks by anti-coalition forces that began in late May 2003. Operation Peninsula Strike was a 4th Infantry Division operation and was directly influenced by earlier warning orders of Operation Desert Scorpion. This operation was supported from Camp Spearhead Kuwait, by the 149th Transportation Company (POCC), 10th Transportation BN (TML), 7th Transportation GRP (COMP).

== The operation ==
Combined Joint Task Force 7 conducted the operation that included elements from the 3rd Infantry Division, the 4th Infantry Division, the 101st Airborne Division, 1st Armored Division, the 2nd Armored Cavalry Regiment and the 3rd Armored Cavalry Regiment. The scheme of maneuver was first to gain intelligence to identify those elements, or forces, in Iraq that were preventing the establishment of interim governing capability. Simultaneously, the operation was to identify those elements who were supporting governance and stability in Iraq, and identify public works projects that would enable their efforts. The operation was designed to commence with country wide operations that defeated those remaining non – compliant forces while simultaneously providing funds and projects to those areas, and local leaders, who supported the growth of Iraqi governance and stability.

The 3rd Infantry Division conducted five raids and detained 20. The 3ID also seized 20 anti-tank rounds, three AK-47s, one Rocket propelled grenade and some C4 explosives along with detonators. The 3ID's humanitarian contributions to the operation included coordinating a trash collection service and removing 64 loads of trash from Fallujah and continued to work with the municipality to re-establish a waste collection system.

The 4th Infantry Division conducted 43 raids in an area ranging from Kirkuk in the north to Taji in the south and initially detained 288 individuals. Sixty-five of the detained were held. The unit seized three AK-47s, one mortar site and one Dragunov night sight. The division also placed a contract for playground equipment and a retaining wall for a school in their area, assisted a general hospital with $1,000 drug and supply purchase and purchased an ambulance.

Soldiers from the 101st Airborne Division conducted three raids and detained 12 individuals. The 101st Airborne Division also worked to rebuild drainage ditches and renovating the mayor's office in Makhmur, along with rebuilding at kindergarten schools.

The 1st Armored Division executed offensive actions in Baghdad conducting six raids and detaining 22 individuals. The unit seized nine rifles, eight pistols, three knives, two boxes of grenades, one bomb and three 127mm rounds.

The 3d Armored Cavalry Regiment conducted 11 raids and detained 39 individuals. It also passed out school supplies to the local schools in the eastern part of Iraq.

== Aftermath ==
During the raids, two former Iraqi generals turned themselves in, Maj. Gen. Abdul Ali Jasmin, secretary of the Defense Ministry, and Brig. Gen. Abdullah Ali Jasmin, head of the Iraqi Military Academy and were detained for questioning. Operation Desert Scorpion also resulted in the seizure of eight million Dollars as well as a large sum of British pounds and Euros.

In addition to the 1,330 suspects being detained, 497 AK-47s, 235 hand grenades, 124 RPGs, 22 belt-fed machine guns, 130 pistols, 100 rifles, 8,122 rounds and ammunition were also seized.

Unfortunately, the operation did not achieve the desired effects. It was hampered initially by a failure to provide for the public works projects so critical to its success. While the Divisions' submitted a total of approximately $53 million in requirements, only some $20 million were funded. Thus, the force did not achieve its aim to publicly demonstrate commitment to rewarding those who supported stability in Iraq. As well, the force did not allow time to develop the intelligence required to find, target and then attack the leaders of local insurgent movements. However, the legacy of Operation Desert Scorpion is still seen today in operations in both Iraq and Afghanistan. It has become a pattern for operations in both theaters.

== Military units involved ==
US forces reported to be involved were

- 3rd Infantry Division
- 4th Infantry Division
- 101st Airborne Division
- 1st Armored Division
- 2d Armored Cavalry Regiment
- 3d Armored Cavalry Regiment
- 149th Transportation Company
- 671st Eng Co
- 211th MP BN/115th MP Company
