= Operation Peninsula Strike =

June 2003 counterinsurgency operation during the Iraq War

- Part of The war on terrorism, Iraq War
| Date | 9 June 2003 – 13 June 2003 |
| Location | Balad, Iraq |
| Result | Capture of Ba'ath Party Officials; failure to suppress early insurgency |

Belligerents
| United States | Iraqi Insurgents |

Commanders and leaders
| | Unknown |

Casualties and losses
| 4 wounded | 27 Killed 320–397 captured |
- None Reported

Operation Peninsula Strike was a series of raids conducted by American troops from 9 to 13 June 2003 as part of Operation Iraqi Freedom, carried out by members of Task Force Ironhorse on a peninsula alongside the Tigris River near Balad, Iraq. In the operation US forces sought to target members of the Ba'ath Party, paramilitary, and subversive units. Specifically, US Forces were to hit five objectives simultaneously, detain the targets and screen them for intelligence.

== The operation ==
Attacking from helicopters, small boats and in armored vehicles, American forces set up road blocks and began a large raid with a force of over 1,000 soldiers, who quickly captured 397 suspects. Among those who were targeted for capture were two persons on the 'Most Wanted List': Major General Abul Ali Jasmin, the former Minister of Defense, and Brigadier General Abdullah Ali Jasmin, former head of the military academy. However, none of the targets were at the locations attacked. Of the 397 initially detained, most were released within days of the operation.

On the last day of the operation, a force of Iraqi insurgents attacked a patrol from the 4th Infantry Division, which was involved in the operation. The insurgents fired rocket-propelled grenades at the 4th Infantry Division tank patrol. The tanks returned fire, killing four attackers and forcing the others to flee. Later, backed by Apache helicopters, the U.S. forces pursued the remaining attackers, killing another 23.

Numerous weapons caches were seized.

== Units involved ==
Included elements of the:

- 3d Brigade, U.S. 4th Infantry Division
- 173d Airborne Brigade
- 3d Squadron, U.S. 7th Cavalry Regiment, 3d Infantry Division
- 1st Battalion, U.S. 8th Infantry Regiment
- 720th Military Police Battalion
- 57th Aviation Battalion
- 159th Aviation Battalion
- 2d Battalion, 503d Infantry Regiment
- elements from 104th Military Intelligence Battalion, U.S. 4th Infantry Division
- elements from 519th Military Intelligence Battalion
- 3rd Brigade 1st Armored Division. 1-13th tank

== See also ==
Operation Peninsula Strike followed Operation Planet X and preceded Operation Desert Scorpion.
