= Operation Lion's Leap =

- Part of the Iraq War, Post-invasion Iraq
Date	17 November 2007 – 18 December 2011
Location	Diwaniya, Iraq
Result	Indecisive

Belligerents
United States; United Kingdom; Poland; Iraq	Mahdi Army

Strength
At least 2 Iraqi army brigades One US brigade	Unknown

Casualties and losses
	74 captured.

Operation Lion's Leap was a joint US-Iraqi operation against the Mahdi Army in Diwaniyah, 180 kilometers south of Baghdad. The division-level operation was launched on 17 November 2007 by Iraqi Army and police forces, with a US brigade in support. At least 74 Mahdi Army militiamen were captured and at least two major weapons caches were discovered.

== Background ==
Diwaniyah served as a hub of Mahdi Army activity throughout most of 2007, during which U.S and Iraqi security forces conducted numerous raids and operations against elements of the militia and the Special Groups across the Southern city.In April, U.S. and Iraqi forces launched Operation Black Eagle in the city. Dozens of Mahdi fighters were killed or captured in the operation.

On 31 October, ten Sadrists were captured just south of Diwaniyah. On 11 November, a key Sadrist leader was captured inside the city. The weekend before the operation, an Iraqi court sentenced 17 Sadrists to death for attacks on Iraqi security forces.

== The operation ==
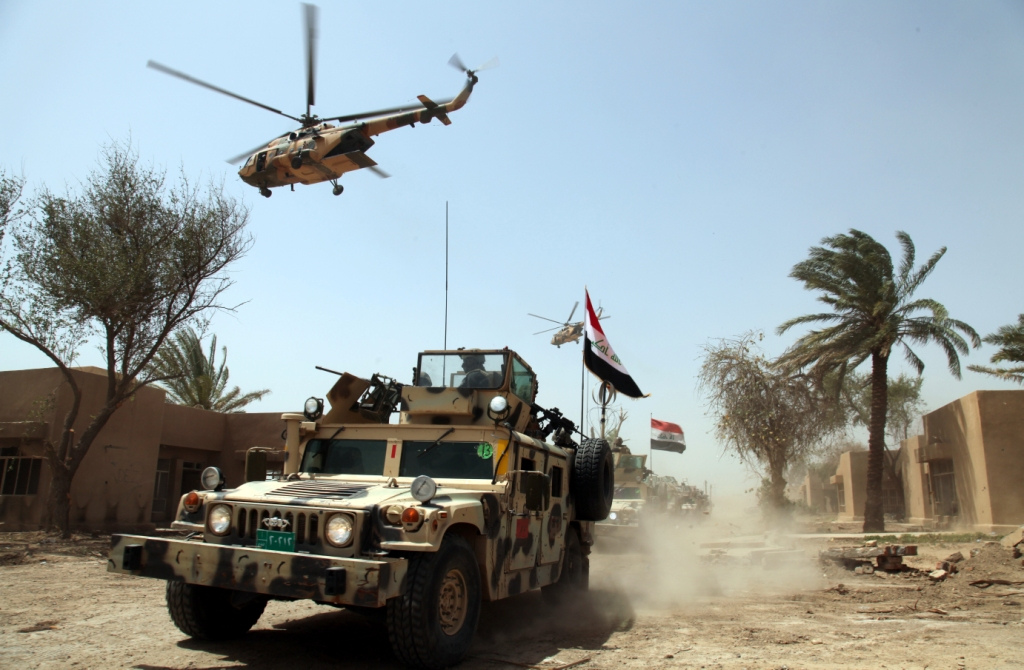
Members of Iraqi Special Operations Forces (ISOF) participate in Operation Lion's Leap on 26 April 2011

12 suspects were arrested by Iraqi national police forces and the al-Baqer emergency brigade during the first hours of the operation.

On 19 November, a senior general with the 8th Division (Iraq) of the Iraqi Army reported Iranian-made weapons were among a large cache of arms and ammunition found during the operation. "There are seven Iranian-made roadside bombs and nine anti-tank mines," said Major General Jamil Kamel al Shimari, a senior officer in the 8th Iraqi Army Division. "These are a big danger threatening our forces."

Sadr's office in the town of Nafar, south of Diwaniyah, was raided as part of the crackdown, Hussain al-Buderi, a member of the Qadisiyah provincial council Mr Buderi said. 49 militants were arrested, including 4 leaders.

Diwaniyah's police chief, Major General Ali Akmoosh, said the assault also led to the dismissal of 70 policemen, including some officers, for supporting "armed gangs".

== See also ==
- Battle of Diwaniya
- Operation Black Eagle
