= Operation Black Eagle =

Military operation in Iraq in 2007

Coordinates: 31.9833°N 44.9333°E

- Part of the Iraq War, Post-invasion Iraq
Date	6–10 April 2007
Location	Al Diwaniyah, Iraq
Result	Indecisive

Belligerents
United States; United Kingdom; Poland (Iraq) Iraqi Security Forces	Mahdi Army

Commanders and leaders
Khalid Hassan †	Muqtada al-Sadr

Casualties and losses
(United States) 6 killed (Poland) 1 killed (Iraq) 29 killed	25 killed 39 captured

Operation Black Eagle is an operation that took place during Operation Iraqi Freedom from 2003 to 2010. It was the 381st listed operation during the Iraq war in 2003 Black Eagle was an operation in which U.S., Polish, and Iraqi troops battled gunmen loyal to anti-American cleric Muqtada al-Sadr in the town of Al Diwaniyah, which is the capital of Iraq's Al-Qādisiyyah Governorate, for control of the city. U.S. warplanes targeted insurgent positions with Hellfire missiles in and near the city. As of 7 April 2007, Iraqi officials have verified six insurgents killed and 39 captured. On 10 April 2007, combat operations had been declared to have ended and the operation continued into the reconstruction phase. There is no relation to Operation Black Eagle II that took place in January 2007.

== Overview ==
Operation Black Eagle took place in the city of Al Diwaniyah. This city is the capital of Al-Qādisiyyah Governorate. The population of it was estimated to be around 300,000 people. It is currently the 14th most populated city in all of Iraq. It was the location of an insurgent uprise that was to be neutralized. Operation Black Eagle's intention was to disrupt militia activities that were being armed with illegal weapons. It was in response to violence in the area that threatened to destabilize the region. At 6:30 AM, forces began to enter the city and start their mission. They were able to detain 39 militia personnel. On Day 2, they were able to seize an unspecified number of weapon caches. The caches included 27 90mm rockets, six claymore mines, five crates of C-4 explosives, eight explosively formed projectiles, four EFP cones and other EFP-making materials, one roll of detonation cord, 14 hand grenades, 12 blasting caps for explosives, six rolls of copper wire, one global positioning system, 13 fully loaded AK-47 ammunition magazines, 900 PKC machine gun ammunition rounds, two PKC machine gun barrels, one PKC machine gun butt stock, one mortar system sight, and five ballistic vests. On 10 April, the final day of the operation, citizens in the city were to be given more unrestricted movement and the cordon around the city would be opened up for them.

== Participants ==
4 countries were a part of the conflict in Al Diwaniyah. The United Kingdom was not heavily involved in this operation. Polish forces helped slightly and one Polish soldier was KIA. American forces included 1st squadron 14th Cavalry Regiment of 3rd brigade, 2nd infantry division and the 0800 Military Transition Team. These Teams took charge of the operation and with the help of the 8th Iraqi Special Forces division and the Multi-National Division-Baghdad, saw to its completion. The 8th Iraqi Special Forces unit was voted as one of the best Iraqi units. The group that opposed those forces were the Mahdi Army, an army of revolutionary Shi'ite Muslims. The American forces had 6 soldiers die, while the Iraqi Special Forces had 29 soldiers killed. On the other side, the Mahdi Army had 25 of its members killed and 39 insurgents were captured.

== Aftermath ==
Immediately after the conclusion of the operation, the city felt much more regulated. Those that were members of the militia were no longer in the city, as they were detained or were killed. Insurgents tended to use car bombs as a way to assault American or Iraqi forces. The seizure of some of those bombs and explosive devices were instrumental in thwarting the incoming attacks. In mid-May however, heavy fighting erupted in the city.

On 11 August 2007, a roadside bomb hit the convoy of the governor of Diwaniya, Khalil Jalil Hamza, killing him along with the province's police chief Brigadier Khalid Hassan.

== See also ==
- Operation Lion's Leap

List of coalition military operations of the Iraq War
