= Mahdi Army =

Shia Iraqi jihadist militia (2003–2008)

- جيش المهدي
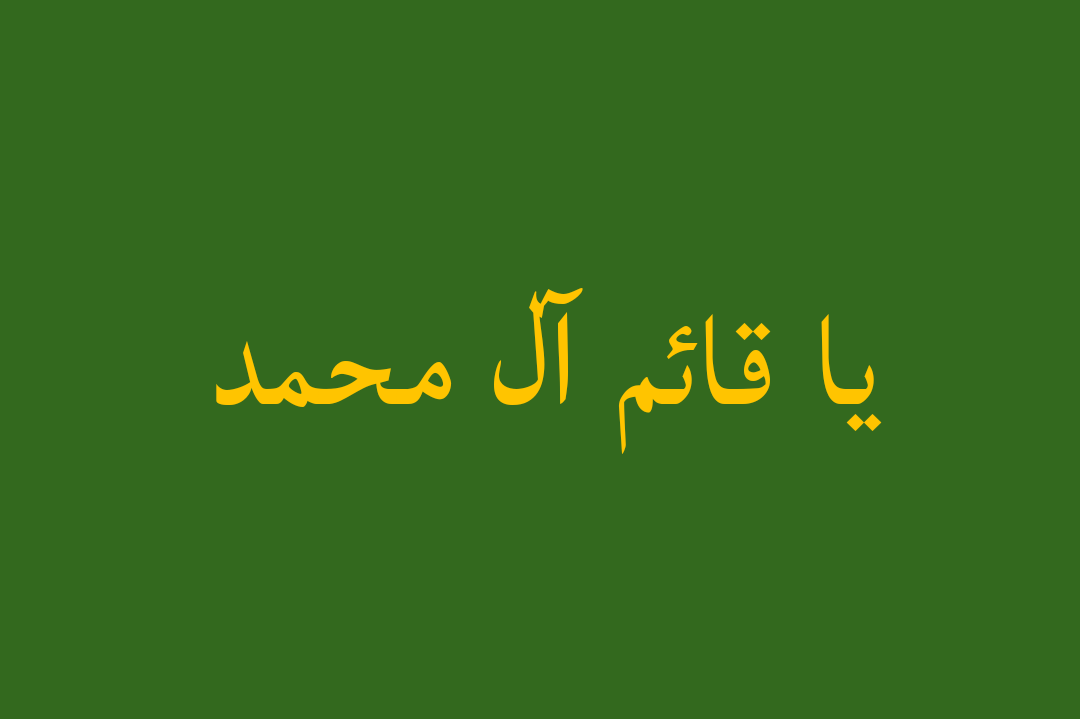
- Flags used by the Mahdi Army.
- Leader: Muqtada al-Sadr
- Dates active: June 2003 – August 2008
- Headquarters: Najaf, Kufa, Sadr City
- Active regions: Iraq: Najaf; Karbala; Baghdad; Basra; Nasiriyah; Kufa; Amarah
- Ideology: Iraqi nationalism Sadrist Thought; Anti-Wahhabism; Shia Islamism; Shia Jihad; Anti-Coalition; Anti-Americanism; Anti-LGBT; Anti-Zionism; Antisemitism; Factions: Anti-Sunnism
- Political position: Right-wing
- Status: Dissolved (the name was still used to refer to successor Sadr led militias including the Promised Day Brigade and Saraya al-Salam)
- Size: 60,000 (2008)
- Part of: Sadrist Movement; Special Groups (Iraq) (2007-2008)
- Wars: the Iraq War, Iraqi civil war

The Mahdi Army (Arabic: جيش المهدي) was a Shia Iraqi militia founded by Muqtada al-Sadr in 2003 following the American invasion of Iraq. Its stated purpose was to resist the American occupation, protect Shiite areas, holy shrines, including the Imam Ali Shrine, and provide security and services. The Army became known for its fierce battles against coalition forces, most notably in Najaf, Sadr City, Basra, and Dhi Qar in 2004.

The Mahdi Army rose to international prominence on April 4, 2004, when it spearheaded the first major armed confrontation against the US forces in Iraq from the Shia community. This concerned an uprising that followed the ban of al-Sadr's newspaper and his subsequent attempted arrest, lasting until a truce on June 6. The truce was followed by moves to disband the group and transform al-Sadr's movement into a political party to take part in the 2005 elections; Muqtada al-Sadr ordered fighters of the Mahdi Army to cease fire unless attacked first. The truce broke down in August 2004 after provocative actions by the Mahdi Army, with new hostilities erupting. The group was disbanded in 2008, following a crackdown by Iraqi security forces.

At its height, the Mahdi Army's popularity was strong enough to influence local government, the police, and cooperation with Sunni Iraqis and their supporters. The group was popular among Iraqi Police forces. The National Independent Cadres and Elites party that ran in the 2005 Iraqi election was closely linked with the Army. The Mahdi Army was accused of operating death squads.

The group was armed with various light weapons, including improvised explosive devices (IEDs). Many of the IEDs used during attacks on Iraqi security forces and Coalition forces used infrared sensors as triggers, a technique that was used widely by the IRA in Northern Ireland in the early-to-mid-1990s during the Troubles.

The group was semi-revived in 2014 as Saraya al-Salam in order to fight against the Islamic State of Iraq and the Levant and was still active as of 2016. It participated in the recapture of Jurf Al Nasr and the Second Battle of Tikrit.

== Nomenclature ==
In the Twelver school of Shia Islam, the Mahdī is believed to have been a historical figure identified with the Twelfth Imam, Hujjat Allah al-Mahdi, and is therefore called al-Imām al-Mahdī. It is believed that he is still present on earth in occultation, and will emerge again in the end times. Those Shias of this school believe that Imam Mahdi is the rightful ruler of the Islamic community (Ummah) at any given time, and he is therefore also called Imām al-Zamān, meaning "Imam of the Era".

== History ==
=== Early history ===
Created by Muqtada al-Sadr and a small fraction of Shias, the Mahdi Army began as a group of roughly 500 seminary students connected with Muqtada al-Sadr in the Sadr City district of Baghdad, formerly known as Saddam City. The group moved in to fill the security vacuum in Sadr City and in a string of southern Iraqi cities following the fall of Baghdad to U.S.-led coalition forces on April 9, 2003. The group was involved in dispensing aid to Iraqis and provided security in the Shi'ite slums from looters.

Gradually, the militia grew and al-Sadr formalized it in June 2003. The Mahdi Army grew into a sizable force of up to 10,000 who even operated what amounted to a shadow government in some areas. Al-Sadr's preaching is critical of the American occupation, but he did not initially join the Sunni Islamist and Ba'athist guerrillas in their attacks on coalition forces. Iranian Quds Force commander Qasem Soleimani played a significant role in the establishment of Mahdi Army as soon as the Iraq War broke out in 2003.

=== 2004 Shia uprising ===
==== Uprising begins ====
Sadr's position changed dramatically, however, by the beginning of April 2004. Following the closure of the Sadr-owned newspaper al-Hawza and the arrest of one of his senior aides, Sadr gave an unusually heated sermon to his followers on April 2. The next day, violent protests occurred throughout the Shi'ite south that soon spilt over into a violent uprising by Mahdi Army militiamen, fully underway by April 4.

==== April hostilities ====
The Mahdi Army forces began an offensive in Najaf, Kufa, Kut, and Sadr City, seizing control of public buildings and police stations while clashing with coalition forces. The militants gained partial control of Karbala after fighting there. Other coalition forces came under attack in Nasiriyah, Amarah and Basra. Najaf and Kufa were quickly seized after a few firefights with Spanish troops, and Kut has seized after clashes with Ukrainian troops soon afterwards.

After sporadic clashes, coalition forces temporarily suppressed most militia activity in Nasiriyah, Amarah, and Basra. Mahdi rebels expelled Iraqi police from three police stations and ambushed U.S. forces in Sadr City, killing seven U.S. troops and wounding several more. U.S. forces subsequently regained control of the police stations after running firefights with the fighters, killing dozens of Mahdi militiamen. However, Mahdi Army members still maintained some influence over many of the slum areas of Sadr City.

On April 16, Kut was retaken by US forces, and several dozen Mahdi Army members were killed in the battle. However, the area around Najaf and Kufa along with Karbala remained under the control of Sadr's forces. Sadr himself was believed to be in Najaf. Coalition troops cordoned off Najaf with 2,500 troops but reduced the number of forces to pursue negotiations with the Mahdi Army. At the beginning of May, coalition forces estimated that there were 200–500 militants still present in Karbala, 300–400 in Diwaniyah, an unknown number still left in Amarah and Basra, and 1,000–2,000 still in the Najaf-Kufa region.

On May 4, coalition forces began a counter-offensive to eliminate the Mahdi Army in southern Iraq following a breakdown in negotiations. The first wave began with simultaneous raids in Karbala and Diwaniyah on militia forces, followed by a second wave on May 5 in Karbala and more attacks that seized the governor's office in Najaf on May 6. 86 militiamen were estimated killed in the fighting along with 4 U.S. soldiers. Several high-ranking militia commanders were also killed in a separate raid by US Special Operations units. On May 8, U.S. forces launched a follow-up offensive into Karbala, launching a two-pronged attack into the city. U.S. tanks also launched an incursion into Sadr City. At the same time, perhaps as a diversionary tactic, hundreds of Mahdi Army members swept through Basra, firing on British patrols and seizing parts of the city. Two militants were killed and several British troops were wounded.

On May 24, after suffering heavy losses in weeks of fighting, Mahdi Army forces withdrew from the city of Karbala. This left the only area still under their firm control being the Najaf-Kufa region, also under sustained American assault. Several hundred Mahdi Army militia in total were killed. Unfazed by the fighting, Muqtada al-Sadr regularly gave Friday sermons in Kufa throughout the uprising.

==== June truce ====
On June 6, 2004, Muqtada al-Sadr issued an announcement directing the Mahdi Army to cease operations in Najaf and Kufa. Remnants of the militia soon ceased bearing arms and halted the attacks on U.S. forces. Gradually, militiamen left the area or went back to their homes. On the same day, Brigadier General Mark Hertling, a top US commander in charge of Najaf, Iraq, stated "The Muqtada militia is militarily defeated. We have killed scores of them over the last few weeks, and that is in Najaf alone. [...] The militia have been defeated, or have left." June 6 effectively marked the end of Shi'ite uprising. The total number of Mahdi Army militiamen killed in the fighting across Iraq is estimated at between 1,500 and 2,000.

The return of Najaf to Iraqi security forces following the cease-fire left Sadr City as the last bastion of Mahdi Army guerrillas still pursuing violent resistance. Clashes continued periodically in the district following the end of the Najaf-Kufa battles. On June 24, Mahdi Army declared an end to operations in Sadr City as well, effectively ending militia activity, at least for the time being.

After the June 4 truce with the occupation forces, al-Sadr took steps to disband the Mahdi Army. In a statement, he called on militia members from outside Najaf to "do their duty" and go home. US forces in Najaf were then replaced by Iraqi police. Al-Sadr told supporters not to attack Iraqi security forces and announced his intention to form a party and enter the 2005 elections. He said the interim government was an opportunity to build a unified Iraq. Interim President Ghazi Yawer gave assurances that al-Sadr could join the political process provided he abandoned his militia. Iraqi officials also assured al-Sadr that he was not to face arrest.

==== August hostilities ====
After Sadr's militia besieged a police station in Najaf and the local governor called for assistance, the US military intervened again. US troops arrested Sadr's representative in Karbala, Sheikh Mithal al Hasnawi on July 31 and surrounded al-Sadr's home on August 3. British troops in Basra also moved against al-Sadr followers, arresting four on August 3. After the expiration of a noon deadline to release them on August 5, the Basra militiamen declared holy war on British forces.

On August 5, via his spokesman Ahmed al-Shaibany, al-Sadr re-affirmed his commitment to the truce and called on US forces to honour the truce. He announced that if the restoration of the cease-fire failed "then the firing and igniting of the revolution will continue". The offer was rejected by the governor of Najaf, Adnan al-Zurufi ("There is no compromise or room for another truce") and US officials ("This is one battle we really do feel we can win").

In the days that followed fighting continued around the old city of Najaf, in particular at the Imam Ali shrine and the cemetery. The Mahdi Army, estimated at 2,000 in Najaf, was outnumbered by some 2,000 US troops and 1,800 Iraqi security forces, and at a disadvantage due to the vastly superior American tactics, training, firepower and airpower, such as helicopters and AC-130 gunships. On August 13, the militia was trapped in a cordon around the Imam Ali shrine. While negotiations continued between the interim government and the Mahdi Army, news came that al-Sadr had been wounded.

On August 12, British journalist James Brandon, a reporter for the Sunday Telegraph was kidnapped in Basra by unidentified militants. A videotape was released, featuring Brandon and a hooded militant, threatening to kill the British hostage unless US forces withdrew from Najaf within 24 hours. In a feature, Brandon describes being beaten, pistol-whipped, and forced to participate in mock executions. He said he escaped after holding a woman at knife-point, to a government building where guards found him, but they phoned his kidnappers, who arrived to collect him. Despite telling them repeatedly that he was a journalist, they assumed he was a spy or agent for the occupation until they saw a report about the kidnap on al-Arabiya television. Afterwards, Brandon's treatment improved markedly and he was released after less than a day, following intervention by al-Sadr. At a press conference, Brandon commented on his treatment and thanked his kidnappers: "Initially I was treated roughly, but once they knew I was a journalist I was treated very well and I want to say thank you to the people who kidnapped me." A spokesman for al-Sadr said: "We apologise for what happened to you. This is not our tradition, not our rules. It is not the tradition of Islam." Brandon was delivered to the British military police who gave him medical treatment and escorted him to Kuwait the following day. Brandon planned to see his family and go on holiday but said he wanted to return to Iraq : "Only next time, I just want to do the reporting. I have no desire to be the story again."

The fact that American troops surrounded the Shrine led to an impasse as the Mahdi army could not leave the shrine and US troops did not want to offend Islam by setting foot inside the shrine. The standoff did not end for three weeks until Sistani emerged from convalescence in London and brokered an agreement between the two forces.

==== Iraqi reactions ====
The uprising seemed to draw an ambivalent reaction from the Iraqi population, which for the most part neither joined nor resisted the rebels. Many Iraqi security forces melted away, wishing to avoid confrontation. In a sign of Mahdi Army's unpopularity in Najaf, however, which follows more traditionalist clerics, a small covert movement sprung up to launch attacks on the militants. The uprising did receive a good deal of support from Shiite radicals in Baghdad, however, who were galvanized by the simultaneous siege of the city of Fallujah.

=== 2005 ===
Loyalists to al-Sadr ran under the National Independent Cadres and Elites banner in the 2005 Iraqi election. Although al-Sadr himself had not endorsed the election, some of his supporters participated in it independently, while others joined the electoral process through the United Iraqi Alliance. A number of the movement's supporters considered the election illegitimate because it was held under the American-led occupation. The National Independent Elites and Cadres Party received 69,938 votes, approximately 0.83% of the national vote, winning three seats in the Transitional National Assembly. Another twenty or so candidates aligned with al-Sadr ran on the United Iraqi Alliance list.

Following the election, al-Sadr's supporters began consolidating their parliamentary influence. In March 2005, approximately two dozen legislators aligned with the cleric formed an independent parliamentary bloc, seeking to coordinate their political activities and increase their influence. In March 2005, approximately two dozen legislators aligned with the cleric formed an independent parliamentary bloc, seeking to coordinate their political activities and increase their influence within the transitional legislature. Despite their participation in the political process, the Sadrist movement continued to oppose the American military presence in Iraq and called for a timetable for the withdrawal of foreign forces.

Throughout 2005, the Mahdi Army remained an influential armed organization, particularly in Baghdad and southern Iraq. Its influence expanded alongside the Sadrist movement's political activities, with the militia maintaining a presence in predominantly Shiite communities. The relationship between the movement and the Iraqi security institutions also became a growing source of concern, as allegations emerged that members and sympathizers of the Mahdi Army had infiltrated elements of the Iraqi police.

The movement is believed to have infiltrated the Iraqi police forces, and to have been involved in the September 2005 arrest of two British soldiers by Iraqi police. On September 19, two British soldiers operating undercover in Basra were arrested following a confrontation with Iraqi police officers. British authorities subsequently launched an operation to recover the soldiers, using armored vehicles to breach the walls of a police detention facility. The soldiers were ultimately recovered from a nearby location after reportedly being transferred into the custody of militia members. The incidents triggered violent clashes between British forces, Iraqi police, and members of the Mahdi Army, as well as anti-British demonstrations throughout Basra. The incident highlighted the extent of militia influence within local security institutions and strained relations between British forces and Iraqi authorities.

On December 4, 2005, former Prime Minister Iyad Allawi was assaulted by a crowd during a visit to the Imam Ali Shrine in Najaf while campaigning ahead of the December parliamentary election. Members of Allawi's entourage were struck with rocks and shoes, while gunfire was reportedly heard during the confrontation. Allawi described the incident as an assassination attempt and suggested that supporters of Muqtada al-Sadrwere responsible. Sadr's representatives denied that the attack had been organized by the movement, while other local official disputed Allawi's account of the events. The confrontation reflected the growing tensions between secular and religious Shiite political factions during the election campaign.

In the December 2005 parliamentary election, the Sadrist movement participated as part of the United Iraqi Alliance, having secured a more prominent position within the Shiite political coalition. The alliance won128 seats in the 275-member Council of Representatives, with the Sadrist faction accounting for 30 of those seats. This electoral success further established al-Sadr's movement as a significant political force alongside its continued influence through the Mahdi Army.

=== October 2006 battle ===
In mid-October, a roadside bomb killed Qassim al-Tamimi, the chief of investigations for the provincial police force and a member of the rival Badr Organization. Badr fighters blamed the Mahdi Army for the killing and in response to this, the police captured a brother of the suspected bomber, who was a member of the Mahdi Army. Fighting began on October 17, when 800 masked members of the Mahdi army stormed three police stations in Amarah. Several firefights occurred between the militia and police over the course of the next four days.

By the morning of October 20, 2006, local leaders and residents said that victorious Mahdi fighters were patrolling the city on foot and in commandeered police vehicles and were setting up roadblocks. Sheik al-Muhamadawi stated early October 20 that "there is no state in the city. Policemen do not have enough weapons and ammunition compared with the militia, which has all kinds of weapons." At least 27 people were killed and 118 wounded in the clashes.

The Mahdi Army eventually withdrew from their positions in Amarah following negotiations between local tribal and political leaders and representatives from the Baghdad offices of Prime Minister Nuri Kamal al-Maliki. A battalion from the Iraqi Army sent from Basra then took control of the city.

The stunning and defiant display of militia strength underscored the weaknesses of the Iraqi security forces and the potency of the Mahdi Army, which had been able to operate virtually unchecked in Iraq. This caused many to accuse the Mahdi Army of starting the Civil War in Iraq.

=== August 2007 – March 2008 ceasefire ===
In August 2007, during fighting between the Mahdi Army and Iraqi police in Karbala, Muqtada al-Sadr called for a ceasefire and urged Mahdi Army members to stop fighting. The cease-fire has been credited with helping to reduce violence in Iraq between the Mahdi Army and Iraqi Army since August 2007. Amid fears of the ending of the ceasefire in February 2008, it was extended for a further six months by al-Sadr on February 22, 2008.

=== March 2008 Iraqi security forces crackdown ===
On March 25, 2008, thousands of Iraqi troops carried out a military strike against the Mahdi Army in their stronghold of Basra. This operation, code-named Operation Charge of the Knights, was the first of its kind since British troops withdrew from the city centre.

Clashes took place between security forces and the militants loyal to Muqtada al-Sadr after a dawn military offensive in the southern city. In Al-Sadr's headquarters of Najaf, the cleric ordered the field commanders of his Mahdi Army militia to go to 'maximum alert' and prepare "to strike the occupiers". Gunmen also reportedly clashed with Iraqi police in the southern city of Kut.

The Mahdi Army launched a nationwide civil disobedience campaign across Iraq to protest raids and detentions against the Mahdi Army. The discord threatened to unravel al-Sadr's ceasefire, spark renewed sectarian violence, and prompt the United States to delay troop withdrawals. Violent rivalries among Shiites had been predicted by many observers ahead of the 2008 Iraqi governorate elections, which were to be held by October 1, 2008.

Concurrently, on April 6, Iraqi and U.S. forces moved into the southern third of Sadr City to prevent rocket and mortar fire from the area against the Green Zone. U.S. engineers began construction of a concrete barrier along al-Quds Street to seal the southern third of the city off and allow reconstruction to take place. Over the next month, the Mahdi Army launched a number of attacks on the troops building the barrier but sustained heavy losses. On May 11, al-Sadr concluded a cease-fire agreement with Iraqi security forces, ending the battle. Mahdi Army losses were estimated at between 700 and 1,000 casualties.

=== Disbandment and resurgence in 2014 ===
On August 28, 2008, al-Sadr ordered the Mahdi Army to suspend military activity indefinitely. Later, however, al-Sadr created either two or three new organizations to take the place of the Mahdi Army: the Promised Day Brigades, established in November 2008 as a militia, and the Muhamidoon, which focuses on social work and religious education. A 2010 Associated Press report also mentioned a third wing, the Monaseroun, responsible for "the mobilization of supporters".

Since 2008, rumors of a Mahdi Army resurgence have cropped up periodically. In April 2010, after winning 40 of 325 seats in the 2010 parliamentary elections, Sadr called for its reestablishment.

In 2014 al-Sadr announced the formation of the "Peace Companies", to protect Shia shrines from the Islamic State of Iraq and the Levant.

== Iran's influence ==
Although Muqtada Al-Sadr has historically had close ties to Iran, he has generally opposed Iranian clerical and political influence in Iraq. Unlike the Al-Hakim family of the Supreme Iraqi Islamic Council and many leaders of the Islamic Dawa party who fled to Iran following the Gulf War and who remained there in exile until the American invasion in 2003, Muqtada al-Sadr and his family remained in Iraq throughout Saddam's rule. The refusal to leave Iraq garnered the Sadr family much support during and after the collapse of Saddam's regime. Early 2006, al-Sadr pledged military support to Iran and other neighbouring Islamic countries if they were to be attacked by a foreign nation. Since then, however, Al-Sadr has opposed the Dawa Party, and in 2006 Prime Minister Nouri al-Maliki ordered a major offensive targeting the Mahdi Army in Basra.

In late 2007 or 2008, Muqtada al-Sadr moved to Iran and spent several years studying Shia jurisprudence in Qom before returning to Najaf in 2011.

== Activities ==
As of August 2006, the Mahdi Army rarely challenged coalition troops on a wide scale. Neither the coalition nor the Iraqi government made any move to arrest al-Sadr. The Mahdi Army participated in battles against Sunni insurgents and operated its own justice system in the areas it controlled. The Mahdi Army operated death squads that frequently killed Sunni civilians, similar to many Sunni Iraqi insurgent groups like Al-Qaeda in Iraq, particularly during the civil war phase of the Iraq war. Despite this, Muqtada al Sadr claims to condemn sectarianism.

== Structure ==
When reporting on an early October 2006 clash between the Mahdi Army and Coalition troops in Diwaniyah, BBC news suggested that at the time, the Mahdi Army was not a homogeneous force, with local groups apparently acting on own initiative.

In September 2006, a senior coalition intelligence official had remarked to reporters how there were political fractures within Al-Sadr's organization in protest of his relatively moderate political course of action, with one coalition intelligence official claiming that at least six major leaders no longer answer to al-Sadr and as many as a third of the army was now out of his direct control.

== See also ==
- List of armed groups in the Iraqi Civil War
- Badr Organization A rival Shi'ite militia operating in Southern Iraq.
- Battle of Diwaniya
  - Operation Black Eagle
  - Operation Lion's Leap
- Ismail al-Lami
- Siege of U.K. bases in Basra
- Operation Together Forward
- Al Salam 313
