= Operation Leyte Gulf =

2007 military operation

- Part of Iraq War
Date	11 July 2007
Location	south of Mahmudiyah, Iraq
Result	American and Iraqi victory

Belligerents
United States Army; New Iraqi Army	Iraqi insurgency

Commanders and leaders
Abboud Qanbar (United States) David Petraeus	unknown

Casualties and losses
None	1 Captured

The ring leader of a cell responsible for conducting improvised explosive device attacks on the people and security forces of North Babil was captured by paratroopers south of Mahmudiyah, 11 July 2007.

== Operation Details ==
The Paratroopers of Company C, 3rd Battalion, 509th Airborne, 4th Brigade Combat Team (Airborne), 25th Infantry Division conducted a raid named Operation Leyte Gulf and captured the cell leader and four of his lieutenants.

The paratroopers also confiscated an AKM automatic rifle with five magazines of ammunition, four hunting knives, and a set of binoculars.

The cell members were detained for further questioning.

The weapons and other materials were confiscated for use in the investigation.

== Participating Units ==
=== American Units ===
- Company C, 3rd Battalion, 509th Airborne, 4th Brigade Combat Team (Airborne), 25th Infantry Division; along with elements of B Company, 425th STB (Special Troops Battalion), 4th Brigade Combat Team (Airborne), 25th Infantry Division.

== See also ==
- Iraq War
- List of coalition military operations of the Iraq War
- Terrorism
- Iraq Insurgency
- List of bombings during the Iraq War
- United States military casualties of war
- Post-traumatic stress disorder
- Iraq Body Count project
- Violence against academics in post-invasion Iraq
