= Operation Gaugamela =

Iraqi counter-terrorist operation

Date	July 2006
Location	just west of Kirkuk
Result	detained 154 terror suspects and seized hundreds of weapons

Belligerents
United States Army; New Iraqi Army	Mujahideen Shura Council: Al-Qaeda in Iraq; Other Iraqi insurgents

Commanders and leaders
Abboud Qanbar (United States) David Petraeus	unknown

Strength
3000	Unknown

Casualties and losses
None	None

Without a single shot being fired, more than 3,000 members of the Iraqi security forces (ISF) and Bastogne Soldiers from the 1st Brigade Combat Team, 101st Airborne Division, detained 154 terror suspects and seized more than 350 semi-automatic and automatic rifles, a variety of pistols and mortar rounds, as well as a large number of materials used to make Improvised Explosive Devices (IED) during Operation Gaugamela (gaw'guh-MEE-luh), a search for suspected al-Qaeda terrorists in the cities and areas surrounding Hawija and Riyadh, just west of Kirkuk, Iraq.

== Operation details ==
Following a request from local Sunni Arab leaders to rid the area outside of Kirkuk of terrorists, and as reports indicated a rise in the number of al-Qaeda in Iraq (AQIZ) moving into the area, the 10-day operation, covering 25 cities and villages spanning more than 900 square miles (2,300 km^{2}), began with a series of smaller Iraqi Army operations targeting 20 objectives with a history of terrorist activity in the Rashad area, southwest of Kirkuk. Using their own intelligence information, soldiers from the 2nd Brigade, 4th Iraqi Army Division planned and conducted the missions, detaining nine terror suspects and seizing a cache of weapons.

"This was the first time the Iraqi's in our area have self-sustained during an operation," said Captain Krista Jekielek, the Bastogne Brigade's logistics representative to the Iraqi security forces. "It was a significant validation, showing they are capable of moving the necessary personnel and supplies required to perform their mission."

Once the Iraqis had completed their searches and attention was drawn to the areas southwest of Kirkuk, operations quickly shifted to the Hawija and Riyadh areas.

"It was my intent to disrupt insurgent operations and to deny them sanctuary in these communities," explained Colonel David R. Gray, commander of the 1st Brigade Combat Team. "To do this, we made it look as though we were focused on the south, and then used the element of surprise to help us clear and control the areas to the north."

A combined U.S. and Iraqi force simultaneously set a security perimeter on the city of Hawija, preventing escape, while more U.S. and Iraqi forces air assaulted from nine UH-60 Blackhawk and eight CH-47 Chinook helicopters into the city and maneuvered quickly to the market at the city center. Once there, they immediately started a door-to-door search of every building in the city. Meanwhile, approximately 10 miles (16 km) away, another combined force set a security perimeter on the city of Riyadh and began searching every building in that city.

"The folks in Hawija were taken completely by surprise," said Major Scott Jones, an operations officer for the Bastogne Brigade. "You could see them scattering in all directions. They were running to get inside buildings, and jumping in cars to try and get out of the city."

As the combined teams of Iraqi soldiers and police searched alongside Bastogne Soldiers, AH-64 helicopters and coalition airpower provided cover from above. In all, more than 700 homes and buildings were searched. "The Iraqi Security Forces were extremely proficient and professional," said Captain Lyn Graves, an Army spokesman who patrolled Hawija with the ISF. "We moved quickly through several structures, and discovered an IED factory on the second floor of one building."

In addition to taking terrorists and weapons off the street, the discipline of the Soldiers involved in the mission truly stands out, according to Maj. Greg Bishop, a 1st BCT spokesman.

"The Iraqi and coalition Soldiers went into the two most contentious cities in the Kirkuk province, searched hundreds of homes and buildings and detained more than 150 suspects with no violence what so ever," Bishop said. "That's an incredible success and true measure of the professionalism of everyone involved in this operation."

== Participating units ==
=== American units ===
- 1st Brigade Combat Team, 101st Airborne Division

=== Iraqi units ===
- Iraqi security forces (ISF)
- 2nd Brigade, 4th Iraqi Army Division
- 18th Strategic Infrastructure Battalion (SIB)

== See also ==
- History of Iraq
- Iraq Body Count project
- Iraq Insurgency
- Iraq War
- List of bombings during the Iraq War
- List of coalition military operations of the Iraq War
- Post-traumatic stress disorder
- Terrorism
- United States military casualties of war
- Violence against academics in post-invasion Iraq
