= Basra Operations Command =

The Basra Operations Command is an organisation of the Government of Iraq which coordinates both Ministry of Defence and Ministry of Interior security forces in Basra Governorate. It was established in August 2007, and quickly became involved in the Battle of Basra (2008) ("Operation Charge of the Knights") against the Shia Jaysh al-Mahdī (Mahdi Army) militia in Basra. The BOC is headquartered in Basrah.

== History ==
In late 2008, United States personnel were worried by Prime Minister Nouri al-Maliki's attempt to exert control over the Iraqi Army and police by proliferating regional operations commands. "Using the Baghdad Operations Command as his precedent, Maliki created other regional commands in Basrah, Diyala, the mid-Euphrates region, and Ninawa, and others would follow. Initially coalition leaders welcomed the idea of regional commands that could create unity of Iraqi effort, but their enthusiasm faded as Maliki began to use the new headquarters to bypass the formal chain of command," which came to resemble the operating mode of the Saddam Hussein regime. The first commander of the Basra Operations Command was General Mohan al-Furayji, from September 2007 to April 2008.

The 14th Division was established because the 10th Division had responsibility for four whole governorates, Muthanna, Dhi Qar, Maysan and Basra. It was formed from units of the 10th Division, as well as other transferees from other parts of the Iraqi Army. From its establishment the new 14th Division was intended to take over from the 10th Division in Basra. In September 2007, the UK Parliament was told that "The appointment of the General Officer Commanding (GOC) and confirmation of Initial Operation Capability (IOC) is currently planned for November 2007."

"Charge of the Knights" was planned for June 2008, but it was launched three months early at the behest of the Iraqi Prime Minister, Nouri al-Maliki, while the 14th Division was still forming. The operation faced heavy resistance from the Mahdi Army and quickly bogged down with the 52nd Iraqi Army Brigade reportedly breaking during the fighting. The 52nd was the Division's second brigade which had only graduated from Besmaya Range Complex five weeks before the operation.

Later, after the formation of the 14th Division, the 10th Division transferred north to An Nasiriyah, reportedly Tallil Air Base.

Samir Abdul-Karim took over as the commander of the Basra Operations Command in 2014. In 2016, Jammil Al-Shammari was appointed as commander.

By 2017 the 14th Division, under Abd Muhsin al-Abbas, was based in Basra, but all its subordinate brigades other than the 64th Brigade were deployed to the north and west. The 50th and 51st Brigades had been reported in Al Anbar Governorate in 2016.

In mid-2020, Major General "Akram Saddam was transferred from Diyala to oversee all security forces in Basra. Afterward, Kadhimi promptly visited him and allocated the 3rd Army Commando Brigade to support his operations. In addition, Maj. Gen. Abbas Naji Adham was named as the new Basra provincial police director, replacing his former boss Maj. Gen. Rashid Flayih."

== Forces ==
- 8th Division – Diwaniyah – The 8th Division was formed from former Iraqi National Guard units, some of which were formed as early as 2004, but the division headquarters did not assume control of its area of operations until January 2006. As of March 2007, the division commander was Maj. Gen. Othman Ali Farhood.
  - 30th Commando (Mot) Brigade (Diwaniyah) (1-8)
  - 31st Commando (Mot) Brigade (HQ Hillah) (former 2-8)
  - 32nd Commando (Mot) Brigade (HQ Kut) (former 3-8)
  - 33rd Commando (Mot) Brigade (HQ Hussaniyah (Karbala)) (4-8).
  - 8th Field Engineer Regiment
  - 8th Transport and Provisioning Regiment

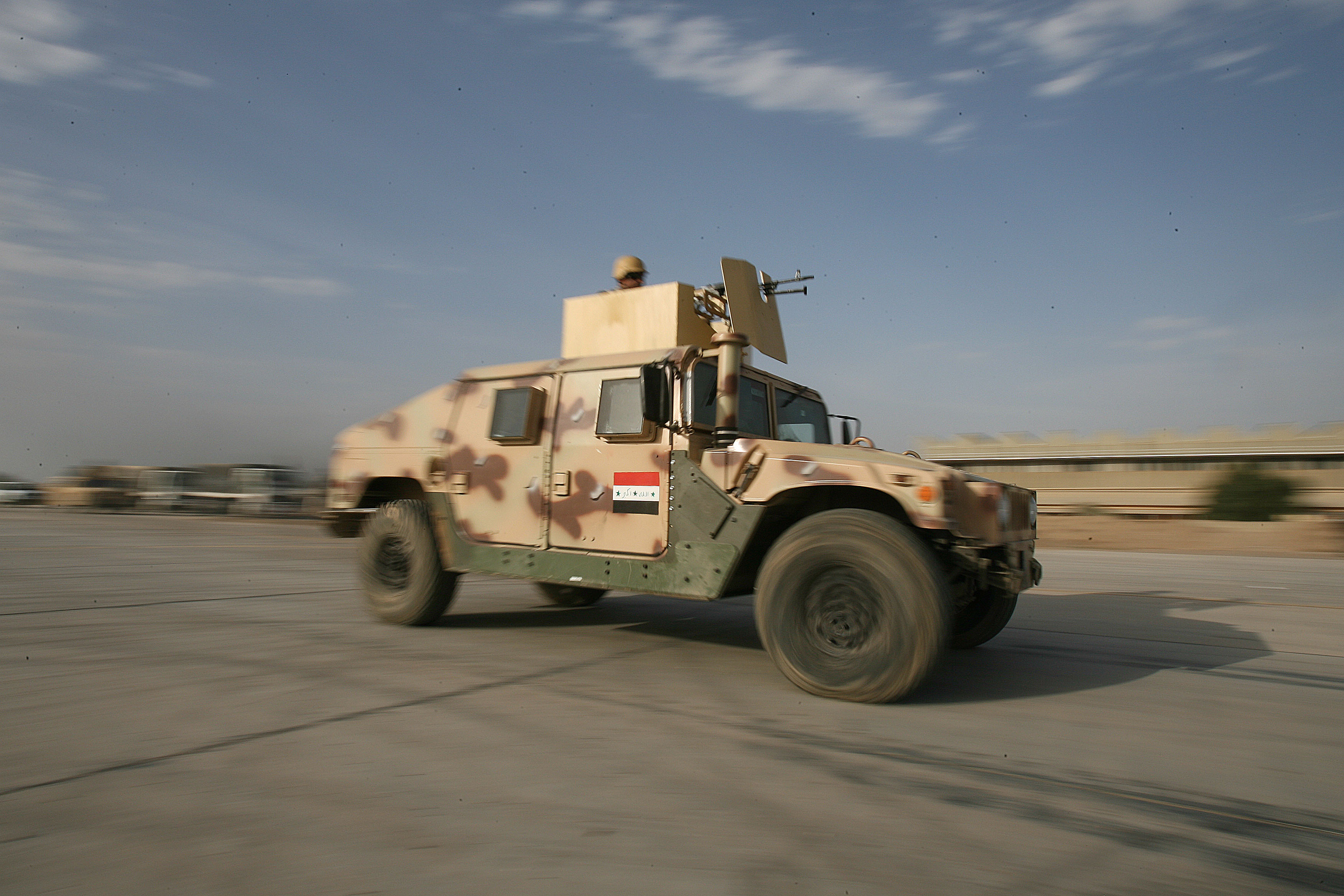
Iraqi Army HMMWV in March 2006

- 10th Division – An Nasiriyah (Tallil) – On February 23, 2007, the 10th Division, at that time based in Basrah, was certified and operational responsibility was transferred to the IGFC. Division commander is General Abdul Al Lateef, as of November 2006.
  - 38th Motorised Brigade (HQ Batria Airport, most battalions Al Amarah)(1-10)
  - 39th Infantry Brigade (HQ Samawah) (2-10) – 2nd BN currently attached to the 8th DIV and operating in KHIDIR North BABIL
  - 40th Motorised Brigade (3-10)
  - 41st Motorised Brigade (Majaar al Kabir) – formed in November 2008 (fmr 4-10?)
  - 10th Field Engineer Regiment
  - 10th Transport and Provisioning Regiment (Nasiriyah (Camp Ur))
- 14th Division – Camp Wessam, Basrah - division commander Maj. Gen. Abdul Aziz Noor Swady al Dalmy reported in 2010
  - 50th Motorised Brigade (Basrah)
  - 51st Motorised Brigade (Basrah)
  - 52nd Motorised Brigade (Basrah)
  - 53rd Motorised Brigade (Basrah) – forming in mid-2008
  - 14th Field Engineer Regiment (Basra (Shaibah))
  - 14th Transport and Provisioning Regiment
