= Siege of Sadr City =

Aspect of 2003–2011 Iraq War

Coordinates: 33.3889°N 44.4583°E

- Part of the Iraq War, the Iraqi Civil War, and the Battle of Baghdad (2006–2008)
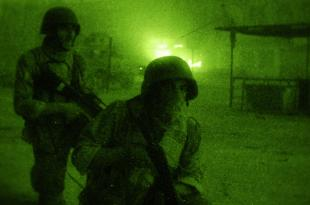
- Iraqi government soldiers during siege in Sadr City
Date	April 4, 2004 – May 11, 2008 (4 years, 1 month and 1 week)
Location	Sadr City, Iraq
Result	Coalition victory: Ceasefire agreement signed; Iraqi government forces allowed to enter and patrol Sadr City; End of the Iraqi Civil War

Belligerents
United States; Iraq; United Kingdom	Mahdi Army

Commanders and leaders
Robert B. Abrams (1st Cav) (Iraq) Abboud Qanbar	Muqtada al-Sadr; Tahseen al Freiji; Arkan Muhammad Ali al Hasnawi †

Strength
(Iraq) 10,000+ (May 2008)	May 2008; 6,000 – 8,000 (U.S. military estimate)

Casualties and losses
300 to 350 killed	800 to 1,000 killed

The Siege of Sadr City was a blockade of the Shi'a district of northeastern Baghdad carried out by US and Iraqi government forces in an attempt to destroy the main power base of the insurgent Mahdi Army in Baghdad. The siege began on 4 April 2004 – later dubbed "Black Sunday" – with an uprising against the Coalition Provisional Authority following the government banning of a newspaper published by Muqtada Al-Sadr's Sadrist Movement. The most intense periods of fighting in Sadr City occurred during the first uprising in April 2004, the second in August the same year, during the sectarian conflict that gripped Baghdad in late 2006, during the Iraq War troop surge of 2007, and during the spring fighting of 2008.

== Background ==
On March 28, 2004, the US leader of the Coalition Provisional Authority of Iraq, Paul Bremer, ordered the 60-day closure of Al Hawza, a newspaper published by Muqtada al-Sadr's group, on the charges of inciting violence against occupation authorities. The next day, thousands of Iraqis rallied outside the offices of Al Hawza in support of the newspaper.

On April 3, Bremer sent troops to al-Sadr's home and arrested Mustafa Yaqoubi, a top lieutenant, sparking further protests.

On April 4, al-Sadr issued a statement calling on his supporters to stop staging demonstrations "because your enemy prefers terrorism". "America has unsheathed its fangs and its despicable intentions, and the conscientious Iraqi people cannot remain silent at all. They must defend their rights in the ways they see fit," the statement said, according to The Washington Post. On the same day as this statement was given, the Mahdi Army began an uprising against coalition forces. The fighting spread across the south of Iraq, while in Baghdad the fighting was concentrated in the city's Shi'a areas, mainly Sadr City. This uprising occurred simultaneously with an offensive launched by Sunni insurgents in western Iraq.

== Siege ==
=== Beginning of the siege ===
As the fighting began on April 4, 2004, Mahdi Army militiamen ambushed a US Army 1st Cavalry Division patrol and Iraqi police were expelled from three police stations in Sadr City. Members of the newly-arrived 1st Cavalry Division and elements of the 2nd Armored Cavalry Regiment were sent out to recapture the stations. Eight US troops were killed and 51 more were wounded in the bloody battle. US forces from the 759th Military Police Battalion (759th MP BN) subsequently regained control of the police stations after running firefights with Mahdi rebels that resulted in the deaths of 35 militiamen; over 500 were reported killed by the Iraqi Ministry of Health. Mahdi Army members still maintained control over many of the slum areas of Sadr City.

On May 15, 2004, six soldiers from the New Jersey National Guard, assigned to the 759th MP BN as C, 759th MP BN, and operationally controlled by the 1st Cavalry Division, were pinned down by enemy fire. Their patrol element was equipped with two HMMWV's, and were ambushed at Al-Karama Iraqi police station in Sadr City. The six soldiers defended the Iraqi police–who were not willing to fight–as well as their station, taking on small arms fire and rocket propelled grenade attacks. The patrol's communications devices were blocked by surrounding buildings and the troops were unable to call for support. After several hours of engaging the enemy and defending in place while surrounded by ambushing enemy elements, the firefight was observed by coalition aerial support elements, followed by an armored vehicle patrol who assisted in their egress out of the Iraqi police station and the city. Reports later indicated that the coordinated enemy attack from the Mahdi Army consisted of over 100 militiamen, and the six US soldiers killed an estimated 19 insurgents while enduring no casualties to their own team–or the Iraqi police who refused to assist in the engagement. After the egress of the US Army element, the police station was completely destroyed.

The US Army did not establish a blockade around Sadr City and did not have military checkpoints around the slum. The coalition's task of destroying the Mahdi Army in the district was not easy for two reasons. The first reason being fear of mass civilian casualties if there was a direct attack because of the large number of people living in Sadr City. Secondly, the narrow streets in the district made US armored vehicle movement difficult because of their size. Despite this initial concern, the 1st Cavalry Division consistently retained freedom of movement in Sadr City, conducting multiple patrols every day and night. Mahdi Army militiamen, for their part, coordinated a system of security in the slum that ran parallel to the official police structure, but this soon crumbled as they suffered heavy casualties in the uprising.

In subsequent months, Sadr City experienced near-constant combat that was occasionally lifted following agreements by the Mahdi Army to end the fighting. These temporary ceasefires would be called off because of repeated violations of the agreements. The Mahdi Army occasionally shelled the Green Zone, the central seat of coalition power in Iraq, with mortars and rockets from the district. These attacks ceased when US Army artillery and attack helicopters destroyed militia mortar and rocket teams. The rocket attacks would return after a year, and grew both in number and sophistication due to the training of the Mahdi Army.

Militiamen also conducted raids against coalition forces outside Sadr City in other parts of Baghdad. On June 4, a Mahdi Army ambush on a US National Guard patrol on Palestine Street, near Sadr City, left five US soldiers dead. Occasional heavy street fighting took place, such as on September 7, when one US soldier and 40 Iraqis were killed and another 270 people were wounded during street battles on the outskirts of the district. Three other US soldiers were killed in a string of attacks across the capital that day.

=== 2006–2007 sectarian killings ===
In late 2006, insurgent forces controlled more than 80 percent of Baghdad, during which an intense sectarian turf war broke out between Sunni and Shia insurgents, including the Mahdi Army. Massacres occurred that left 50, 60 or 70 bodies throughout Baghdad per day.

Sadr City was spared from most of the massacres because of the blockade and the tight Mahdi Army control of the district. However, al-Qaeda elements conducted suicide and car bomb attacks in the district against the local Shias. One of the deadliest attacks was a series of car bombs and mortar attacks in Sadr City on November 23, 2006, that began at 15:10 and ended at 15:55, which left at least 215 civilians dead and some 257 wounded. Six car bombs and two mortar rounds were used in the attack on the Shi'ite Muslim slum. Three days later, on November 26, 2006, three more US Army soldiers were killed by an IED on the outskirts of Sadr City. They were PFC. Joshua C. Burrows of E Co 1-8 Cavalry, 1st Cavalry Division; 1LT. David M. Fraser; and CPT. Jason R. Hamill.

=== Operation Imposing Law and the August 2007 cease–fire ===
In February 2007, the coalition launched Operation Imposing Law with the sole purpose of wresting control of Baghdad from the insurgents. Heavy street battles, block-by-block, neighborhood-by-neighborhood, ensued for the next six months. There were several skirmishes on the outskirts of Sadr City but the coalition refrained from directly assaulting the district for the time being. During the spring and summer of 2007, several members of the British SAS, serving as part of Task Force Knight, were seriously wounded as the task force extended its operations into Sadr City. By late November the operation ended with southern portions of Baghdad still remaining in al-Qaeda hands and the whole of Sadr City still under Mahdi Army control.

In late August, heavy fighting erupted in Karbala between the Mahdi Army and policemen who were members of the rival Supreme Islamic Iraqi Council. More than 50 people were killed. Following this, Sadr declared a unilateral cease-fire to be implemented by all branches and elements of the Mahdi Army. The cease-fire was observed by most of the Mahdi Army, but coalition forces still continued to harass the Mahdi Army with constant raids. The coalition stated they were only targeting rogue elements of the militia. However, during this time a complete reorganisation of the Mahdi Army was conducted and almost all of the criminal and rogue elements of the militia were eliminated by Sadr. Despite this, coalition raids continued into March 2008.

=== March 2008 fighting ===
On March 25, an Iraqi military assault was launched against the port city of Basra, which was held by a number of militia groups, but primarily by the Mahdi Army. This led to the collapse of the cease-fire and the continuation of the fighting in Sadr City. Beginning early in the morning of March 25, Mahdi Army militia launched a number of rocket and mortar attacks from Sadr City at US forward operating bases throughout Baghdad, as well as the Green Zone. On March 28, the Iraqi prime minister, Nouri al-Maliki, declared an around-the-clock curfew on Baghdad after fighting spread from Basra into the capital. During the fighting on the evening of March 28, reports emerged that a unit of 500 policemen decided to defect and join the Mahdi Army. The next morning, in a well-publicized event in Sadr City, 40 men who said they were Iraqi police officers surrendered their weapons to Sadr officials saying "We can't fight our brothers in the Mahdi Army, so we came here to submit our weapons." In return, the Sadr officials gave the officers olive branches and Korans. The weapons were returned after the officers pledged not to use them against Mahdi Army members. "These weapons are for defending the country but not for fighting your brothers," said Sheik Salman al-Fraji, head of the Sadr office there (See also: Video coverage of event on YouTube). Another 15 soldiers also surrendered elsewhere in Baghdad.

During the heavy street fighting in Sadr City and its neighboring districts between March 23-31, 2008, 180 militants and 150 civilians were killed. Nine US soldiers were killed during the fighting along with a number of members from the Iraqi security forces. Two US diplomats and two Iraqi policemen were killed in the shelling of the Green Zone during this period.

On March 31, al-Maliki's curfew was lifted in most parts of Baghdad following another unilateral ceasefire called by Muqtada al-Sadr. However the curfew remained in effect in Sadr City into April and al-Sadr's ceasefire lasted until April 6.

=== April 2008 US–Iraqi assault ===
On April 6, 2008, the Iraqi National Security Council released a statement calling on all political parties to disband their militias if they wanted to participate in the elections later in the year. The statement was seen to be directed at Muqtada al-Sadr, who derived most of his support from Sadr City.

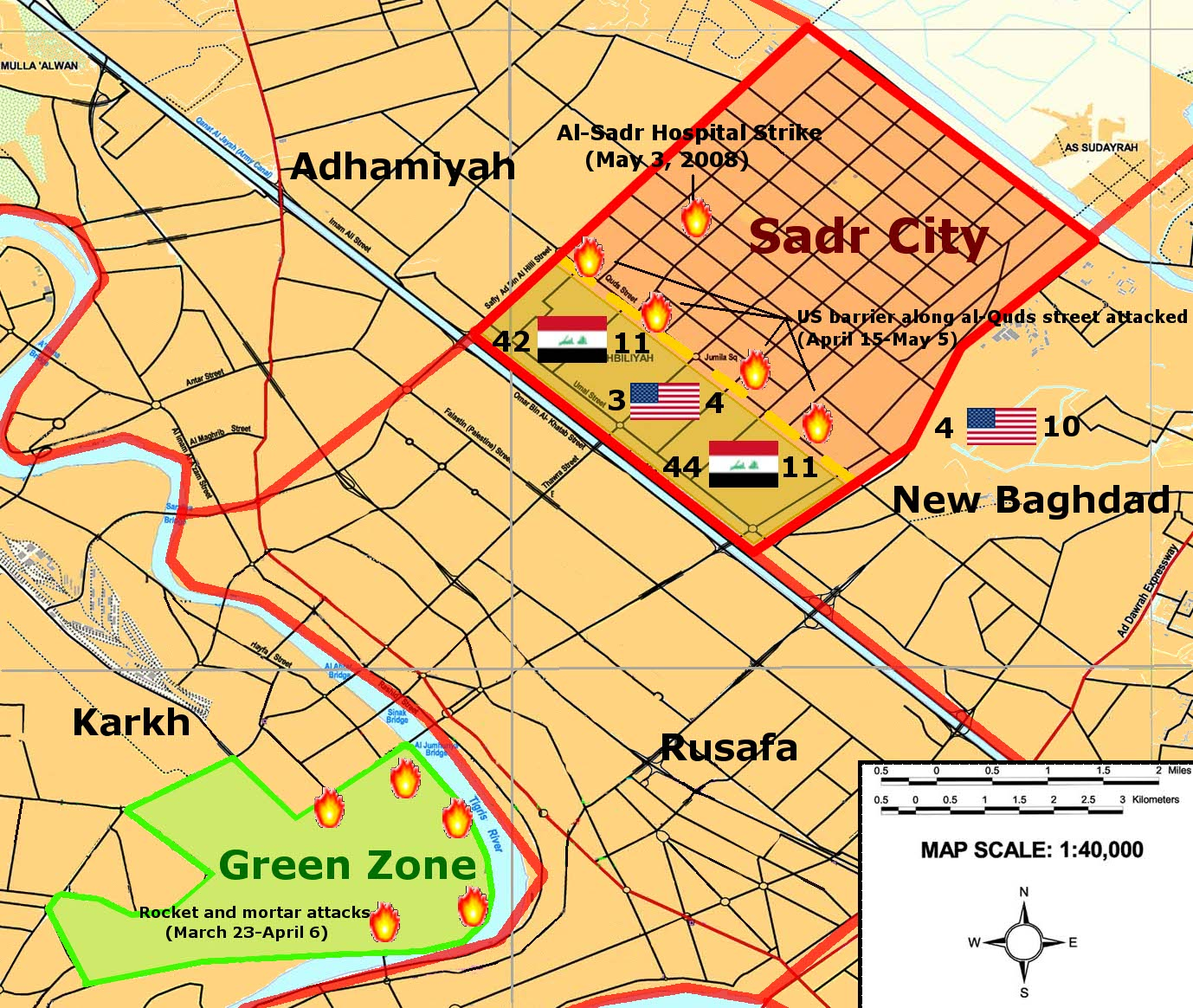
Map showing the location of fighting in eastern Baghdad, March–May 2008

On the same day, a joint US–Iraqi military force, including Iraqi elements drawn from the 11th Division, advanced into the southern suburbs of Sadr City, provoking heavy street fighting as militiamen opened fire with RPGs and automatic weapons. It was the first time US forces carried out a direct ground incursion into Sadr City. Two Iraqi Army armored vehicles and two trucks were destroyed and one US Stryker armored personnel carrier was damaged. US Apache helicopters provided air support during the battle, launching Hellfire missiles at militiamen and their vehicles. US forces reported nine militiamen were killed in one such air strike around 8 a.m. (local time) after militiamen attacked Iraqi troops with RPGs. The joint raid was a part of a coalition attempt to stop mortar and rocket fire on the Green Zone by seizing neighborhoods in Sadr City being used as launching points by the Mahdi Army. Rockets and mortar fire continued to fall on the Green Zone and US military bases around the capital during the assault. Three US soldiers and at least 20 Iraqis had been killed by the end of the day. 31 US soldiers were also wounded in the fighting.

Coalition Predator drones targeted militia mortar and rocket teams in Sadr City with Hellfire missiles daily. The fighting mostly stopped early on April 11, as US and Iraqi forces managed to advance down the main road through Sadr City and set up a forward defence line inside the district. However, that night, fighting continued when US and Iraqi units were attacked with small arms, machine guns and RPGs from high-rise buildings in the district. Snipers and roadside bombs were also used against a coalition convoy transporting concrete barriers for use in constructing an Iraqi Army checkpoint. The US military claimed it killed at least 13 Mahdi Army militiamen in three separate engagements following the attacks on its forces.

On April 15, the 769th Engineer Battalion, protected by 1-68 Armor Battalion C company M1 Abrams tanks, Stryker APCs and Apache helicopters, began construction of a massive concrete barrier along Al Quds Street, a major road separating the southern districts of Thawra and Jamilla from the northern districts which make up the heart of Sadr City. The barrier was designed to turn the southern districts of Sadr city into a protected zone in which US and Iraqi forces could begin reconstruction. Late in the evening of April 15, a company of Iraqi police deserted their positions at a police station 700 yards (640 m) ahead of the coalition positions and the Mahdi Army moved in to occupy the station. Although the company was a relatively green (new) unit which had relieved a more experienced unit only days before, it raised doubts among US forces about the Iraqis' ability to hold their ground. An Iraqi special reconnaissance unit recaptured the police station the next day.

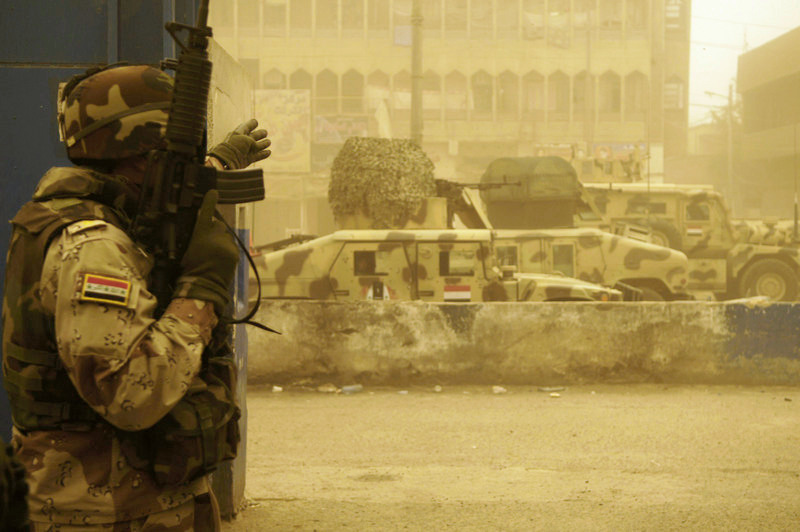
An Iraqi army soldier from the 42nd Brigade, 11th Iraqi Army Division, takes cover and points to where his men need to go during a firefight with armed militiamen in the Sadr City district of Baghdad April 17, 2008

On April 17, a heavy dust storm engulfed Baghdad and the militiamen used this to their advantage, attacking the coalition front lines under the cover of the storm. Militiamen attacked an Iraqi police station which had American advisors embedded with the Iraqis, fearing a repeat of Tuesday's desertions. As fighting grew and US forces prepared to send tanks and APCs to support the Iraqis, an Iraqi armored force arrived at the station before US forces were needed. Fighting continued throughout the night and new attacks were staged the next day as the storm continued and US forces were not able to send in helicopters, planes or drones to assist. On this day, another company of Iraqi soldiers deserted their post after almost being overrun by militiamen. The fighting finally died down in the evening as the storm lifted. In the fighting on April 17–18, 17 Iraqi soldiers and 22 militiamen were killed along with a number of civilians.

By April 18, coalition forces managed to capture a quarter of Sadr City, which was made up mostly of the southern outskirts of the slum. However, they were not able to advance any further. For the next week, US drones and helicopters continued to engage Mahdi Army forces launching mortars or placing roadside bombs.

On April 27, the Mahdi Army once again took advantage of a heavy dust storm, which grounded US aerial elements, to attack the blockades around Sadr City. 22 Mahdi army militiamen were killed when they attacked a US-Iraqi checkpoint. The checkpoint was supported by M1A2 Abrams tanks and no US or Iraqi personnel were injured during the attack. 16 militants were also killed in separate engagements throughout eastern Baghdad, according to a US military statement. The next day three US soldiers were killed by rocket and mortar attacks in eastern Baghdad. Another US soldier was killed in a similar attack in northern Baghdad. On the same day, seven militants were killed by US tank and helicopter fire inside Sadr city. In total, four US soldiers, 45 militants and eight civilians were killed during the 24 hours of fighting.

On April 29, US forces in Stryker vehicles tried to push deeper into Sadr City but were met with stiff resistance from fighters using machine guns and RPGs. After heavy fighting, the troops withdrew to their starting positions. 28 militants were killed, 6 US soldiers were wounded, several US military vehicles were damaged and three buildings used by militants were destroyed by US bombardment during the battle. This raised the number of militiamen killed in the three days of fighting in Sadr City to 79. Later in the evening one US soldier was killed in the vicinity of Sadr City. Two other US soldiers were also killed this day in fighting in other northern and northwestern parts of the capital.

Between April 30–May 1, the US military claimed to have killed 28 militiamen in a series of engagements beginning just before midday and lasting into the early morning of May 1. The largest attack occurred around 11:20 a.m. when US forces building the concrete barrier were attacked with RPGs, automatic weapons and mortars. 10 militiamen were killed in the attack and no US casualties were reported. Nine militiamen were killed while preparing to fire rockets at coalition forces or after placing roadside bombs. Eight others were killed throughout the evening in a number of separate firefights with US forces. A US special forces unit killed a senior "Special Groups" leader during a raid in Sadr City, bringing the total number of militiamen killed during the day to 28.

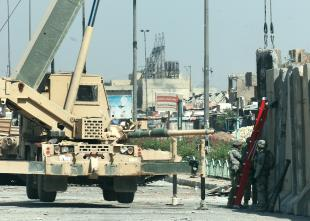
US troops from Charlie Company, 1-68 Combined Arms Battalion set concrete barriers in place in southern Sadr City, May 3, 2008

On May 3, US forces, using a guided multiple-launch rocket system (GMLRS), struck a militant command and control center housed in a building just 55 yards (50 m) away from the al-Sadr Hospital, one of two main hospitals in Sadr City. The strike caused heavy damage to the hospital, destroying or damaging a dozen ambulances and wounding 28 civilians.

Over the next week, militiamen in Sadr City and the neighboring suburbs continued emplacing IEDs, firing rockets and attacking US forces constructing the barrier along al-Quds street. However, US forces from the 2nd Stryker Cavalry Regiment, the C/1-64 Armor Regiment, 3rd Infantry Division, the 4th Infantry Division, the 10th Mountain Division and the 25th Infantry Division, supported by UAVs firing Hellfire missiles, Bradley APCs, M1 tanks and US Special Forces, inflicted heavy casualties on the militiamen. The US forces claimed that between May 3 and May 9, they had killed at least 76 militiamen. The vast majority of militiamen killed were killed by infantrymen assigned to A and C Co 2/30th Infantry Regiment, units from the 10th Mountain Division staged at JSS Oubaidy and JSS Baladiat, respectively.

Iraqi Special Operations Forces (ISOF), supported by US Army Special Forces, and US Navy EOD, were also operating in Sadr City. On May 6, an ISOF unit captured seven "Special Groups" members allegedly responsible for supplying explosively formed penetrators (EFPs) into Baghdad, as well as firing rockets into the Green Zone. Between May 8 and May 9, US Special Forces killed 13 "Special Groups" members while providing security for US engineers of the 821st Engineer company of the West Virginia National Guard.

On May 11, a ceasefire went into effect and on May 12 a 14-point agreement was signed between the Iraqi government and representatives of Muqtada al-Sadr, granting Iraqi military forces permission by the Mahdi Army to enter the district to establish security checkpoints and to hunt for rogue militiamen. Under the agreement, the US military would not enter areas of Sadr City north of al-Quds street, but the Mahdi Army promised to stop rocket attacks on US military bases and the Green Zone.

Just before dawn on May 20, six battalions of Iraqi soldiers entered the northern districts of Sadr City as part of Operation Salaam ("Peace" in Arabic). The Iraqi forces met no resistance as they took up positions formerly occupied by the Madhi Army, and were generally welcomed by Sadr City residents. Militiamen from the Mahdi Army handed Iraqi soldiers copies of the Quran as a gesture of goodwill. Iraqi forces secured the Imam Ali and Sadr hospitals as well as setting up a checkpoint and positioning tanks outside al-Sadr's political office. In a press conference, General Qassem Atta said Iraqi forces had safely detonated 100 bombs since the incursion began.

At least 941 people were killed during the siege of Sadr City. Among the dead were 22 US and 17 Iraqi soldiers as well as 331 militants and 591 civilians. 100 US soldiers and more than 1,700 civilians were wounded. 549 of the civilians were killed in Sadr City while another 42 were killed in different parts of Baghdad by mortars, fired from Sadr City, which missed the Green Zone.

== Aftermath ==
By May 21, 2008, Iraqi Army units had secured or captured all of Sadr City, receiving little resistance as the 10,000-man force supported by tanks rolled past barricades and into the center of the city. However, Mahdi Army fighters remained in Sadr City, blended in with the civilian population, along with their weapons.
