= 2008 Iraq spring fighting =

Battles between the Mahdi Army and the Iraqi Army

- Part of the 2006–2008 civil war phase of the Iraq War
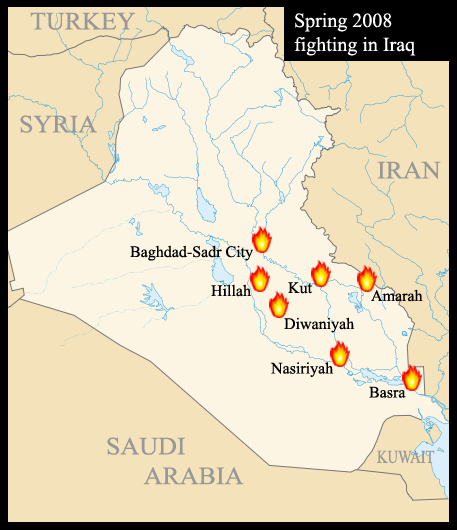
Date	23–31 March 2008
Location	Iraq
Result	Military stalemate, political Mahdi Army victory: Mahdi army militants granted immunity; Iraqi forces gain control of Sadr City; Iraqi forces launch further offensives to fully recapture the cities of Karbala, Najaf, Kut, Amarah, and Diwaniyah and the areas surrounding them; End of the Iraqi civil war (2006–2008)

Belligerents
(Iraq) Iraqi Army; United States; United Kingdom; Awakening Councils; Badr Brigades	Mahdi Army; Special Groups; Fadhila Militia

Commanders and leaders
(Iraq) Nouri al-Maliki (Iraq) Mohan al-Furayji (United States) David Petraeus; Hadi al-Amiri (Iraq) General Ali Haider †	Muqtada al-Sadr; Akran Hasnawi † Akram al-Kabi

Strength
400,000	60,000

Casualties and losses
(United States) 90 killed (Iraq) 191 security forces killed (Iraq) 1 militiaman killed (Iraq) 4 Islamic Dawa Party members killed (Iraq) 2,100 deserted, defected or captured	700 killed (US Claim); 2,000+ killed (Iraqi claim)
- (Iraq) 1,112 Iraqi civilians killed, (United States) 2 U.S. and 2 Indian civilians killed

The 2008 Iraq spring fighting was a series of clashes between the Mahdi Army and allies and the Iraqi Army supported by coalition forces, in southern Iraq and parts of Baghdad, that began with an Iraqi offensive in Basra.

== Background ==
In 2007, the Iraqi Army moved 4 brigades, including a tank brigade, and a special forces battalion to Basra, replacing the existing brigade stationed there which was reported to have been corrupt. The Iraqi National Police also moved two battalions to Basra. In August 2007, the Iraqi Army established the Basra Operational Command under the command of General Mohan. The Vice Chief of Staff of the Iraqi Joint Staff said "We do not have enough forces there. That is why we are having a new division, the 14th Division, to be built in Basrah, especially with the possibility that the British might be leaving us in time."

Since August 2007, a unilateral ceasefire was in place, imposed by Muqtada al-Sadr on his militia, the Mahdi Army. However raids were continuing on so-called "rogue" elements of the militia and tensions were building. In February, Sadr extended the ceasefire even though many of his commanders were against it. Despite the extension raids continued and members of the militia accused the members of the security forces of being infiltrated by their rival militia, the Badr Brigade.

== The Campaign ==
On 23 March, Easter Sunday militants of the Mahdi Army fired 107 mm rockets on the heavily fortified Green Zone in Baghdad killing Paul Converse, a U.S. government employee, and wounding several other employees and contractors. At least 12 Iraqi civilians were also killed by rockets from Sadr City that missed the Green Zone and hit the civilian sectors around the Zone.

=== Basra operation ===
On 25 March, the Iraqi Army and police attacked the second largest Iraqi city, Basra, which had for the most part been under Mahdi Army control for the past seven months since the British troop withdrawal from the city in the beginning of September the previous year. Since then the city was in the middle of a turf war between three different militias, including the Mahdi Army, for the control of the oil exports which had been dominated by the Black Market.

Street fighting spread through six neighbourhoods after the government operation started at 2:00am. Plumes of smoke were seen over the northern neighbourhoods, and by the end of the first day of fighting government forces took the center of the city but the Mahdi Army was still holding on to the northern part of the city.

On 26 March, the Iraqi Prime Minister issued an ultimatum to the Mahdi Army to surrender within 72 hours.

On 28 March, U.S. aircraft bombed two targets in the city while being supported by British planes, a day after militiamen paraded in the city with some 20 captured soldiers and a captured Iraqi Army Humvee. At least two Iraqi Army armoured vehicles and a BMP infantry fighting vehicle were seen destroyed on the streets. By 29 March, the Iraqi military offensive against the city was faltering in the face of stiff resistance as the 72-hour ultimatum by the government passed and the militants refused to surrender.

On 31 March, the fighting in the city ended after al-Sadr's declaration of a new cease-fire. By that point the Mahdi Army was still in control of about 75% of the city.

Up to 236 people were killed and 1,200 wounded in the fighting in districts of central and northern Basra. 921 members of the security forces, including 421 policemen and a full Iraqi Army battalion of 500 men, deserted, defected or were captured.

Clashes between militiamen and al-Maliki's tribe in Qurna, north of Basra, left 7 dead, including a policeman and a civilian, and 2 wounded on both sides.

Mortars also killed two policemen and wounded 23 people, including 13 policemen, in Karma, a town 50 miles (80 km) north of Basra.

Following the cease-fire in Basra there were still sporadic clashes in the city for some time leaving at least 32 civilians, 34 militants, five policemen and one U.S. Marine dead. Among the dead was also police Major Ali Haider, a commander in the police department's serious crimes directorate.

=== Post-operation Basra fighting ===
1 April: Gunmen are reportedly off the streets and Iraqis cautiously emerge back on the streets of Basra with opening markets and men cleaning up trash from the roadsides. Maliki claims military "security, stability and success" and vows to continue operations with a seven-point plan, including recruiting 10,000 new Iraqi security forces members and moving to enhance public services in Basra. 2500 citizens of Basra have already volunteered to work with the Iraqi army since the start of the operation, according to a US military spokesman in Baghdad.

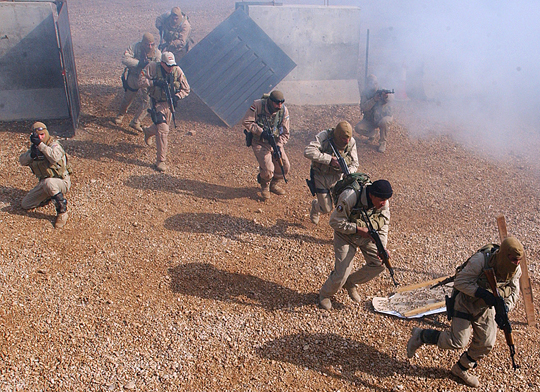
The Hillah SWAT Team in training in 2006. The unit was redeployed to Basra following operations in al-Kut and Hillah. On 1 April, they detained 20 vehicle smugglers in Basra.

Maj. Gen. Abdul Aziz Mohammad, director of military operations at Iraq's Defense Ministry, said the Iraqi military planned to seal and search every neighbourhood to capture suspected criminals and confiscate weapons. Sadr vows to continue fight against occupation forces "in a peaceful manner" and plans mass demonstrations against the Coalition on 9 April.

The Hillah Special Weapons and Tactics team detained 20 vehicle smugglers in Basra as part of "continuing deliberate operations against criminals to restore a rule of law", according to a US military spokesman.

The British defence minister announces a pause in troop reductions.

2 April: Lt. Gen. Mohan al-Furayji leads a 12 vehicle Iraqi Army convoy though the Hayaniya district, a Sadr stronghold in central Basra, in an apparent show of force. A roadside bomb explodes near the convoy, but there were no casualties. A reporter for an Iraqi TV station was shot in the leg while filming the convoy. Afterwards gunmen attacked the convoy and one Iraqi Army Humvee was torched. Overall, Basra was reportedly relatively calm for a third straight day.

U.S. Chairman of the Joint Chiefs of Staff Admiral Michael Mullen said in a Pentagon press briefing that the Basra operation is still ongoing and that it is premature to comment on the results of the operation.

A US Unmanned Aerial Vehicle (UAV) attacked a technical in the Halaf area of Basra, killing 6 "armed criminals" after heavy machine gun fire was reported.

3 April: A U.S. airstrike destroyed a house in Basra killing two militant snipers and at least six civilians. Iraqi Security Forces, advised by U.S. Special Forces, killed seven criminal members and detained 16 others during three separate operations in Basra directed by the Iraqi government.

Muqtada al-Sadr offers the Iraqi government to help purge militia members from Iraqi security forces. Sadr also angrily criticises the Iraqi government for "denying it sent envoys to him"

4 April: Iraqi PM Nuri al-Maliki orders his security forces to stop raids on suspected Shiite militiamen to "give time to those who are repentant" to lay down their weapons. The PM's order did not mention the Mahdi Army by name. Al-Maliki also ordered a resumption of reconstruction projects and services in the areas of fighting. 3,000 Iraqi soldiers and policemen, including soldiers from the Iraqi Army 1st Division moved into Hayyaniyah to distribute food and water to Iraqis who had been without supplies for several days.

Coalition forces attacked Mahdi Army members west of Basra and ordered an air strike during the ensuing clashes. Two children were killed along with another person.

In a Coalition raid during the night 10 militants were killed and two weapons caches, including 60 mm mortar rounds, rocket propelled grenades and explosively formed penetrators, were found.

5 April: A U.S. airstrike in the Hayaniyah district hit a militant mortar position killing one gunman.

6 April: The Iraqi Political Council for National Security, with representatives from all major political parties holds a meeting and agrees unanimously to a resolution with a number of points and actions necessary to "end the existence of this gang" (the Mahdi Army). Among those points is a decision that the Sadr trend will not have the right to participate in the political process or take part in the provincial elections unless they disband the Mahdi army. Iraqi Prime Minister Nuri al-Maliki continues to deny that any concessions were made or that Iran was involved in negotiating Muqtada al-Sadr's cease-fire order on 30 March 2008.

An explosion of unknown source occurred in Basra destroying a house and killing eight people. MNF-I confirms that an explosion occurred but denies involvement.

7 April: Moqtada al-Sadr offers to disband the Mahdi army if the highest Shi'ite religious authorities, including Grand Ayatollah Ali al-Sistani and senior Shi'ite clergy based in Iran, demand it. "If they order the Mahdi army to disband, Muqtada al-Sadr and the Sadr movement will obey the orders of the religious leaders", senior Sadr aide Hassan Zargani told Reuters from Iran.

8 April: A roadside bomb targeted the convoy of interior ministry spokesman Major-General Abdul-Karim Khalaf, wounding two of his guards in northern Basra.

9 April: The US military reported that Iraqi Special Operations Forces (ISOF) had captured 12 "suspected terrorists and Special Group members" and killed 14 others in operations in Basra in the past week.

11 April: The German Press reports that Riyad al-Nuri was the victim of an assassination as he left a mosque in Najaf on a Friday. He was gunned down by non-uniformed militants in the style of the assassinations that marked the Quds campaign in Basra. No group took credit for the killing. Riyad al-Nuri was Moqtada al-Sadr's brother-in-law, and a close aide. Moqtada al-Sadr lives in the Holy City of Qom, Iran and has become dependent on his aides in Iraq. _

12 April: Soldiers from the 1st Brigade of the 1st IA (QRF) Division from Al-Anbar, as well as elements from the 14th Division, cleared the suburb of al-Qibla in Basra "without incident", the US military reported. It also reported an al-Qaida in Iraq leader was captured by Iraqi forces in Abu al-Khasib, a small town 20 km southeast of Basra.

13 April: A policeman is killed in a drive-by shooting and two dumped bodies are found.

14 April: Richard Butler, a UK journalist held captive in Basra for two months after being kidnapped in central Basra was freed in an Iraqi Army sweep. Police Major Ali Haider, a commander in the police department's serious crimes directorate, is shot and killed.

15 April: Maj-Gen Abdul Jalil Khalaf and Lt-Gen Mohan al-Furayji are reassigned to posts in Baghdad. The Iraqi government says that the two chiefs are returning to their posts in the Defence Ministry at the end of a 6-month assignment to the southern city. Brig. Gen. Qassim al-Moussawi, an Iraqi military spokesman, said: "The two have done a great job and their efforts were highly appreciated by the commander in chief". However, a spokesman for the Sadrist bloc in Basra, Ali al-Suaidi, says the Iraqi government "wants to blame its failure on somebody" and the moves are "punishment for the botched execution of the campaign". According to Brig. Gen al-Moussawi, Gen. Furayji will be replaced by Maj. Gen. Mohammad Jawad, the commander of the 14th Division, in the Basra Operational Command and Maj. Gen. Adel Dahham will become the new police chief in Basra.

16 April: An unmanned U.S. drone plane launched missiles that killed four militiamen and wounded one more, but police said six people were killed and three more were wounded.

17 April: Gunmen tried to kill former police chief Brigadier-General Mohamed Kadhim al-Ali. One of his bodyguards was killed and two more were wounded. In a separate incident, gunmen shot and wounded a police commando. Also, two policemen were killed in a drive-by shooting.

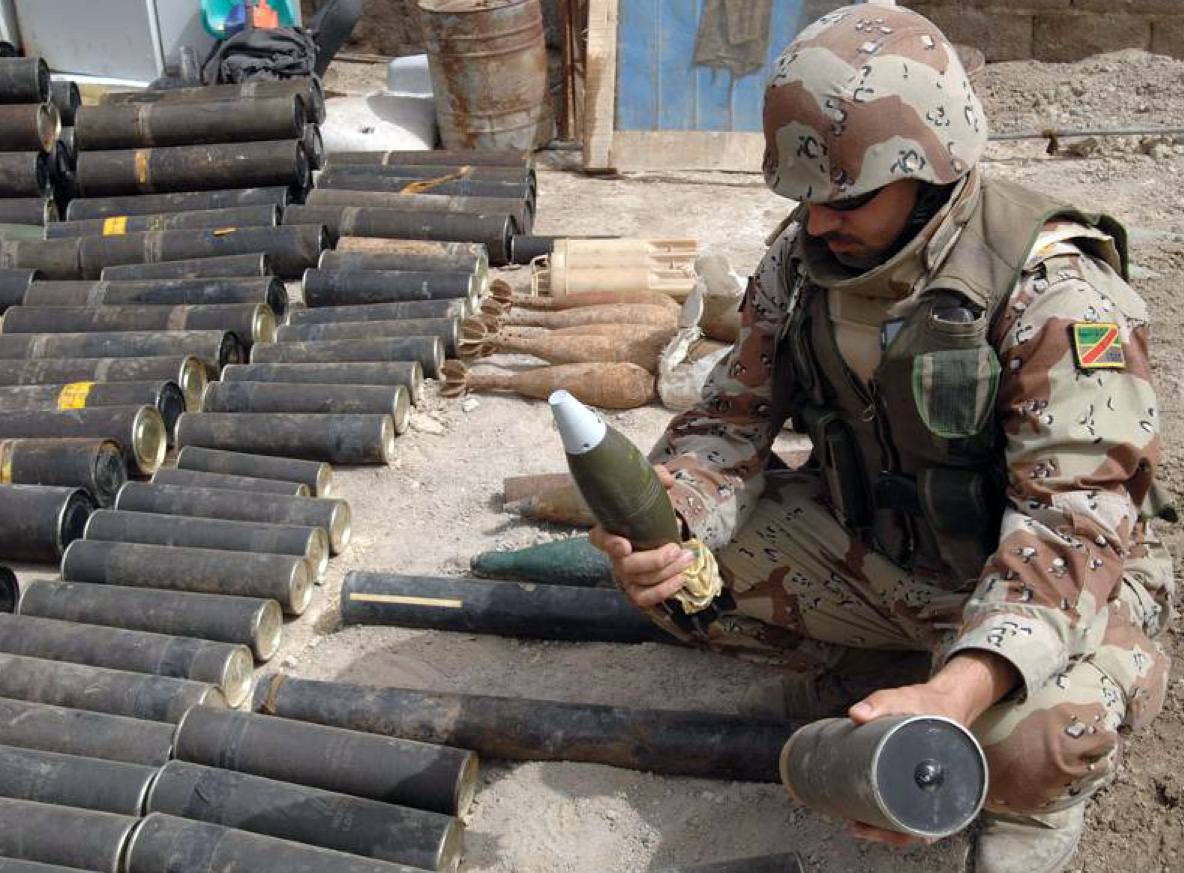
An Iraqi soldier from the 1st QRF division examines a mortar captured during clearing operations in Hayaniya, 19 April

19 April: Iraqi security forces launched a clearing operation in the Hayaniya district, a Sadr stronghold in central Basra. After a show of force in which coalition forces bombed an empty area west of Hayaniya, Iraqi forces, with advisers from the British Army and the United States Marine Corps., moved into the Hayaniya city center. According to General Mohan al-Furayji, Iraqi forces faced only "isolated skirmishes". A large number of weapons were captured during the operation, including 140 rockets, 50 mortars, 70 IEDs and a number of anti-aircraft missiles. Seven Iraqi Army vehicles were recaptured as well.

20 April: In a statement, Muqtada al-Sadr warned that he would declare "open war" if the campaign against him did not stop. Coincidentally, Al-Qaeda in Iraq released a similar message the same day, calling for a 30-day period of violence.

Iran's ambassador to Baghdad declared support for the Iraqi government crackdown against "lawbreakers" in Basra. Since major Sunni, Shiite and Kurdish parties have already supported the Maliki government in its crackdown for some time, Sadr appears increasingly politically isolated.

21 April: Two roadside-bombs hit two Coalition patrols in the city. One was an American, the second a British. There were no casualties suffered in the attack on the British patrol but in the first attack one U.S. Marine was killed and a second wounded.

Also, an al-Sistani aide who was wounded a week before in an attack in the city died of his wounds.

24 April: Prime Minister Nuri al-Maliki claimed historic victory over armed militias. "The ideology of having rival militias is over. The weapon is now in state hands", a statement said that Maliki told British Foreign Secretary David Miliband during talks. "We have political support from all [political] entities for the measures taken by the government", Maliki continued.

Multi-National Corps-Iraq commander Lt. Gen Lloyd J. Austin said in a press briefing that Iraqi security forces are in control of Basra.

25 April: Muqtada al-Sadr reaffirmed his cease-fire order. In a statement to followers read on his behalf during Friday prayers, Muqtada al-Sadr urged his followers to "observe more patience in commitment to the freeze decision." Sadr also tried to clarify his call for "open war" on 20 April, stressing that the threat "is meant against the occupiers only."

In the town of Qurna, near Basra, journalist Jassim al-Batat was gunned down by gunmen in a speeding car as he left his house.

28 April: A Sadrist lawmaker was killed and his wife was injured during an armed attack.

8 May: A British soldier is wounded and two unidentified foreign contractors are killed when rockets hit the main British military base in Basra at the airport. Coalition aircraft responded to the attack killing six militants who fired on the base.

10 May: Two civilians were killed and five others were wounded when a roadside bomb blasted a police patrol in Basra. Also, 14 suspects were arrested during raids.

=== Fighting in Sadr City and Baghdad ===
The clashes, soon after the start of the security operation, spread from Basra to Baghdad, mainly the Sadr City district of the capital, which was under the control of the Mahdi Army. 25 March: Militants attacked police and army checkpoints in the western and northern parts of Baghdad and the Green Zone was constantly coming under mortar and rocket attacks leaving dozens of people wounded and many Iraqi civilians killed by rockets that missed their targets. On the first day of fighting in Baghdad one U.S. soldier was among the dead, killed by a mortar in the Adhamiya district of Baghdad. The mortar was fired from the vicinity of Sadr City. In Baghdad's al-Amin neighbourhood, Mahdi Army gunmen stormed two offices of the Dawa party and clashed with guards there. Five Mahdi Army gunmen and two Dawa guards were killed. Fighters also captured six policemen with their two police vehicles from their checkpoint in New Baghdad.

26 March: Mortar strikes killed five people in the Karrada neighbourhood and four in Risala on 26 March. Another two people were killed in mortar attacks elsewhere. More rockets and mortars hit the Green Zone wounding four people. Among the wounded were two American civilians and one American and one Iraqi soldier.

In Sadr City militants were planting roadside bombs on a main thoroughfare and declared the ceasefire over. Mahdi Army fighters sealed off their neighbourhoods, blocking roads with refrigerators, burning tires and garbage. Heavy clashes erupted between militiamen and U.S. and Iraqi forces. A roadside bomb set a U.S. Stryker on fire in Sadr City but all soldiers inside survived. Also in fighting in northern and eastern parts of Baghdad two US soldiers and three Iraqi civilians were killed.

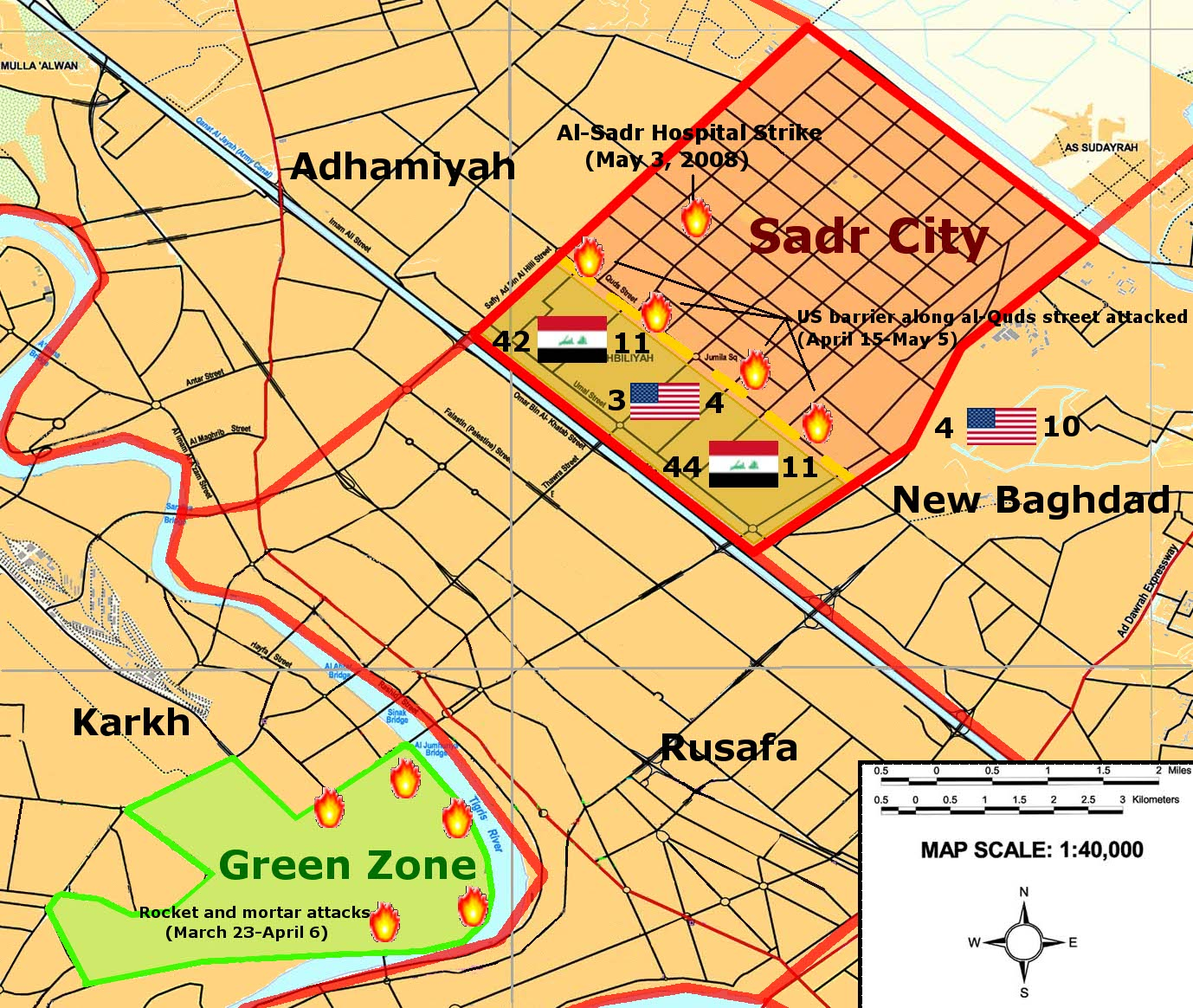
Map showing location of fighting in eastern Baghdad, March–May 2008

27 March: On 27 March, a mortar bomb at a Baghdad bus station killed three people and wounded 15 and 2 mortar rounds hit the Ministry of Interior, al-Tasfeerat compound in central Baghdad killing one employee and injuring four. The Green Zone was still being bombarded with one Iraqi civilian killed and another 14 wounded by misfired mortars. Several mortar rounds hit a building in the U.S. embassy complex in the Zone leaving one U.S. government employee dead and another three wounded. Also, a U.S. soldier died in the fighting during the day.

Street battles in Sadr City and other parts of the capital in the previous 24 hours left 88 people dead, including 68 militants, three U.S. and one Iraqi soldier, one Iraqi policeman and at least 15 civilians who were killed when an artillery barrage hit a market in Sadr City. At least 12 U.S. soldiers were wounded and three policemen captured.

Tahseen Sheikhly, a Sunni civilian spokesman for operation Imposing Law, was kidnapped by gunmen who stormed his house in a Mahdi Army stronghold in southeastern Baghdad and torched it. Three of his bodyguards were killed.

The Times reported areas of Baghdad were slowly falling into the hands of the Mahdi Army. The Mahdi Army took over neighbourhood after neighbourhood, some amid heavy fighting, others without firing a shot. In New Baghdad, militiamen simply ordered the police to leave their checkpoints, the officers complied en masse and the guerrillas took over their checkpoints. The US Army denied this. Lieutenant Colonel Steve Stover, the Public Affairs Officer for the 4th Infantry Division and Multinational Division Baghdad said "All checkpoints and ISF [Iraqi security forces] buildings are in ISF and/or Coalition control. No checkpoint is in enemy control."

In other fighting during the day a father and son were killed in the Talbiyah neighbourhood where at least eight Iraqi soldiers were wounded in street battles.

28 March: Early on 28 March, a U.S. helicopter fired a Hellfire missile during fighting in Sadr City in support of ground troops who were clearing a main supply route. Four militants and nine civilians were killed. Meanwhile, an insurgent mortar hit Iraqi Vice-President Tareq Hashemi's offices in the Green Zone, killing two guards, and a U.S. air strike killed three people and wounded six in Kadhimiya. In other fighting throughout the capital 13 militants and two civilians were killed and four U.S. Stryker armoured vehicles entered Sadr City and engaged militiamen. A U.S. soldier was killed by a roadside bomb just south of Baghdad.

Ten of the militants were killed by US forces when a joint security station in eastern Baghdad was attacked with small arms fire. In a separate incident, a US air strike destroyed a rocket site in eastern Baghdad. One U.S. soldier was killed the fighting.

Late in the evening reports came in that a unit of 500 policemen decided to stop working with the government and join the Mahdi Army.

29 March: In another day of mortar bombardment mortars landed in Shiite areas of eastern Baghdad, killing at least one person and injuring 12. The New York Times reported that in a well-publicized event in Sadr City, 40 men who said they were Iraqi police officers surrendered their weapons to Sadr officials saying "We can't fight our brothers in the Mahdi Army, so we came here to submit our weapons." In return, the Sadr officials gave the officers olive branches and Korans. The weapons were returned after the officers pledged not to use them against Mahdi Army members. "These weapons are for defending the country but not for fighting your brothers," said Sheik Salman al-Fraji, head of the Sadr office there. Video coverage of event on YouTube Another 15 soldiers also surrendered elsewhere in the city.

By this point the Iraqi Health Ministry reported at least 75 civilians killed and 500 injured in fighting in Sadr City and other eastern Baghdad neighbourhoods. The U.S. military sharply disputes the claims, having said that most of those killed were militia members. Two U.S. soldiers were killed by a roadside bomb in eastern Baghdad and one Iraqi policeman was killed in the Amil district by another bomb. A militia member was killed when his RPG misfired.

U.S. forces stated that they killed a total of 48 militants in Baghdad in the previous 24 hours, while three US Soldiers were killed in the fighting that day.

30 March: U.S. forces killed at least 62 fighters in fighting across Baghdad. Another mortar strike, aimed at the Green Zone, killed at least seven Iraqis and wounded 21 when two rounds apparently fell short, striking houses in the commercial district of Karradah. Gunmen also attacked an Iraqi checkpoint in eastern Baghdad, killing six troops. An American soldier was killed by a roadside bomb just north of the city.

31 March: Mortars fell again on the Green Zone, however there were only sporadic sounds of gunfire in the city, a day after al-Sadr declared a new ceasefire. One U.S. soldier was killed on the outskirts of Sadr City by a roadside bomb. Just before the fighting stopped eight civilians were killed in Sadr City due to American shelling.

1–5 April: During this time a cease-fire was in effect in Baghdad which eased the violence in the capital. However this will not last.

6 April – 11 May: A U.S. military raid in Sadr City provokes heavy street fighting in the district and most of eastern Baghdad which leads to the collapse of the cease-fire in the district. Two Iraqi Army armoured vehicles and two trucks are destroyed and one U.S. Stryker armoured personnel carrier is damaged on the first day of the street battles. U.S. Apache helicopter gunships swooped overhead during the battle. Militants shelled the Green Zone and other U.S. military bases around the capital. Unmanned Predator aircraft fired Hellfire missiles into Sadr City every day targeting the mortar and rocket teams. At least 941 people were killed. Among the dead were 22 U.S. and 17 Iraqi soldiers as well as 331 militants and 591 civilians. 100 U.S. soldiers and more than 1,700 civilians were wounded. 549 of the civilians were killed in Sadr City while another 42 were killed in different parts of Baghdad by mortars, fired from Sadr City, which missed the Green Zone. The fighting mostly stopped early on 11 April, as U.S. and Iraqi forces managed to advance down the main road through Sadr City and set up a forward defence line inside the district. However, that night fighting continued as U.S. and Iraqi units were attacked with small-arms, machine guns and RPGs. Snipers and roadside bombs were also used against Coalition forces.

On 17 April, a heavy dust storm engulfed Baghdad and the militiamen used this to their advantage. Gunmen attacked the coalition frontlines under the cover of the storm and heavy fighting ensued. At one point an Iraqi company deserted their position at a police station and the militiamen moved in but U.S. forces moved in soon to fill in the gap in the line. Fighting continued throughout the night and new attacks were staged the next day as the storm continued and U.S. forces were not able to send in helicopters, planes or drones to assist. This day another company of Iraqi soldiers deserted their post after almost being overrun by militants. The fighting finally died down in the evening as the sand storm lifted. In the fighting on 17 and 18 April 17 Iraqi soldiers and 22 militiamen were killed along with a number of civilians.

On 28 April, another dust storm swept through Baghdad and the Mahdi Army once again attacked the blockades around Sadr City. In an effort to resupply troops conducting extended combat operations, soldiers from 10th Mountain Division staged a 40-vehicle resupply convoy; however, Mahdi Army launched a devastating indirect fire attack against FOB Loyalty, killing four U.S. soldiers and injuring twenty others. In the ensuing fighting four more U.S. soldiers, 45 militants and eight civilians were killed.

On 29 April, U.S. forces in Stryker vehicles tried to push deeper into Sadr City but were met with stiff resistance from fighters using machine-guns and RPGs. After heavy fighting the troops withdrew to their start positions. 28 militants were killed, 6 U.S. soldiers were wounded, several U.S. military vehicles were damaged and three buildings used by militants were destroyed by American bombing during the battle.

On 3–4 May, an infantry company from the 10th Mountain Division attempted to isolate the Mahdi Army along the eastern boundary of Sadr City by placing barriers along major intersections. This was an effort to facilitate the Iraqi Army's movement into Sadr City. The U.S. forces met with strong opposition as militants attacked the soldiers with heavy machine guns, RPGs, and IEDs. The unit suffered heavy damages to men, weapons, and equipment, but maintained pressure on the militia and controlled the grounds. Using close air support, tanks, and armoured vehicles the soldiers defeated militia strongholds along the eastern sections of Sadr City.

On 8 May, the Iraqi government called on the residents of Sadr City to flee after more than 40 days of fighting, which left between 500 and 1,000 people dead. Due to the nearly constant violence, there are ongoing shortages of food, water, and other supplies.

On 10 May, Iranian backed "special groups" fired a surface-to-air missile at a US helicopter gunship over Sadr City, the missile was reportedly fired from an unknown location in eastern Baghdad but missed the target, it was reported to be a type 7 SAM.

On 11 May, a cease-fire agreement was reached, but despite this some sporadic fighting still continued in Sadr city.

During the latest round of fighting six Iraqi and three U.S. soldiers, six policemen, one U.S.-allied militiaman, 93 militiamen and 30 civilians were killed in clashes between the Mahdi Army and security forces in other parts of the capital.

Post-11 May:

12 May: Overnight clashes in Sadr city continued despite the cease-fire, the clashes killed 3 militiamen and 2 civilians and wounded 24 people. US military Spokesman Rear Adm Patrick Driscoll warned that a truce had not yet been brokered and that the Iraqi government and Shiite representatives were still talking, Sadrist lawmaker Nasar al-Rubaie said: said talks on final touches to the agreement were continuing. In fighting elsewhere in the capital 12 gunmen were killed.

13 May: Clashes between security forces and Shi'ite gunmen killed 2 Iraqi soldiers, 11 militiamen and 12 civilians and wounded 28 people in Baghdad overnight. One of those killed was a seven-year-old who died after an Iraqi army vehicle ran over him. Fighting also erupted in Baghdad's Shula district, another Mahdi Army stronghold. Also, one U.S. soldier was killed in a roadside bombing in a northwestern part of Baghdad.

14 May: In overnight clashes five people were killed in Sadr City. Also, two militiamen were killed while planting a bomb during house-to-house searches in the area.

15 May: In overnight clashes in Baghdad's Sadr City slum 7 people were killed and 19 were wounded. Two militiamen were also killed.

187 dumped bodies were found during the fighting throughout Baghdad since 23 March, all apparent victims of sectarian violence.

=== Al Kut fighting ===
In the city of Al Kut, the capital of Wasit Governorate, militants went out in the streets in force on 25 March, and took control of 5 out of 18 districts of the city.

Heavy street fighting took place on 26 March, and mortar impacts resounded leaving buildings and cars aflame. Another three districts fell into the hands of the militants for a total of eight. 35 people were reported killed, including a baby. 15 of those were killed when a mortar barrage struck homes amid the clashes. The security forces stated that six Iraqi soldiers and policemen died while 11 militants were killed in a combined US Special Forces-Iraqi SWAT patrol.

Also at least two policemen and one civilian were killed and another eight or ten policemen were wounded in fighting in the town of Aziziya just north of Al Kut.

49 people were killed and 75 wounded in Al Kut by 27 March.

Another four policemen and two civilians were killed in the next two days.

400 policemen deserted or defected during the fighting in Al Kut.

On 26 April, a raid was conducted in the city in which one Iraqi soldier was killed.

=== Hilla clashes ===
Fighting was also happening in Hilla, the capital of Babil province, where two people were killed on 25 March.

On 26 March, U.S. forces conducted air strikes in support of Hillah's Iraqi SWAT unit during fighting with Shi'ite militia in the Thawra neighbourhood. Iraqi police sources estimate the casualties at between 11 and 29 people dead and 18 and 39 wounded. At least 19 of the dead were confirmed to be militiamen. 9 Iraqi SWAT members were killed and two wounded during the battle.

The next day heavy street battles continued in Hilla, most of them in the city center, with at least one soldier and five policemen killed and another 26 members of the security forces being wounded. The offices of the al-Da'wa Party and the Supreme Council were destroyed by militants.

The toll in two days of fighting in Hilla was at least 60 dead.

On 29 March, a police source in Babil province reported that since the fighting began on 25 March 85 militiamen have been captured in the province. He also said a large number of gunmen had been killed.

On 3 April, U.S. soldiers, in civilian clothes, clashed with Mahdi Army fighters during an attempted raid to arrest rogue elements in the Mehdi Army. Later Iraqi police joined the fight and five people, including four policemen were killed.

On 4 April, a roadside bomb killed four policemen and injured one other.

On 5 April, the body of a police commando was found in the city, he was shot dead. Police killed one gunman and arrested two others when they tried to assassinate a local police chief in the town of Hamza al-Gharbi, south of Hilla.

On 25 April, a man was shot dead in the city. Six people were arrested in connection to the killing.

=== Other clashes ===
In response to the fighting the political movement of powerful Shiite cleric Muqtada al-Sadr launched a nationwide civil disobedience campaign across Iraq to protest the raids and detentions against the Mahdi Army.

Diwaniyah: On 26 March, seven Iraqi soldiers, a policeman and two militants were killed and another seven militants were captured and seven policemen wounded. On 27 March, one gunman was killed and a policeman was wounded in a security operation that netted eight suspects. The next day militia fighters killed the top administrator in a village near Diwaniyah.

On 29 March 200 local residents held a demonstration in support of the Iraqi operations in Basrah.

On 27 April, gunmen killed a police officer outside his home.

Najaf: Four mortars landed in different parts of Najaf on 26 March, and sporadic fighting throughout the city left two policemen wounded. A few days later a roadside bomb killed one army officer and wounded two soldiers when it struck their vehicle in northern Najaf.

On 11 April, gunmen killed a senior aide to Muqtada al-Sadr, Riyadh al-Nouri. He was the director of al-Sadr's office in Najaf.

On 21 April, an al-Sistani aide was killed in the city.

Amarah: In Amara, capital of Maysan Governorate, two soldiers were killed by unknown gunmen. Two civilians died in clashes on the Yugoslav Bridge in northern Amara. Gunmen attacked the Badr Organization Bureau located in Hitteen Square, in the centre of Amara, using RPGs.

Nasiriyah: Two Iraqi soldiers were killed near Nasiriyah as they were heading to reinforce the attack on Basra. On 28 March 2008, Sadrist forces had taken control of the center of Nasiriyah. In heavy street fighting 5 policemen, 10 militants and 20 civilians were killed. Another 52 people were wounded, including 19 policemen, 26 civilians and 7 gunmen. Another 13 militants were captured. The Mahdi Army had also taken control of the town of Shatra, 40 kilometres north of Nasiriyah.

On 29 March, the city was back under the control of Iraqi security forces, according to a provincial police spokesman.

On 19 April, a large firefight broke out in the village of Suq al-Shiyoukh, near Nasiriyah, which left 40 militiamen, 4 policemen and one civilian dead, another 37 militiamen were captured and 19 policemen were wounded.

On 13 May, one woman was killed in a mortar attack in the city.

Mahmoudiya: At least 12 militia fighters were killed and seven others wounded in fighting in Mahmoudiya, 20 miles (32 km) south of the capital. Some 15 Iraqi soldiers were reported to be captured. Four civilians were killed in the crossfire.

Karbala: In fighting in the holy city of Kerbala on 28 March 21 militants and 2 policemen were killed. On Friday night, Iraqi forces launched a major operation targeting Mahdi Army networks in Karbala. 12 militiamen were killed and 50 wounded. 30 gunmen surrendered to police on Thursday to benefit from the Iraqi prime minister's pardon. On Saturday an Egyptian in command of fighters in Karbala surrendered to police, along with 6 members of his group.

Hamza: Clashes with the Mahdi Army on 27 March, left three policemen dead in Hamza. Another officer was wounded along with two Iraqi soldiers. The next day another six policemen were killed. On 30 March, police forces supported by aircraft launched a large-scale attack killing four gunmen and arresting 30.

Suwayrah: In clashes Iraqi Army scouts and U.S. Special Forces soldiers killed 13 militants and destroyed two cargo trucks. Another three were killed the next day.

Nationwide: A roadside bomb in al-Kafl, which is just south of Hilla, left three policemen dead and another four wounded. A roadside bomb killed four policemen and wounded four more in Mahaweel, south of Baghdad. An Army Colonel was killed in clashes with Mehdi Army fighters in Numaniya, 72 miles (116 km) south of Baghdad. Militiamen attacked the village of Al Daoum, south-east of Karbala, killing five people, kidnapping six others and destroying four houses in retaliation against the families of Iraqi soldiers. In another attack on a village near Karbala five people were killed and two were wounded, around 150 people were forced to flee and fourteen homes were destroyed. On 21 April, the Iraqi Army reported to have killed 30 militants over the course of the previous 24 hours, in one of those clashes south of Baghdad six police officers were killed also. In the town of Hussaniyah, north of Baghdad, on 22 April, an Iraqi Army patrol, accompanied by U.S. Special Forces members, was attacked by militiamen, and in the ensuing firefight nine militiamen were killed. An Iraqi army officer was killed during an armed attack near his home in Numaniya on 7 May.

=== 11 May 2008: cease-fire ===
Shiite militants reached an agreement with the Iraqi government to end fighting in Baghdad's Sadr City district, a spokesman for Muqtada al-Sadr reported. The Iraqi government confirmed that.

However, despite the cease-fire, sporadic fighting still continued until 15 May.

== Aftermath ==
Following the first cease-fire at the end of March, the campaign had reached a stalemate between the two sides. However, by all accounts the Iraqi Army had a mixed performance during the clashes. Somewhere between 1,500 and 2,000 members of the Iraqi security forces out of 30,000 troops used in Basra deserted, defected or surrendered during the fighting. Basra was mostly under Iraqi Government control (70%). In Sadr City the Mahdi Army came to an agreement with Iraqi security forces to keep weapons off the streets and allow patrols of Iraqi Army convoys, and to give them the right to allow the arrest of members of their forces.

Following the fighting the Maliki government allegedly agreed to political concessions for a cease-fire, including legal and military immunity for the Mahdi Army and a release of its captured members, although Maliki denies any concessions were made. Many analysts said the Mahdi Army had scored a major political victory, which also presented the fighting capabilities of the militia that were, despite a lack of heavier weapons, far greater than those of the Iraqi security forces. However, this has apparently been objected to by the Maliki Government, since it continued its operations against Mahdi Army strongholds in Sadr City and Basrah.

The Mahdi Army stated that it will only disarm if the Shiite Clergy agree with Maliki's aims.

In light of the battle with the Mahdi army, there has been consensus from Kurdish, Sunni and the Shia political parties not aligned with Sadrists to support Prime Minister Maliki's efforts to impose Government authority in the south, even showing support to revoking the right of any political party to be represented in the October provincial elections if they continue to operate militias outside of Iraqi law.

By early May the fighting was centered mostly on Sadr City in Baghdad and Basra was reportedly under government control.

Some 5,000 fighters belonging to the Special Groups fled across the border into Iran during the offensive and after the cease-fire.

== See also ==
- Battle of Basra (2008)
- Civil war in Iraq
- Iraq Spring Fighting of 2004
