= Mohan al-Furayji =

Iraqi general

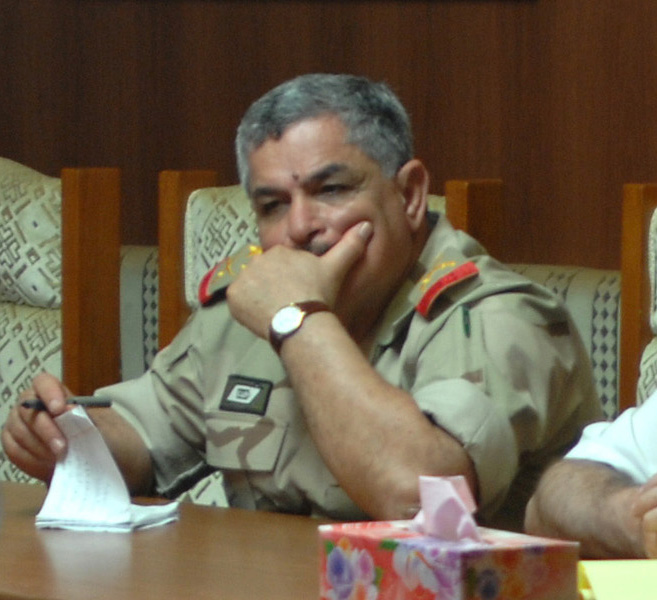
- Mohan al-Furayji in Uniform
- Military career
- Allegiance: Baathist Iraq ?-mid 1990s; Iraq 2003-present
- Branch: Iraqi Army
- Rank: General
- Commands: Commander of the Basra Operational Command
- Conflicts: Iraq War: Battle of Basra (2008)

Lieutenant General Mohan al-Furayji is a general in the Iraqi Army. From September 2007 to April 2008, he was the commander of the Basra Operations Command, an Iraqi Army formation in control of all Iraqi Army and Interior Ministry forces in southern Iraq. In April 2008, he was assigned back to Baghdad.

== Under the Saddam Regime ==
Mohan was a senior officer in Saddam Hussein's Republican Guard however, in the mid-1990s, he was imprisoned by Saddam in Abu Ghraib prison for 11 months, where he was routinely tortured. Following the collapse of the regime in 2003, Mohan was barred from joining the new Iraqi Army under the laws imposed by the Coalition Provisional Authority.

== Iraq War (2003-present) ==
=== Baghdad Security Plan ===
In January 2007, Gen. Mohan was the Iraqi Prime Minister's first choice to lead the Baghdad Security Plan but was reportedly vetoed by US forces. Lt. Gen. Abboud Qanbar, a veteran of the Iran–Iraq War was chosen instead.

=== Assignment to Basra ===
In June 2007, he was redeployed from the Iraqi Defence Ministry in Baghdad to Basra to prepare for the takeover of Basra from British forces. Shortly after he was appointed, he advised British forces to withdraw their forces from Basra, as their presence was increasing the violence rather than reducing it. In September, 2007, he attended the transfer of Basra Palace from British forces. Following the transfer, there was a sharp decrease in the number of attacks on British forces, from 60 a week in August to five a week. The improved security allowed British forces to transfer Basra province to Provincial Iraqi Control at a ceremony at the Basra airbase in December 2007.

General Mohan also began preparations for an offensive in Basra to reclaim control of the city from militias and began formation of the 14th Iraqi Army Division in Basra in November 2007, the second of two divisions under General Mohan's command. In an interview with a Telegraph reporter in March 2008, he described the situation in Basra: "The lawlessness in Basra is an insult to the Iraqi people and an insult to the Iraqi government. It simply cannot be tolerated." The operation was planned for June 2008, but it was launched three months early at the behest of the Iraqi Prime Minister, Nouri al-Maliki, while the new division was still forming. The operation faced heavy resistance from the Mahdi Army and quickly bogged down with the 52nd Iraqi Army Brigade reportedly breaking during the fighting. The 52nd was the Division's second brigade which had only graduated from Besmaya five weeks before the operation.

In April 2008, he was reassigned to Baghdad.
