= United States military casualties of war =

Military personnel casualties of the United States

The following is a tabulation of United States military casualties of war.

== Overview ==
Note: "Total casualties" includes wounded, combat and non-combat deaths but not missing in action. "Deaths – other" includes all non-combat deaths including those from bombing, massacres, disease, suicide, and murder.

War or conflict	Date	Total U.S. deaths			Wounded	Total U.S. casualties	Missing	Sources and notes	Deaths as percentage of total population
War or conflict	Date	Combat	Other	Total	Wounded	Total U.S. casualties	Missing	Sources and notes	Deaths as percentage of total population
American Revolutionary War	1775–1783	6,800	17,000	23,800	8,500+	32,300+			
Northwest Indian War	1785–1796	1,056+		1,056+	825+	1,881+			
Quasi-War	1798–1800	20	494	514	42	556			
First Barbary War	1801–1805	35	39	74	64	138			
Other actions against pirates	1800–1900	36	158+	194+	100+	294+		^{[b]}	
Chesapeake–Leopard affair	1807	3	0	3	18	21			
War of 1812	1812–1815	2,260	12,740~	15,000~	4,505	20,000~			0.21%
Nuku Hiva Campaign	1813–1814	5	0	5	11	16			
Creek War	1813–1814			575		575			
Second Barbary War	1815	4	134	138~	10	148			
First Seminole War	1817–1818	47	0	47	36	83			
First Sumatran expedition	1832	2		2	11	13			
Black Hawk War	1832	47	258	305	85	390			
Second Seminole War	1835–1842	328	1,207	1,535		1,535			
Mexican–American War	1846–1848	1,733	11,550	13,283	4,152	17,435			0.06%
Cayuse War	1847–1856	40	1	41	74	115			
Rogue River Wars	1851–1856	190	6	196	293	489			
Yakima War	1855–1856	32	2	34	92	126			
Third Seminole War	1855–1858	26		26	27	53			
Second Opium War	1856–1860	12		12	39	51			
Coeur d'Alene War	1858	36		36	60	96			
American Civil War: total	1861–1865	214,938	450,000~	655,000~		1,129,418+		^{[c]}	2.1%
American Civil War: Union casualties		110,100 to 140,414	224,097	364,511	281,881	646,392			
American Civil War: Confederate casualties		94,000	195,000+	290,000+	194,026	483,026			
Dakota War of 1862	1862	70–113		70–113	150	220–263			
Shimonoseki campaign	1863	4–5	0	4–5	6	10			
Snake War	1864–1868	30		30	128	158			
American Indian Wars	1865–1898	919		919~	1,025	1,944			
Red Cloud's War	1866–1868	126		126	100	226			
United States expedition to Korea	1871	3		3	9	12			
Modoc War	1872–1873	56		56	88	144			
Great Sioux War	1875–1877	314		314	211	525			
Nez Perce War	1877	134		134	157	291			
Bannock War	1878	12	0	12	22	34			
Ute War	1879	15	0	15	52	67			
Sheepeater Indian War	1879	1		1	10	11			
Samoan crisis	1887–1889	0	62	62		62			
Ghost Dance War	1890–1891	35		35	64	99			
Battle of Sugar Point	1898	7	0	7	16	23			
Spanish–American War	1898	385	2,061	2,446	1,622	4,068			
Philippine–American War and Moro Rebellion	1899–1913	1,020	3,176	4,196	2,930	7,126			
Boxer Rebellion	1900–1901	68	63	131	204	335			
Santo Domingo Affair	1904	1	0	1	1	2			
United States occupation of Nicaragua	1912–1933	90	69	159	290	449			
Mexican Revolution	1914–1919	120	61	181	319	500			
United States occupation of Haiti	1915–1934	10	138	148	26+	184+			
United States occupation of the Dominican Republic	1916–1924	144	40 (Note: See USS Tennessee (ACR-10))	184	50	234			
World War I	1914–1918	53,402	63,114	116,516	204,002	320,518	3,350	^{[d]}	0.11%
North Russia intervention: total	1918–1920			424		424			
North Russia intervention: American Expeditionary Force, Siberia casualties	1918–1920	160	168	328	52+	380+			
Warlord Era; Chinese Civil War	1918; 1921; 1926–1927; 1930; 1937	5	0	5	78	83			
World War II	1939–1945	291,557	113,842	405,399	670,846	1,076,245	72,491	See Note DA below	0.39%
Greek Civil War	1944–1949	1	5	6		6			
Chinese Civil War	1945–1950	14	150	164	51	215			
Berlin Blockade	1948–1949		31	31		31			
Korean War	1950–1953	33,686	2,835	36,574	103,284	139,858	7,564	See Note E below	
Cold War with the Soviet Union	1947–1991	32		32	12	44	126		
Cold War with China	1950–1972	16		16		16			
Vietnam War	1955–1975	47,434	10,786	58,220	153,303	211,454	1,584		
1958 Lebanon crisis	1958	1	5	6	1+	7+			
Bay of Pigs Invasion	1961	5	20	25		25			
Cuban Missile Crisis	1962	1	19	20		20			
Dominican Civil War	1965–1966	27	20	47	283	330			
Korean DMZ Conflict	1966–1969	75	6	81	120	201			
USS Liberty incident	1967	34	0	34	171	205			
Mayaguez incident	1975	38	3	41	50	91			
Operation Eagle Claw	1980	0	8	8	4	12			
Salvadoran Civil War	1980–1992	22	15	37	35	72			
1982 Lebanon War	1982–1984	256	10	266	169	435			
Operation Earnest Will	1987–1988	39	0	39	31	100			
United States invasion of Grenada	1983	18	1	19	119	138			
1986 United States bombing of Libya	1986	2	0	2	0	2			
United States invasion of Panama	1989	23		23	324	347			
Gulf War	1990–1991	149	145	294	849	1,143	2		
Operation Provide Comfort	1991–1996	1	18	19	4	23			
Operation Restore Hope	1992–1993	29	14	43	153	196			
Operation Uphold Democracy	1994–1995	1	3	4	3	7			
Colombian conflict	1994–present	0	8	8		8			
Bosnian War	1992–1995	1	11	12		12			
Kosovo War	1999 (Note: casualties during post-war peacekeeping operations (1999-06-12 through present) are not included)	0	2	2	1	3	0		
War in Afghanistan	2001–2021	1,910	415	2,325	20,093	22,311		^{[f]}	
Iraq War	2003–2011	3,519	973	4,492	32,222	36,710	3		
Operation Inherent Resolve	2014–2026	23	97	120	496	616		-->	
Raid on Yakla	2017	1		1	3	4			
2026 United States intervention in Venezuela	2026	0	0	0	7	7			
2026 Iran war	2026	14	9	23	624	643			
Total	1775–2026	666,447+	673,931+	1,308,468+	1,452,040+	2,852,901+	40,031+		

== Wars ranked by U.S. battle deaths ==
The following is a list of wars caught by number of U.S. battle deaths suffered by military forces; deaths from disease and other non-battle causes are not included. Although the Confederate States of America did not consider itself part of the United States, and its forces were not part of the U.S. Army, its battle deaths are included with the losses of the Union (American Civil War).

Rank	War	Years	Deaths
1	World War II	1941–1945	291,557
2	American Civil War	1861–1865	214,938
3	World War I	1917–1918	53,402
4	Vietnam War	1955–1975	47,434
5	Korean War	1950–1953	33,686
6	American Revolutionary War	1775–1783	6,800
7	Iraq War	2003–2011	4,424
8	War of 1812	1812–1815	2,260
9	War in Afghanistan	2001–2021	1,833
10	Mexican–American War	1846–1848	1,733
11	Gulf War	1990–1991	288

U.S. battle deaths by war
World War II	291,557
American Civil War	214,938
World War I	53,402
Vietnam War	47,434
Korean War	33,686
American Revolutionary War	6,800
Iraq War	3,836
War of 1812	2,260
War in Afghanistan	1,833
Mexican American War	1,733

== Wars ranked by total number of U.S. military deaths ==
Rank	War	Years	Deaths	Deaths per day	U.S. population in first year of war	Deaths as percentage of population
1	American Civil War	1861–1865	655,000 (est.)(U.S./Confederate)	449	31,443,000	2.11% (1860)
2	World War II	1941–1945	405,399	297	133,402,000	0.307% (1940)
3	World War I	1917–1918	116,516	200	103,268,000	0.110% (1920)
4	Vietnam War	1961–1975	58,209	11	179,323,175	0.032% (1970)
5	Korean War	1950–1953	36,574	30	151,325,000	0.024% (1950)
6	American Revolutionary War	1775–1783	25,000	11	2,500,000	1.00% (1780)
7	War of 1812	1812–1815	15,000	15	8,000,000	0.207% (1810)
8	Mexican–American War	1846–1848	13,283	29	21,406,000	0.057% (1850)
9	Iraq War	2003–2011	4,576	2	294,043,000	0.002% (2010)
10	Philippine–American War	1899–1902	4,196	3.8	72,129,001	0.006% (1900)
11	War in Afghanistan	2001–2021	2,432	0.3	294,043,000	0.001% (2010)
12	Spanish–American War	1898	2,246	9.6	62,022,250	0.004% (1890)

"Deaths per day" is the total number of Americans killed in military service, divided by the number of days between the commencement and end of hostilities. "Deaths per population" is the total number of deaths in military service, divided by the U.S. population of the year indicated.

== Notes ==
a. Revolutionary War: All figures from the Revolutionary War are rounded estimates. Commonly cited casualty figures provided by the Department of Defense are 4,435 killed and 6,188 wounded, although the original government report that generated these numbers warned that the totals were incomplete and far too low. In 1974, historian Howard Peckham and a team of researchers came up with a total of 6,824 killed in action and 8,445 wounded. Because of incomplete records, Peckham estimated that this new total number of killed in action was still about 1,000 too low. Military historian John Shy subsequently estimated the total killed in action at 8,000, and argued that the number of wounded was probably far higher, about 25,000. The "other" deaths are primarily from disease, including prisoners who died on British prison ships.

b. Other actions against pirates: Includes actions fought in the West Indies, the Greek isles, off of Louisiana, China and Vietnam. Other deaths resulted from disease and accidents.

c. Civil War: All Union casualty figures, and Confederate killed in action, from The Oxford Companion to American Military History except where noted (NPS figures). estimate of total Confederate dead from James M. McPherson, Battle Cry of Freedom (Oxford University Press, 1988), 854. Newer estimates place the total death toll at 650,000 to 850,000. 148 of the Union dead were U.S. Marines.
ca. Civil War April 2, 2012, Doctor David Hacker after extensive research offered new casualty rates higher by 20%; his work has been accepted by the academic community and is represented here.

d. World War I figures include expeditions in North Russia and Siberia. See also World War I casualties

da. World War II Note: as of March 31, 1946, there were an estimated 286,959 dead of whom 246,492 were identified; of 40,467 who were unidentified 18,641 were located {10,986 reposed in military cemeteries and 7,655 in isolated graves} and 21,826 were reported not located. As of April 6, 1946, there were 539 American Military Cemeteries which contained 241,500 dead. Note the American Battle Monuments Commission database for the World War II reports that in 18 ABMC Cemeteries total of 93,238 buried and 78,979 missing and that "The World War II database on this web site contains the names of those buried at our cemeteries, or listed as Missing in Action, buried or lost at sea. It does not contain the names of the 233,174 Americans returned to the United States for burial..." Similarly, the ABMC Records do not cover inter-war deaths such as the Port Chicago disaster in which 320 died. As of June 2018 total of US World War II casualties listed as MIA is 72,823

e. Korean War: Note: gives Dead as 33,746 and Wounded as 103, 284 and MIA as 8,177. The American Battle Monuments Commission database for the Korean War reports that "The Department of Defense reports that 54,246 American service men and women lost their lives during the Korean War. This includes all losses worldwide. Since the Korean War Veterans Memorial in Washington, D.C., honors all U.S. Military who lost their lives during the War, we have tried to obtain the names of those who died in other areas besides Korea during the period June 27, 1950, to July 27, 1954, one year after the Korean Armistice...". {For a breakdown of Worldwide casualties of 54,246 see The Korean War educator at gives figures as In-theatre/non theater} After their retreat in 1950, dead Marines and soldiers were buried at a temporary gravesite near Hungnam, North Korea. During "Operation Glory" which occurred from July to November 1954 the dead of each side were exchanged; remains of 4,167 US soldiers/Marines were exchanged for 13,528 North Korean/Chinese dead. After "Operation Glory" 416 Korean War "unknowns" were buried in the Punchbowl Cemetery. According to a DPMO white paper. 1,394 names were also transmitted during "Operation Glory" from the Chinese and North Koreans, of whom 858 names proved to be correct; of the 4,167 returned remains were found to be 4,219 individuals of whom 2,944 were found to be Americans of whom all but 416 were identified by name. Of 239 Korean War unaccounted for: 186 not associated with Punchbowl unknowns (176 were identified and of the remaining 10 cases 4 were non-Americans of Asiatic descent; one was British; 3 were identified and 2 cases unconfirmed); Of 10 Korean War "Punchbowl Unknowns" 6 were identified. The W.A. Johnson listing of 496 POWs – including 25 civilians – who died in North Korea can be found here and there

Listed as MIA: 7,683

ea. Cold War – Korea and Vietnam and Middle East-additional US Casualties:

- North Korea {Cold War} 1959: 1968–69; 1976; 1984 killed 41; Wounded 5; 82 captured/released.
- USS Liberty incident 1967 killed 34; Wounded 173 by Israeli armed forces
- Vietnam War prior to 1964-US Casualties were Laos – 2 killed in 1954; and Vietnam 1946–1954 – 2 killed see;

f. Iraq War. See also Casualties of the Iraq War. Sources: .

g. Afghanistan. Casualties include those that occurred in Pakistan, Uzbekistan, Djibouti, Eritrea, Ethiopia, Guantanamo Bay (Cuba), Jordan, Kenya, Kyrgyzstan, Philippines, Seychelles, Sudan, Tajikistan, Turkey, and Yemen.

== See also ==
- Military history of the United States
- World War II casualties
