= Abboud Qanbar =

Iraqi General

Abboud Qanbar Al-Maliky
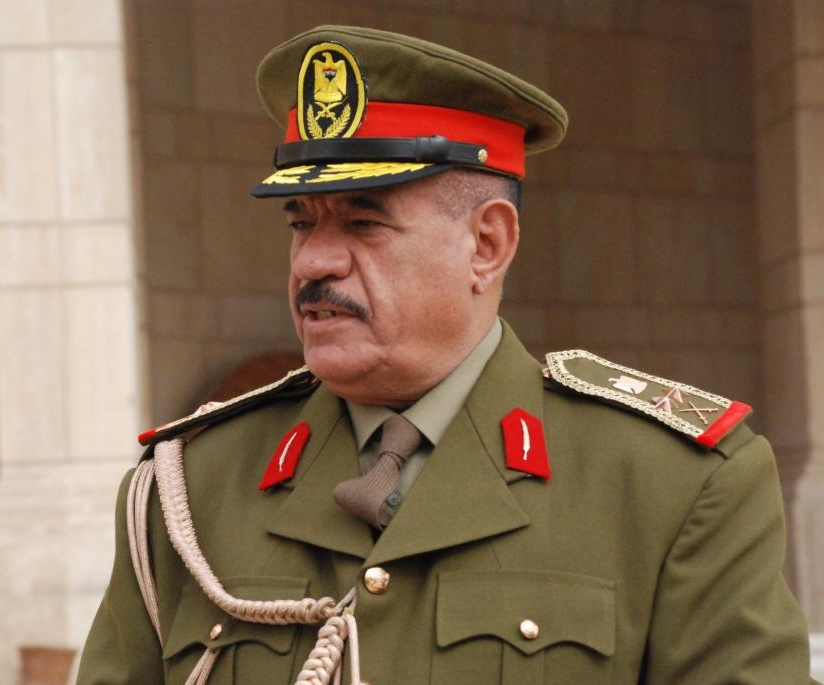
- Born: 1945 (age 80–81); Maysān, Iraq
- Allegiance: Iraq
- Branch: Special forces - Navy (Iraq)
- Service years: 1967–present
- Rank: General
- Commands: Deputy Force Commander of Marine and Coastal Defense; Military Partition Commander of Failaka; Director of Iraqi Infantry; Director of the Office of the Commander in Chief of the Iraqi Armed Forces; Commander of Baghdad crackdown operations Deputy Army Chief of Staff
- Conflicts: Iran–Iraq War; Gulf War; Iraq War; Operation Imposing Law; Operation Phantom Strike; 2014 Northern Iraq offensive

Abboud Qanbar (Arabic: عبود قنبر) is an Iraqi General. On January 13, 2007, he was appointed by Prime Minister Nouri Maliki as the Iraqi commander for the Baghdad Operations Command, which controlled all Iraqi security forces in Baghdad (sans Iraqi Special Operations Forces) and was charged with securing the capital. His chief of staff is Major General Hassan, and his chief of plans is Staff Colonel Abd Alamir. He hails from Amarah, a city in Southern Iraq.

Qanbar was a commander in the navy during Saddam Hussein's reign, and took part in the Iran–Iraq War of 1980–88, and the war over Kuwait in 1990-91. In the latter, he commanded a garrison on the Kuwaiti island of Failaka, and was taken prisoner by U.S. Marines. He was a brigadier general in the navy during the 1991 Gulf War. After being captured in Failaka, he was briefly transferred to Saudi Arabia before his release. Despite being captured by American forces, Qanbar was later decorated by Saddam for his bravery in defense of the island.

He was appointed by Iraqi Prime Minister Nouri al-Maliki to lead the 2007 Baghdad crackdown in February 2007, though he was considered a relatively unknown officer. Qanbar was a compromise choice after the U.S. military rejected Maliki's first choice, Mohan al-Freiji. Qanbar announced the details of the new security plan on live Iraqi television on February 13.
