= Besmaya Range Complex =

Besmaya Range Complex
- Baqubah, Diyala Governorate in Iraq

Site information
- Owner: Ministry of Defence
- Operator: Iraqi Armed Forces

Location
- Coordinates: 33°47′31″N 44°36′19″E

Site history
- Built: 2007
- In use: 2007-present

Besmaya Range Complex is a joint base controlled by the Iraqi Armed Forces. It was known as Forward Operating Base Hammer during American occupation.

== Role and Structure of Besmaya Range Complex ==
Besmaya Range Complex was originally an Iraqi training center and a former facility used by the Republican Guard. After U.S. occupation, Forward Operating Base Hammer was established nearby but functioned as a separate entity. Besmaya Range Complex housed a coalition force composed of military personnel and an estimate of 60 contractors who were stationed in a designated cantonment area within the Iraqi garrison. This coalition force was primarily engaged in advising the garrison commander and supporting training schools like the Bomb Disposal and Combat Arms School.

== Logistical Independence and Support Framework ==
The coalition personnel stationed at Besmaya were not under the operational control or administrative control of FOB Hammer, except for limited logistical support such as vehicle fueling and post exchange access. All other support was directly provided to Besmaya coalition personnel through the Multi-National Security Transition Command-Iraq (MNSTC-I).
