= Abbasid architecture =

Islamic building style from the 8th to 13th centuries

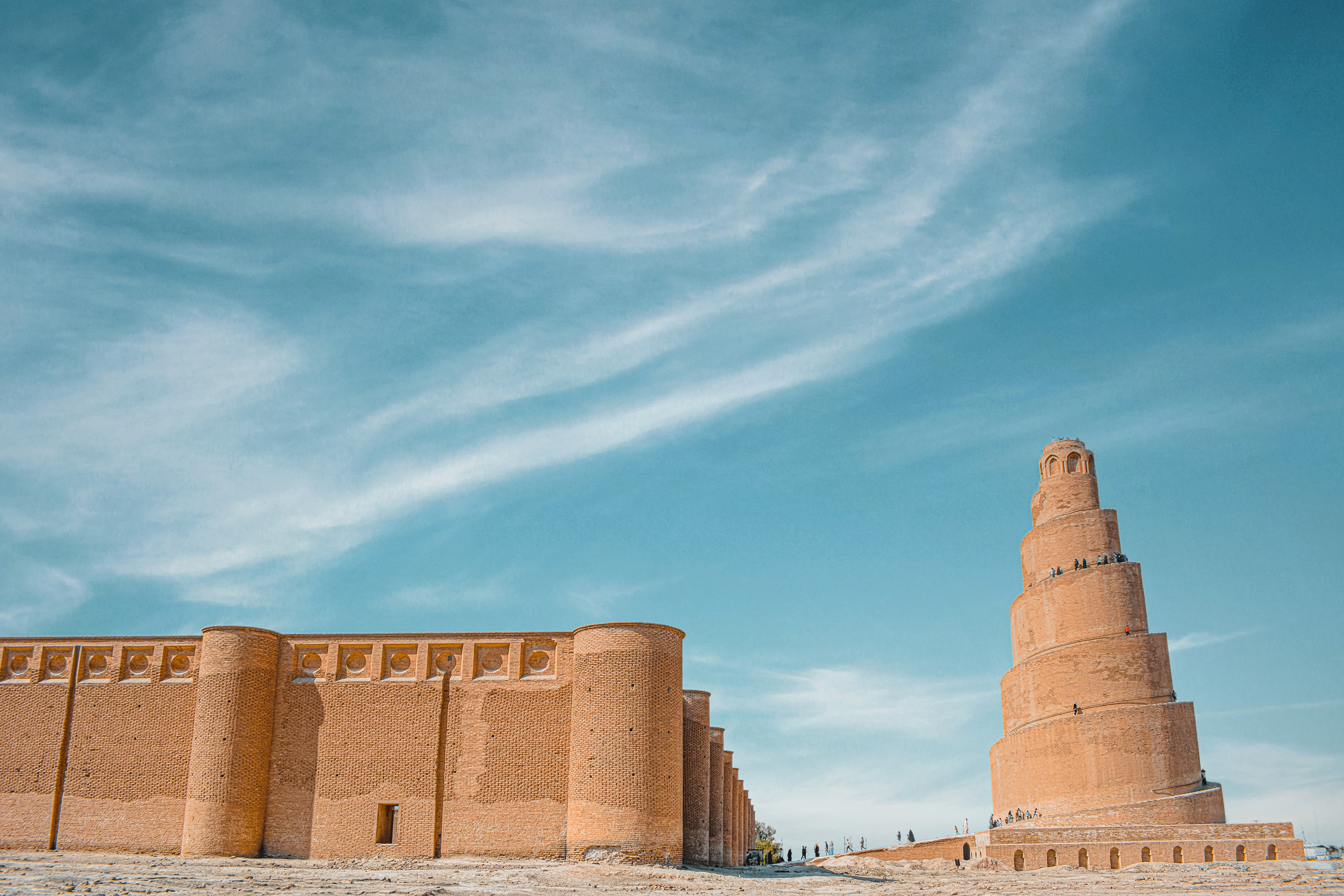
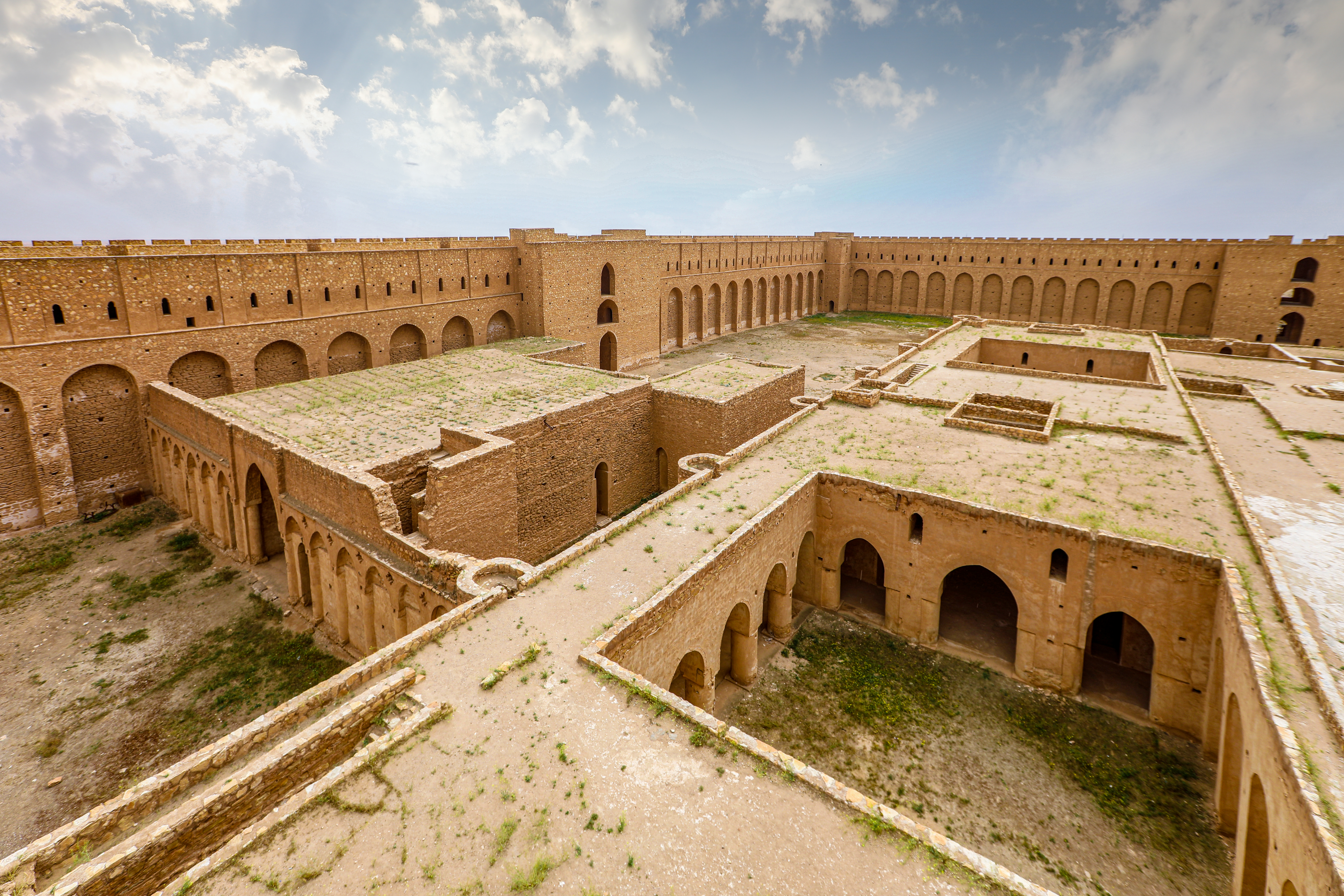
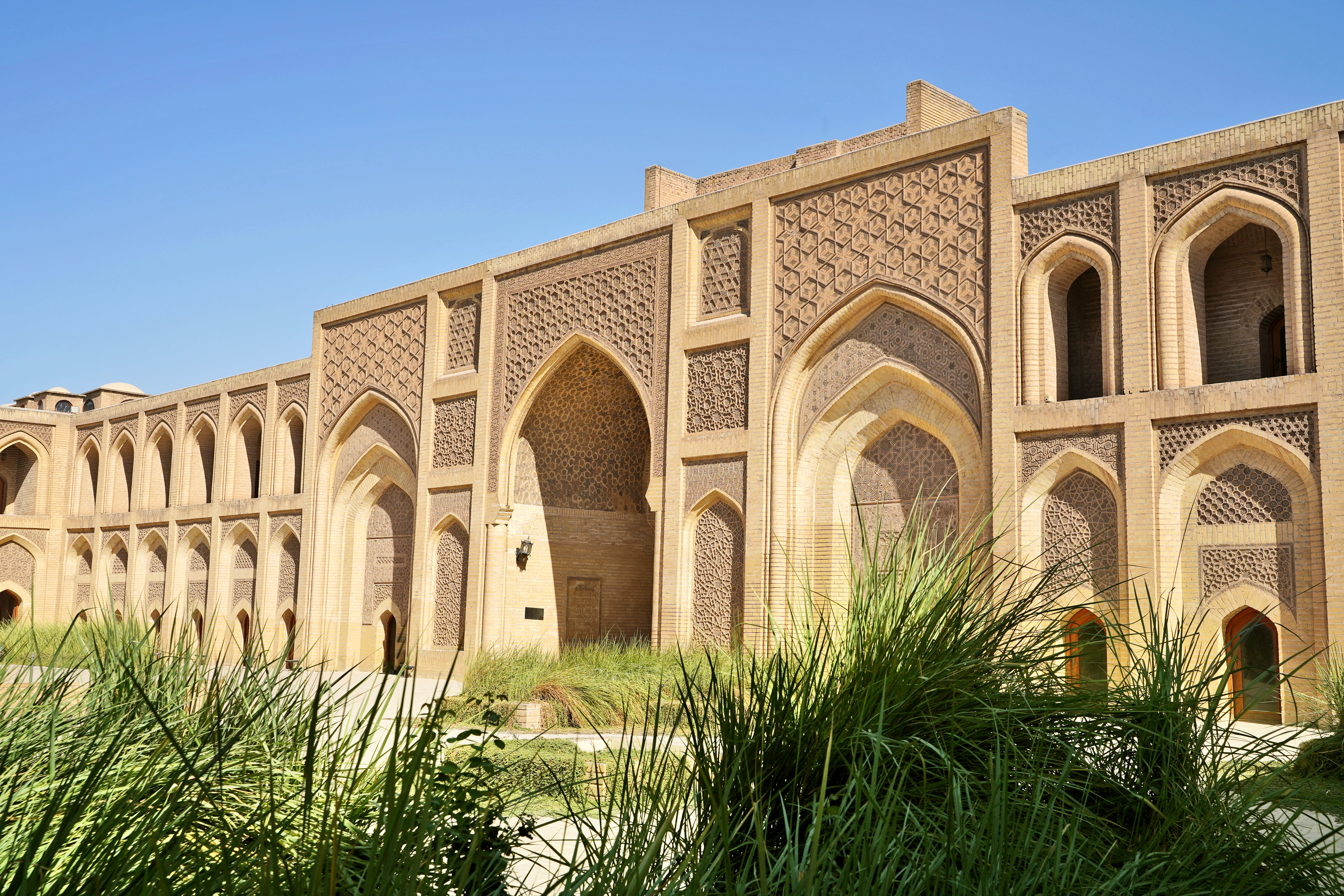
- Top:Great Mosque of Samarra (852); Middle: Al-Ukhaidir Fortress in Karbala (775); Bottom: Mustansiriyya Madrasa (1233)
- Years active: c. 750–1250s AD

Abbasid architecture developed in the Abbasid Caliphate (750 to 1258 CE), primarily in its heartland of Iraq. The great changes of the Abbasid era can be characterized as at the same time political, geo-political and cultural. The Abbasid period starts with the destruction of the Umayyad ruling family and its replacement by the Abbasids, and the position of power is shifted to the Mesopotamian area. As a result, there was a corresponding displacement of the influence of classical and Byzantine artistic and cultural standards in favor of local Mesopotamian models as well as Persian. The Abbasids evolved distinctive styles of their own, particularly in decoration. This occurred mainly during the period corresponding with their power and prosperity between 750 and 932.

Abbasid architecture was an important formative stage in wider Islamic architecture. The early caliphate's great power and unity allowed architectural features and innovations, such as minarets and carved stucco motifs, to spread quickly across the vast territories under its control. One of the most important architectural activities during this time was the construction of new capital cities or administrative centers (a tradition also continued from earlier Mesopotamian and Persian rulers), such as the Round City of Baghdad, founded in 762, and Samarra, founded in 836. The Abbasids favored mud brick and baked brick for construction, allowing for enormous architectural complexes to be built at relatively low cost, as most clearly exemplified by Samarra, which was made up of vast palaces and monumental mosques spread across some 40 km (25 mi).

While the Abbasids lost control of large parts of their empire after 870, their architecture continued to be copied by successor states in Iraq, Iran, Egypt and North Africa. Later Abbasid caliphs were confined to Baghdad and were less involved in public architectural patronage, which was instead dominated by the Seljuks and other rulers who held de facto political power. As a result, during the 11th to 13th centuries it was difficult to differentiate architectural forms associated with the Abbasids and those associated with other dynasties, and Abbasid architecture of the 12th and 13th centuries was essentially Seljuk architecture built with local Iraqi craftsmanship. Much of Abbasid art and architecture has been lost over time due to the fragile nature of the materials used and due to destruction wrought by conflicts. Very little of Abbasid-era Baghdad, the urban heart of the caliphate, has survived.

== Historical background ==
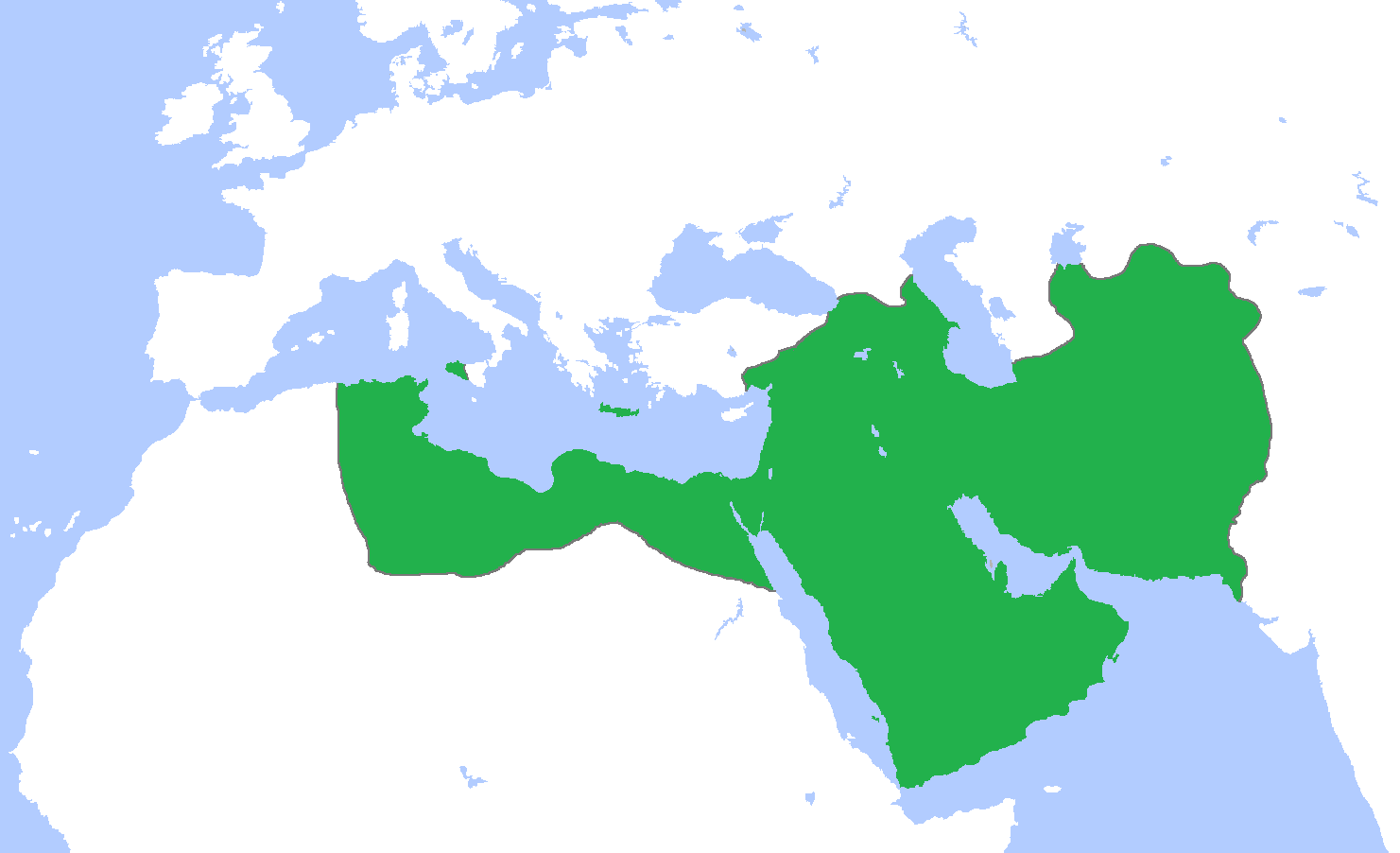
Abbasid Caliphate at its greatest extent, around 850

In 750, the Abbasids seized power from the Umayyad rulers of the Arab-Islamic empire. The Abbasid caliphs based themselves in Iraq and ruled over Iran, Mesopotamia, Arabia and the lands of the eastern and southern Mediterranean. The period between 750 and 900 has been described as the Islamic Golden Age. During the Umayyad period, Muslims had largely re-used pre-Islamic buildings in the cities they conquered, but by the Abbasid era many of these structures required replacement. The spread of Islam and the growing Muslim population had also brought changes in needs. Under the Abbasids, new constructions included not only larger mosques and palaces, but also fortifications, new types of houses, commercial buildings and even recreational facilities for racing and polo matches. They upgraded the pilgrim road from Baghdad and Kufa to Mecca, clearing obstacles, adding walls and drainage ditches in some areas, and built stations for the pilgrims with rooms, a water reservoir, and a mosque.

In 762, the caliph al-Mansur founded the new capital of Baghdad on the Tigris, which soon grew to one of the largest cities in the world. In 836, the caliph al-Mu'tasim transferred the capital to Samarra. The Abbasids began to lose control over the outlying parts of the empire, with local dynasties gaining effective independence in Khorasan (Samanids) in eastern Iran, Egypt (Tulunids) and Ifriqiya (Aghlabids). The caliph al-Mu'tamid, by now the effective ruler only of Iraq, moved his capital back to Baghdad in 889. In 945 the Buyids, followers of Shia Islam, became effective rulers as amirs, while the Abbasid caliphs retained their nominal title. After 1055, the Seljuks controlled Baghdad for the next century and posed as the protectors of the caliphs.

With the long reign of Caliph al-Nasir (r. 1180–1225), coinciding with the Seljuk decline and other factors, the Abbasids once again gained control of Iraq and enjoyed a limited revival. His successor, al-Mustansir (r. 1226–1242), is known for his architectural patronage. The sack of Baghdad by the Mongols in 1258, during the reign of al-Musta'sim, brought the Abbasid Caliphate to an end. The destruction wrought by this conflict, along with the relative fragility of building materials vulnerable to environmental damage and the later changes to the city's structure, has contributed to the loss of most of Abbasid-era Baghdad's architecture, with few exceptions.

== Origins ==
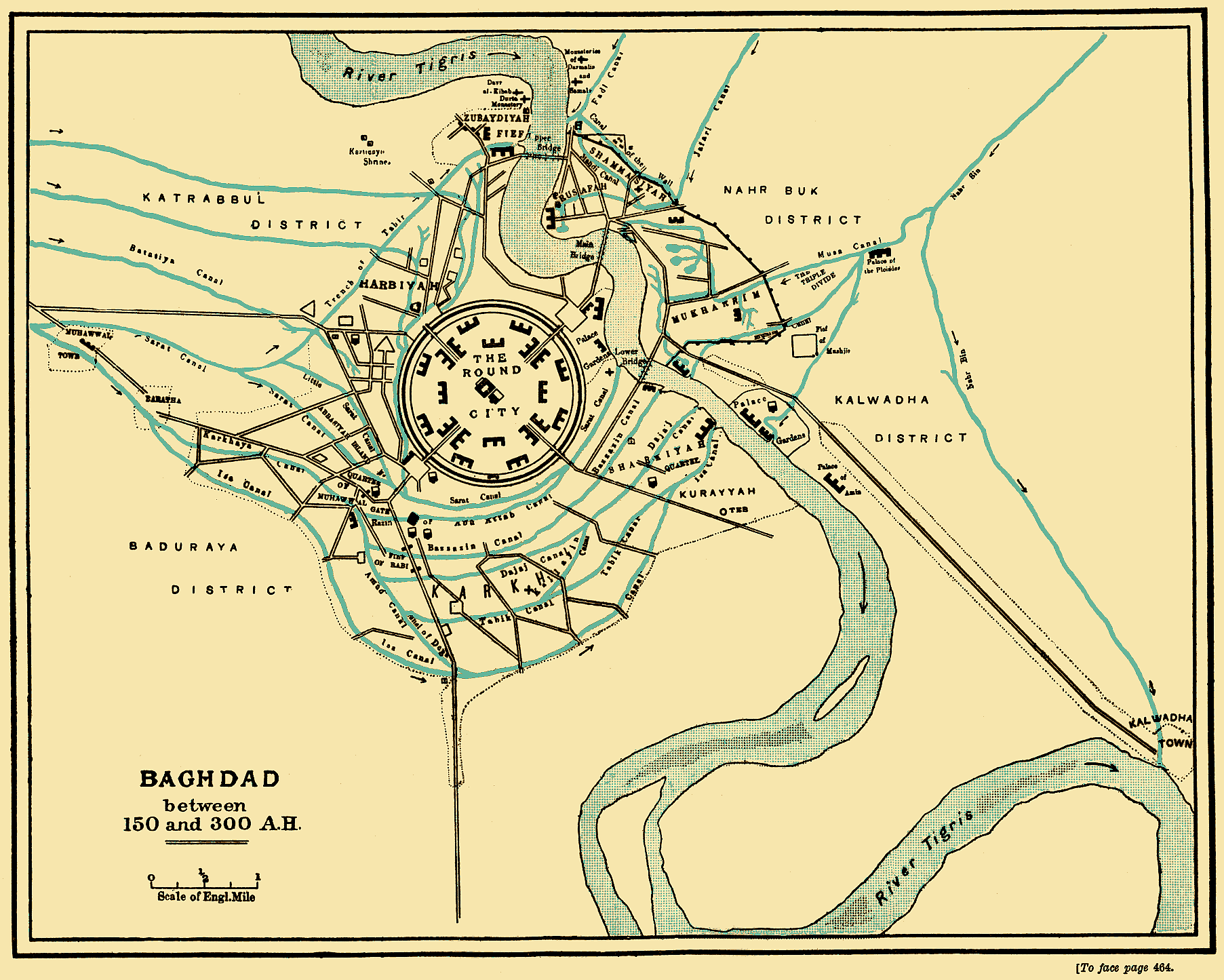
The city of Baghdad between 767 and 912 AD, growing out from the Round city of Baghdad built by the caliph al-Mansur. The original round city was built after the plan of circular Sasanian cities, such as Gur.

Early Abbasid architecture was strongly influenced by the architecture of the earlier Assyrian, Babylonian and Sassanid empires, as exemplified by the Palace of Ukhaidhir. The former Sassanid capital had been Ctesiphon in Iraq and Sasanian architecture was a heritage shared by both the Mesopotamian lowlands and the Iranian plateau, in addition to the heritage of ancient Mesopotamian architecture present in Iraq. The Abbasids used the same techniques, such as vaulting made without centring, similar design features, such as buttress towers, and the same materials, such as mud brick, baked brick and rough stone blocks set in mortar. The Abbasid royal cities were inspired by earlier ancient cities from the region, such as Dur-Sharrukin built by Sargon II of Assyria (722–705 BC), when the caliph al-Mansur built the round city of Baghdad, called Madinat al-Salam, he may have been influenced by the round city of Gur built by Ardashir I (r. 224–241) at Firuzabad. It contained the caliphal palace, a Great Mosque and administrative buildings. The design of central courtyards, a hallmark of Assyrian architecture, was integrated into Abbasid buildings, reflecting continuity in spatial organization.

With the conquest of Central Asia, the influence of Soghdian architecture increased. In Samarra the stucco and wall paintings are similar to that of the palaces of Panjakent in what is now Tajikistan. Later, in the 12th and 13th centuries, architecture in the lands ruled by the Abbasids became dominated by Seljuk architecture.

== Innovations ==
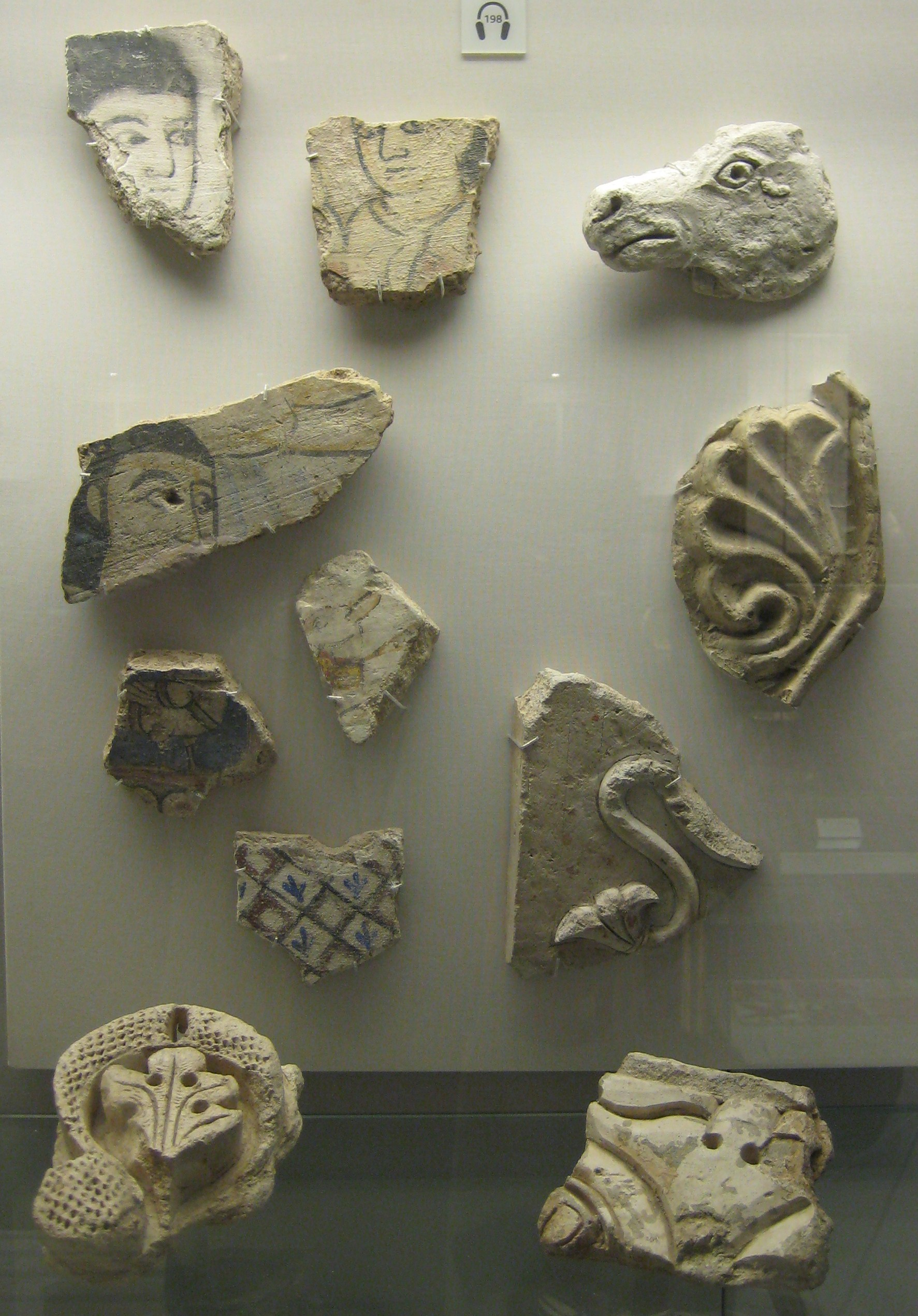
Fragments of stucco from Samarra, including paintings, carvings and abstract patterns

Abbasid cities were laid out on huge sites. The palaces and mosques of Samarra sprawled along the shores of the Tigris for 40 kilometres (25 mi). To match the scale of the sites, monumental buildings were erected, such as the huge spiral minarets of the Abu Dulaf Mosque and the Great Mosque of Samarra, which had no counterparts elsewhere. While the origins of the minaret are still uncertain, these and several other early 9th-century minarets built within the Abbasid territories are the first true minarets in Islamic architecture. The two-centered pointed arch and vault had appeared before the Abbasids took power, but became standard in Abbasid architecture, with the point becoming more prominent. The first fully developed example of the four-centered pointed arch was at the Qasr al-'Ashiq, built by caliph al-Mut'amid sometime between 870 and 883.

Three new types of stucco decoration were developed in Samarra and rapidly became popular elsewhere. The first two styles may be seen as derivative from late antique or Umayyad decorative styles, but the third is entirely new. Style C used molds to create repeating patterns of curved lines, notches, slits, and other elements. The fluid designs make no use of traditional vegetal, geometric or animal themes. The stucco work was sometimes colored in red or blue, and sometimes incorporated a glass mosaic. The patterns cut into the stucco surface at an angle. This is the first and purest example of the arabesque. It may represent a deliberate attempt to make an abstract form of decoration that avoids depiction of living things, and this may explain its rapid adoption throughout the Muslim world.

The layout of the Fatimid city of al-Mansuriya in Ifriqiya founded in 946 was circular, perhaps in imitation of Baghdad. The choice of layout may have been a deliberate challenge to the Abbasid Caliphate. The Fatimid architecture of Ifriqiya and Egypt followed Abbasid styles, as shown by the Great Mosque of Mahdiya and the Azhar Mosque in Cairo. Even Umayyad buildings of the Iberian peninsula show Abbasid influence.

== Characteristics ==
=== General ===
Typical features of early Abbasid architecture included the use of brick vaulting and stucco decoration. Barrel vaulting, which had already been in use in Umayyad architecture and earlier, was widely employed for formal spaces like reception halls. As mentioned above, the two-centered pointed arch became common in the early Abbasid period, followed by the introduction of the four-centered pointed arch at Samarra. Physical geography also influenced local architecture. Stone was rare in the alluvial plains of central and southern Iraq, which encouraged the use of mud brick, faced with plaster, as construction materials, with fire brick also used at times. In turn, these materials required regular maintenance and restoration. The flatness and openness of the land also made it possible to build on an unprecedentedly vast scale, which the early caliphs frequently did, as exemplified by the new administrative capitals they created. Abbasid architecture had foliate decorations on arches, pendant vaults, muqarnas vaults and polychrome interlaced spandrels that became identified as typical of "Islamic" architecture, although these forms may have their origins in Sassanian architecture. Thus the fronting arch of the Arch of Ctesiphon was once decorated with a lobed molding, a form copied in the Palace of al-Ukhaidir.

=== Palaces ===
==== Early palaces ====
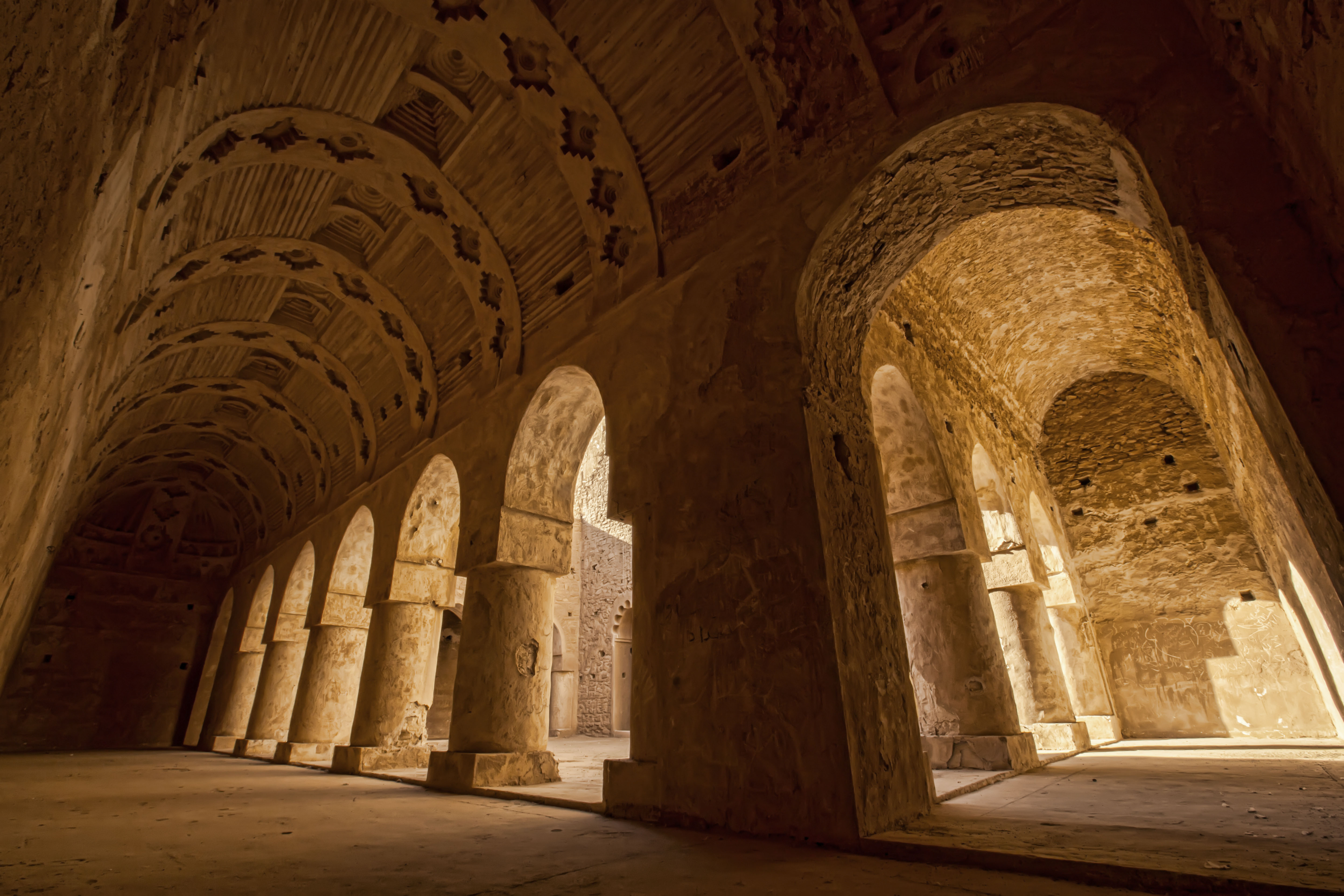
Vaulted corridors around a courtyard in the al-Ukhaidir Palace (c. 775) in Iraq, one of the earliest surviving examples of Abbasid architecture

The earliest surviving Abbasid palace, built around 775, is the al-Ukhaidir Palace. It has a plan derived from earlier Sasanian and Umayyad palaces. The palace lies in the desert about 180 kilometres (110 mi) to the south of Baghdad. It is rectangular in shape, 175 by 169 metres (574 by 554 ft), with four gates. Three are in half-round towers that protrude from the wall, and one in a rectangular recess in the wall. Inside there is a vaulted entrance hall, a central court, an iwan (hall) open to the court opposite the entrance hall, and residential units. Sasanian techniques persist in the construction of vaults with pointed curves using rubble and mortar faced with brick and stucco, blind arches as decorations for large wall surfaces, and long vaulted halls with recesses behind arches supported by heavy pillars. Verbal descriptions indicate that palaces in Baghdad had similar layout, although on a larger scale.

In 772 Al-Mansur founded a new city called al-Rafiqa on the Euphrates, the site of present-day Raqqa. The city was laid out in the shape of a horseshoe and reportedly copied the Round City of Baghdad. Later, Harun al-Rashid made the city his capital during the later years of his reign and built his residence here between 796 and 808. Some of its remains have been excavated, revealing buildings with spacious floor plans similar to other parts of Mesopotamia but lacking the use of iwans. The Baghdad Gate, one of the few old monuments preserved in Raqqa today, was once thought to date from al-Mansur's foundation in the late 8th century, but it has since been attributed to the 11th or 12th century instead, around the time of Numayrid or Zengid rule.

==== Samarra palaces ====
The palaces of Samarra, founded by al-Mu'tasim in 836, were notable for their enormous size and their well-defined subdivisions. They included vast courtyards around which numerous apartments and halls were arranged. Some of the palaces had multiple monumental gates, arranged in succession, which granted access from one courtyard to another. The main reception palaces often have a domed central chamber surrounded by four iwans facing outward. The walls were made of rammed earth, mud-brick with gypsum mortar, or fired brick. Floors were sometimes of marble but more often tiled. Reception rooms had carved or molded stucco dados decorating the lower part of the walls, while stucco also decorated door frames, wall-niches and arches. Some palaces, such as al-'Ashiq and al-Jiss, built around 870, display polylobed moldings carved deeply into the intrados of the arches, giving the appearance of a foliate arch. The other extensive facilities of Samarra included barracks, stables and racecourses.

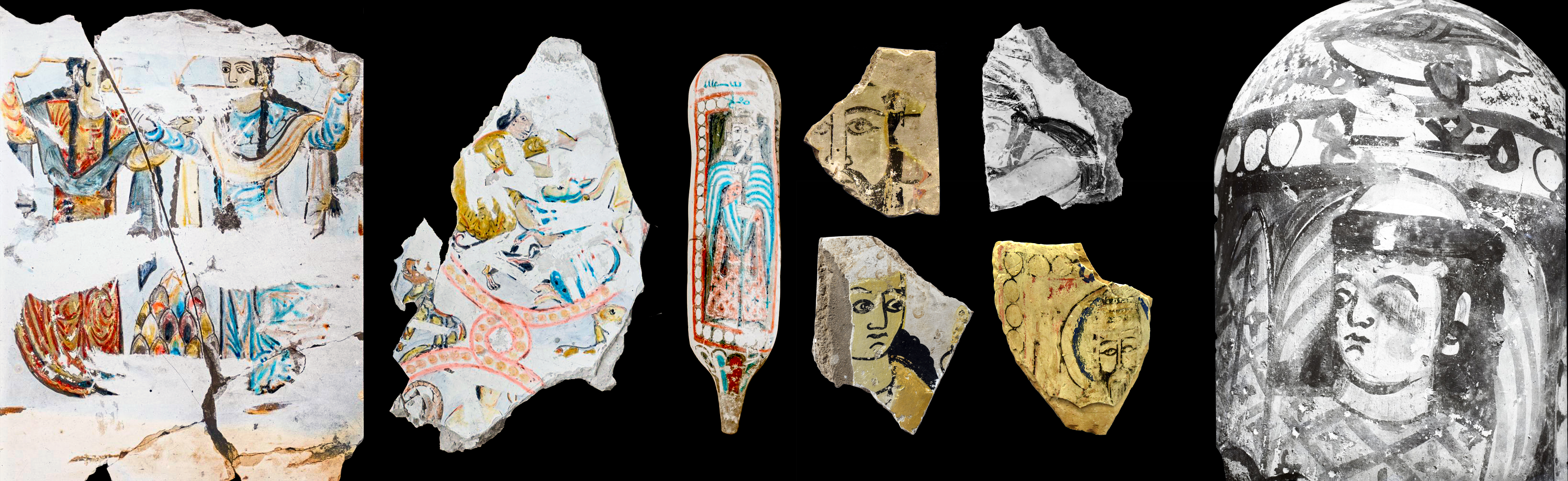
Fragments of wall frescos from the Dar al-Khilafa in Samarra

Al-Mu'tasim's main palace, known as the Dār al-Khilāfa or the Jawsaq al-Khāqānī, was begun around the same time as the city's foundation. On its west side was a grand entrance overlooking the Tigris River. It consisted of a grand staircase leading up to a monumental gate in the form of a three iwans, known as Bab al-'Amma. At the foot of the staircase was a large rectangular water basin from which a canal led down to a raised pavilion near the river, 300 meters away from the gate. The gate itself had a second story from which the caliph, the palace residents, or the guards were able to survey the landscape. Behind the gate, a series of halls led eastward to a square courtyard. Beyond this was a domed hall with four iwans arranged in a cruciform layout, with each iwan granting access to another courtyard behind it. The eastern courtyard beyond this was a vast esplanade measuring 350 by 180 metres (1,150 by 590 ft) which had water channels, fountains, and possibly gardens. Among other excavated and partly reconstructed features visible today is a sunken courtyard with chambers constructed around a large circular water basin, the so-called "Large Serdab" (as named by Ernst Herzfeld), also called by Iraqi archeologists the Birka Handasiyya ("Geometric Basin") or al-Birkah al-Da'iriyyah. The courtyard, located to the north of the grand esplanade, was probably designed to be a respite from the heat of summer.

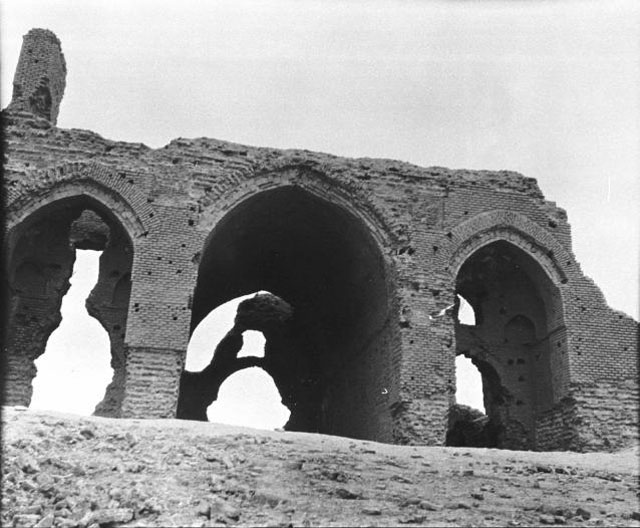
Remains of Bab al-'Amma (c. 836), the main gate of the Dār al-Khilāfa (or Jawsaq al-Khāqānī) palace in Samarra, Iraq, founded by Al-Mu῾tasim

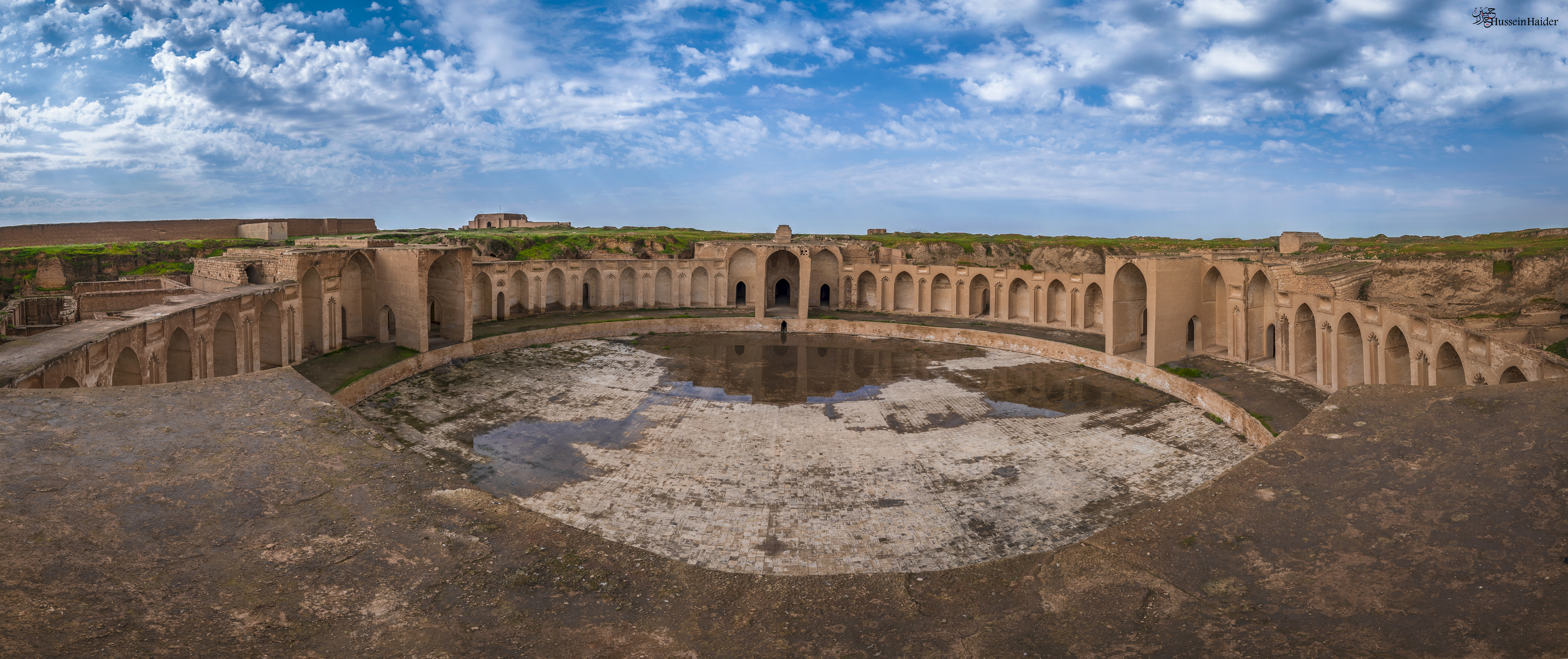
Remains (partly reconstructed) of the Large Serdab inside the Dār al-Khilāfa palace in Samarra (around or after 836)

Subsequent caliphs after al-Mu'tasim added their own palaces. In 859, al-Mutawakkil initiated construction of a new palace-city north of al-Mu'tasim's complex, known variably as al-Mutawakkiliyya, al-Ja'fariyya, or al-Mahuza. It overlooked the Tigris River and was even larger in scale than al-Mu'tasim's city, but it was abandoned after al-Mutawakkil's assassination in 861. Al-Mutawakkil built luxurious palaces for his sons, such as the Balkuwara Palace for his son al-Mu'tazz, which had a style and layout similar to the Dar al-Khilafa. It was located southeast of Samarra.

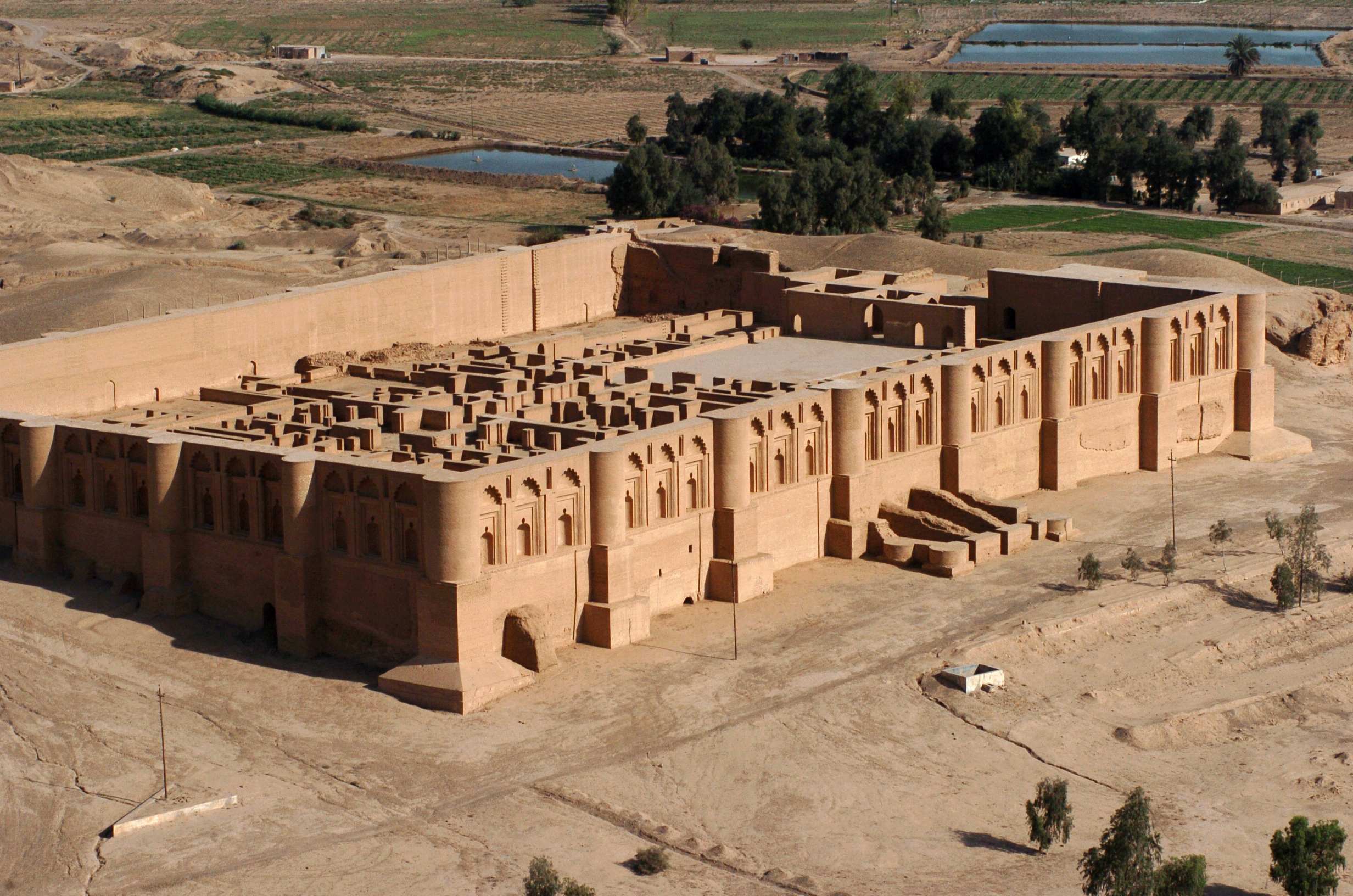
The central structure of Qasr al-'Ashiq, a palace built by al-Mu'tamid near Samarra between 870 and 882

Qasr al-'Ashiq was built by al-Mut'amid sometime between 870 and 883. It is the best-preserved of all the Samarran palaces, as it preserves substantial parts of its original brick walls. It consists of a large central structure which is elevated on an artificial platform and surrounded by an outer enclosure. The central structure is rectangular in plan except for an additional rectangular extension on its north side. Internally, its rooms were organized around the concept of a T-shaped iwan, but this floor plan was subsequently modified many times by later occupants, who subdivided the existing spaces into smaller rooms.

=== Mosques ===
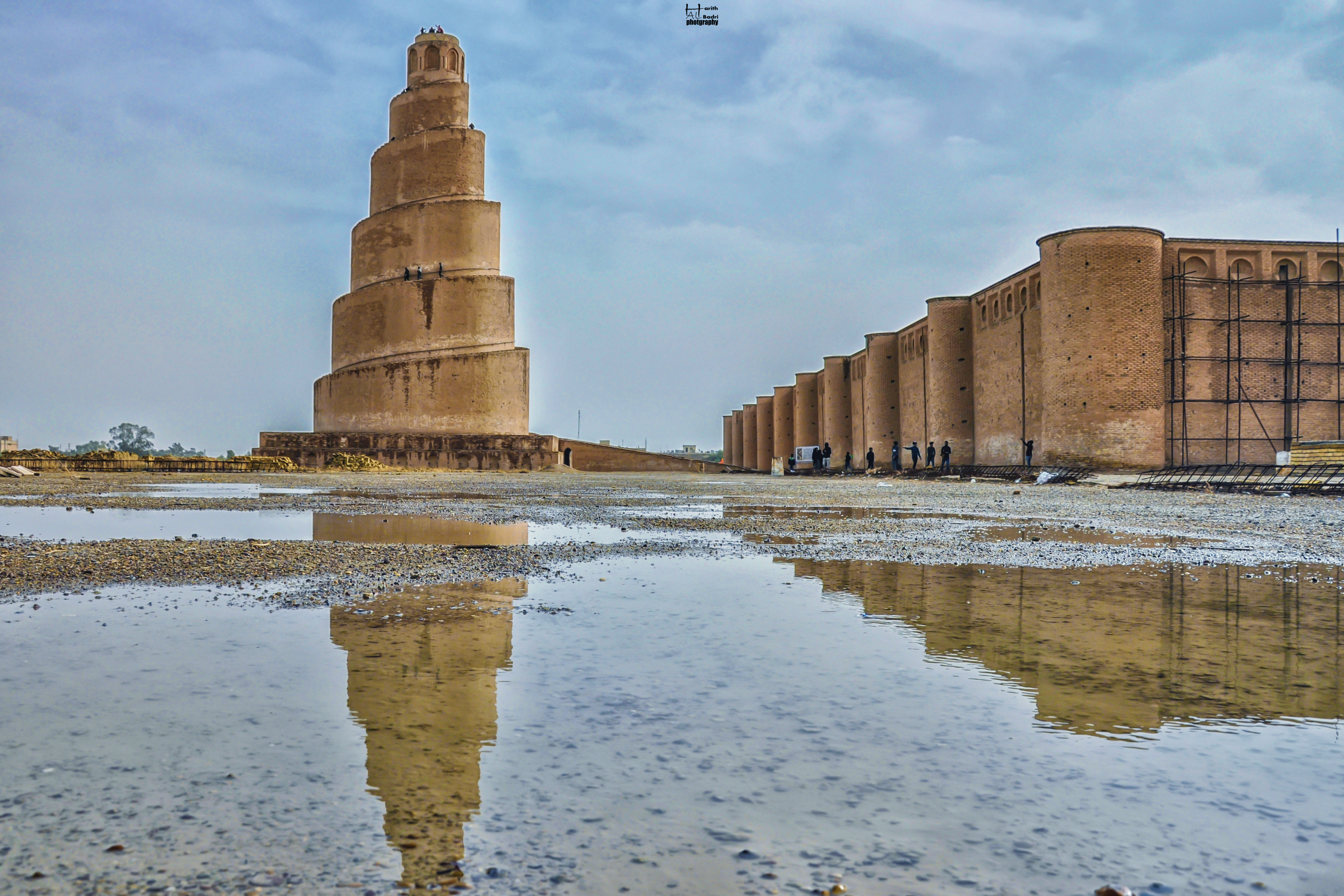
Great Mosque of Samarra, Iraq, built by al-Mutawakkil in 848–52; the outer wall of the mosque is on the right, the Malwiya minaret is on the left

The Abbasids continued to follow the Umayyad rectangular hypostyle plan with arcaded courtyard (sahn) and covered prayer hall. They built mosques on a monumental scale using brick construction, stucco ornament and architectural forms developed in Mesopotamia and other regions to the east. Massive rounded piers with smaller engaged columns were also typical in Abbasid mosques. The first Friday mosque of Baghdad was built by al-Mansur and expanded at a later period, but it has since disappeared and is now known only from texts. It had a hypostyle form with courtyard. The Great Mosque of Samarra (848–852) built by al-Mutawakkil had a rectangular floor plan measuring 256 by 139 metres (840 by 456 ft). It had a flat wooden roof was supported by columns and was decorated with marble panels and glass mosaics. The Abu Dulaf Mosque (859–861) near Samarra also had a rectangular floor plan, an open-air courtyard, and a prayer hall with arcades on rectangular brick piers running at right angles to the qibla wall.

Other surviving Abbasid mosques are the Mosque of Ibn Tulun in Cairo (877–879), the Tarikhaneh (or Tārī Khāna) in Damghan, Iran (750–789), and the Nuh Gunbad (Nine Dome) Mosque in Balkh, Afghanistan (9th century). These mosques all had hypostyle forms with internal courtyards. The Ibn Tulun Mosque is one of the best-preserved Abbasid mosques anywhere and one of the most impressive provincial mosques of this era. Its design is a product of the Samarra style being adapted by local craftsmanship, probably on the instructions of its patron, Ahmad Ibn Tulun, who had spent time in Samarra. It has a nearly square floor plan with a vast interior courtyard surrounded by roofed spaces with rectangular piers and pointed arches. The design of its arcades, in which carved decoration alternates with solid surfaces and the main arches alternate with smaller arched openings in the spandrels, forms a visual rhythmic effect that further exploits the potential of basic Abbasid design.

The Tarikhaneh mosque in Damghan, whose structure dates from the 9th century or the second half of the 8th century, is the only early Abbasid mosque in Iran to preserve much of its original form. The 10th-century the Friday Mosque of Nā'īn (also spelled Nain or Nayin), for its part, preserves some of the best Abbasid stucco decoration of its time, covering its pillars, arches, and mihrab. The Great Mosque of Isfahan was also first built during the Abbasid period, but little remains of this construction as it was rebuilt and expanded in later centuries. The mosque at Balkh was about 20 by 20 metres (66 by 66 ft) square, with three rows of three square bays, supporting nine vaulted domes. Other nine-domed mosques of this kind have been found in Spain, Tunisia, Egypt and Central Asia.

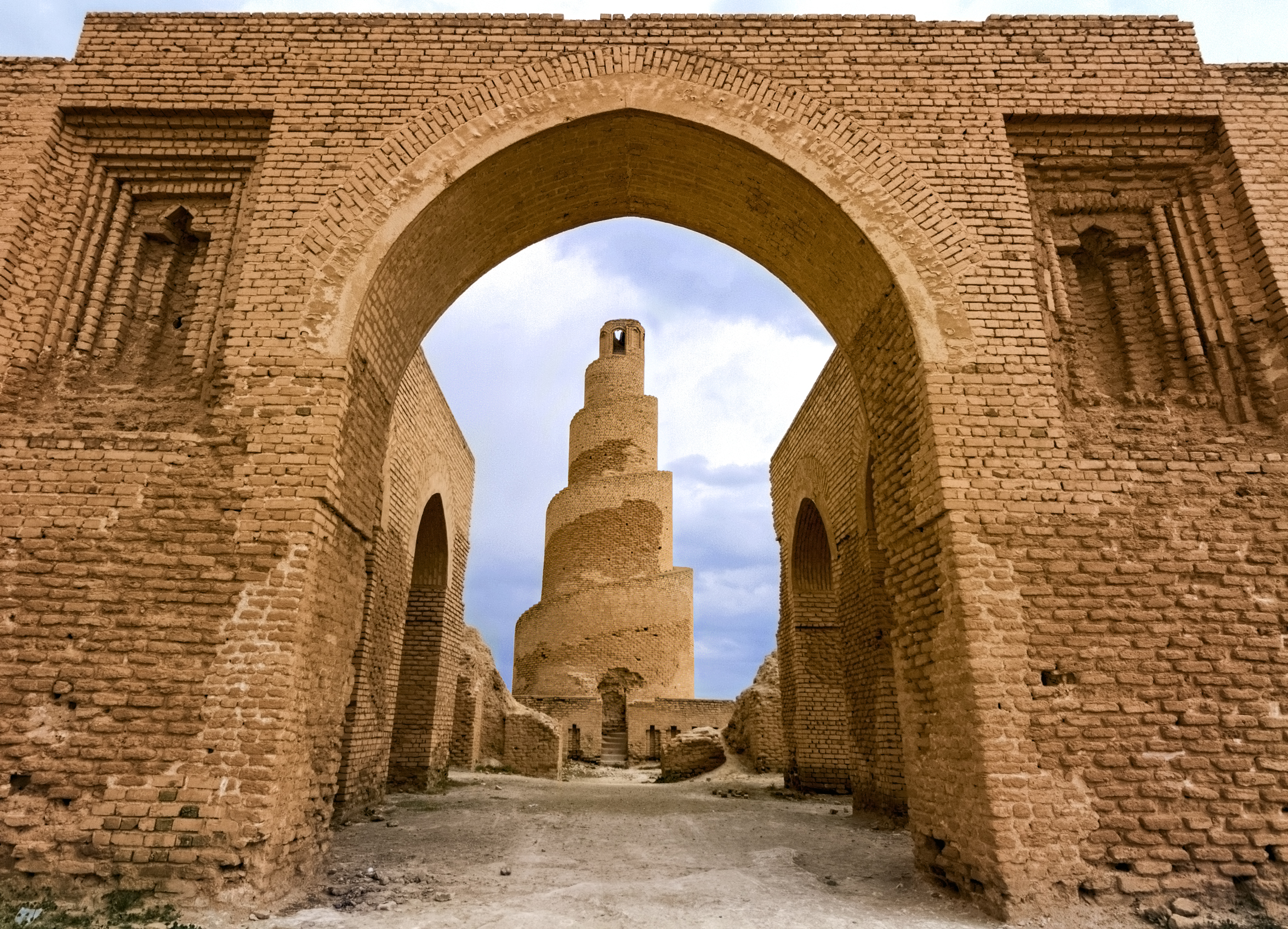
Abu Dulaf Mosque, approximately 15 kilometres (9.3 mi) north of Samarra, commissioned by Al-Mutawakkil in 859

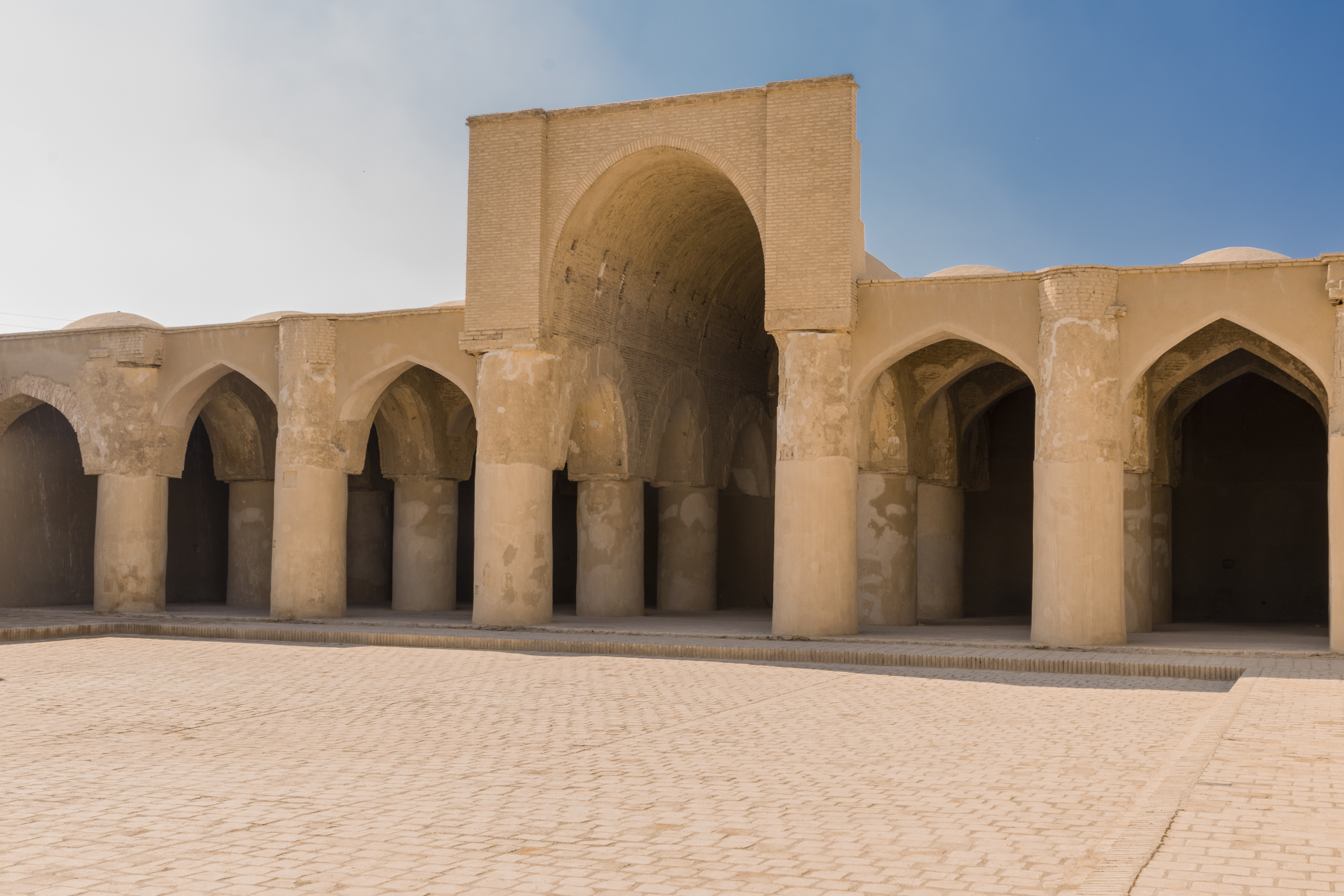
Friday Mosque of Damghan (2nd half of 8th century or 9th century)

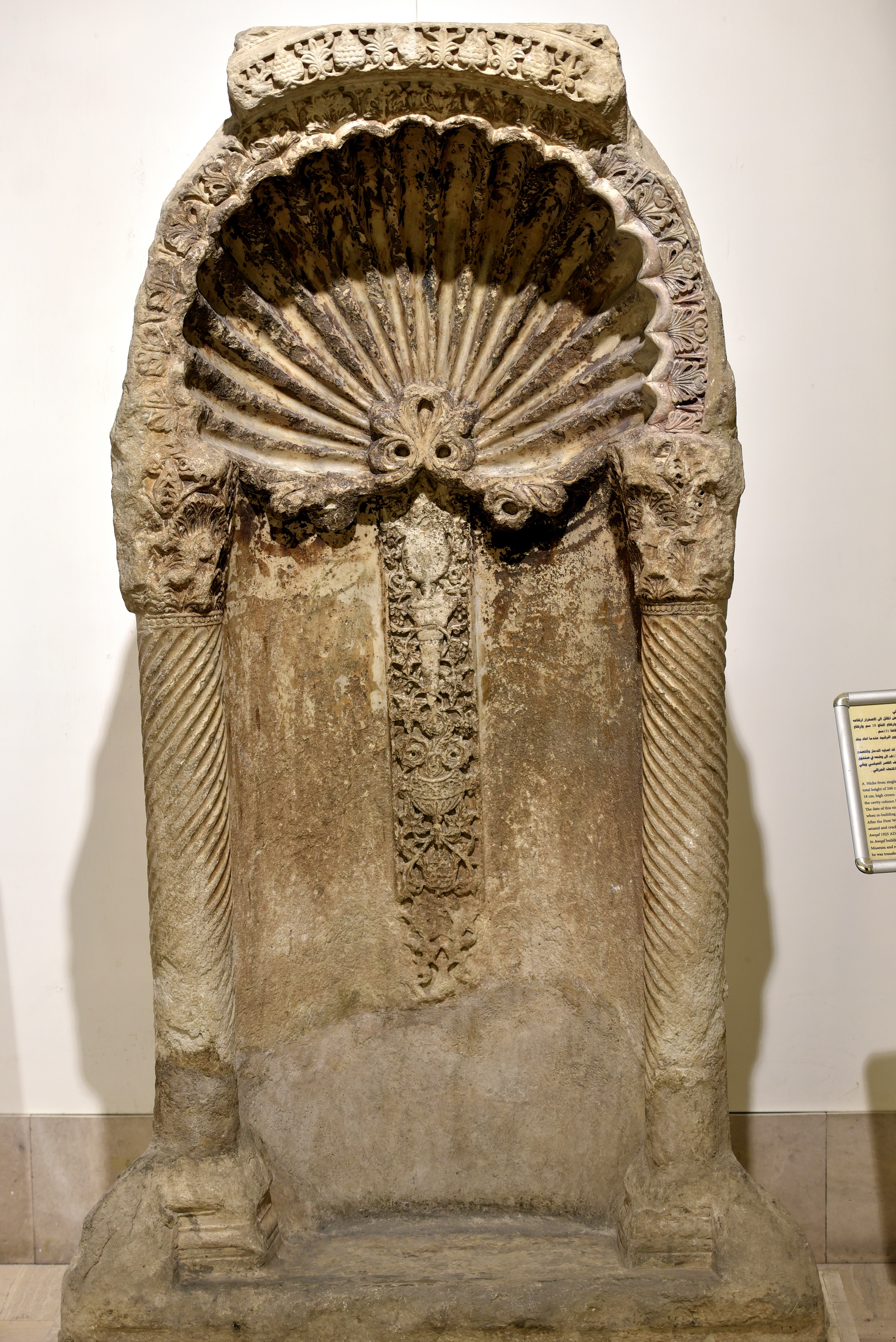
Mihrab originating from the non-extant Great Mosque of al-Mansur in Baghdad, now housed at the Iraq Museum

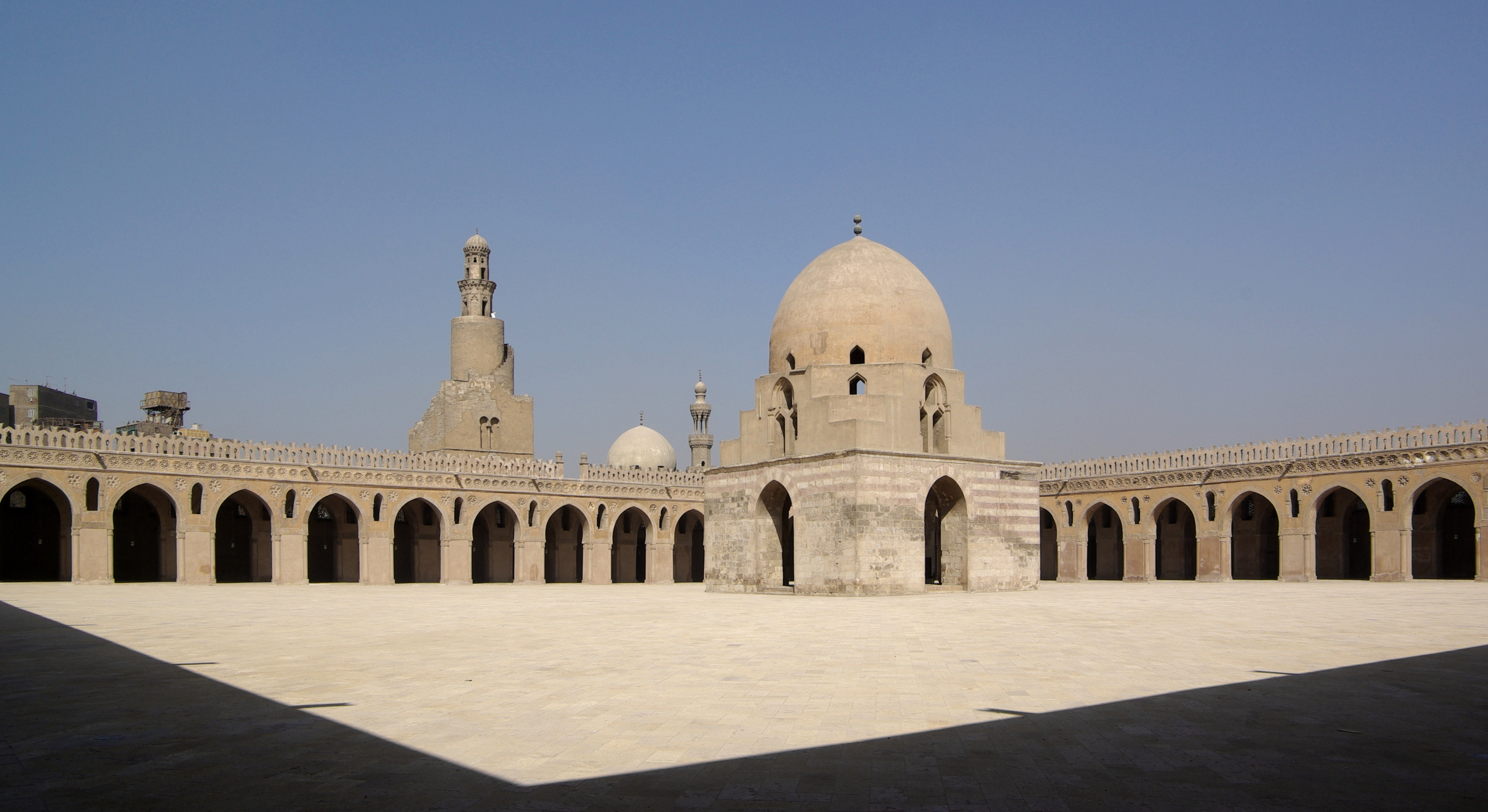
Mosque of Ibn Tulun (876–9) in Cairo is an example of Abbasid architecture built by the autonomous Abbasid governor Ahmad ibn Tulun

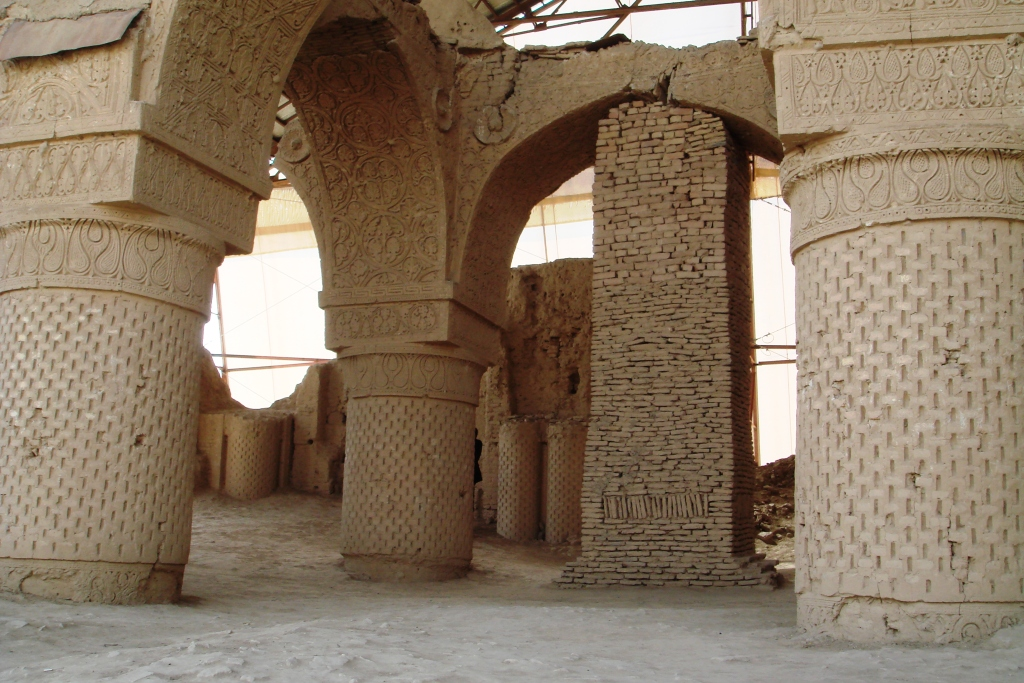
The Nine Dome Mosque in Balkh (9th century)

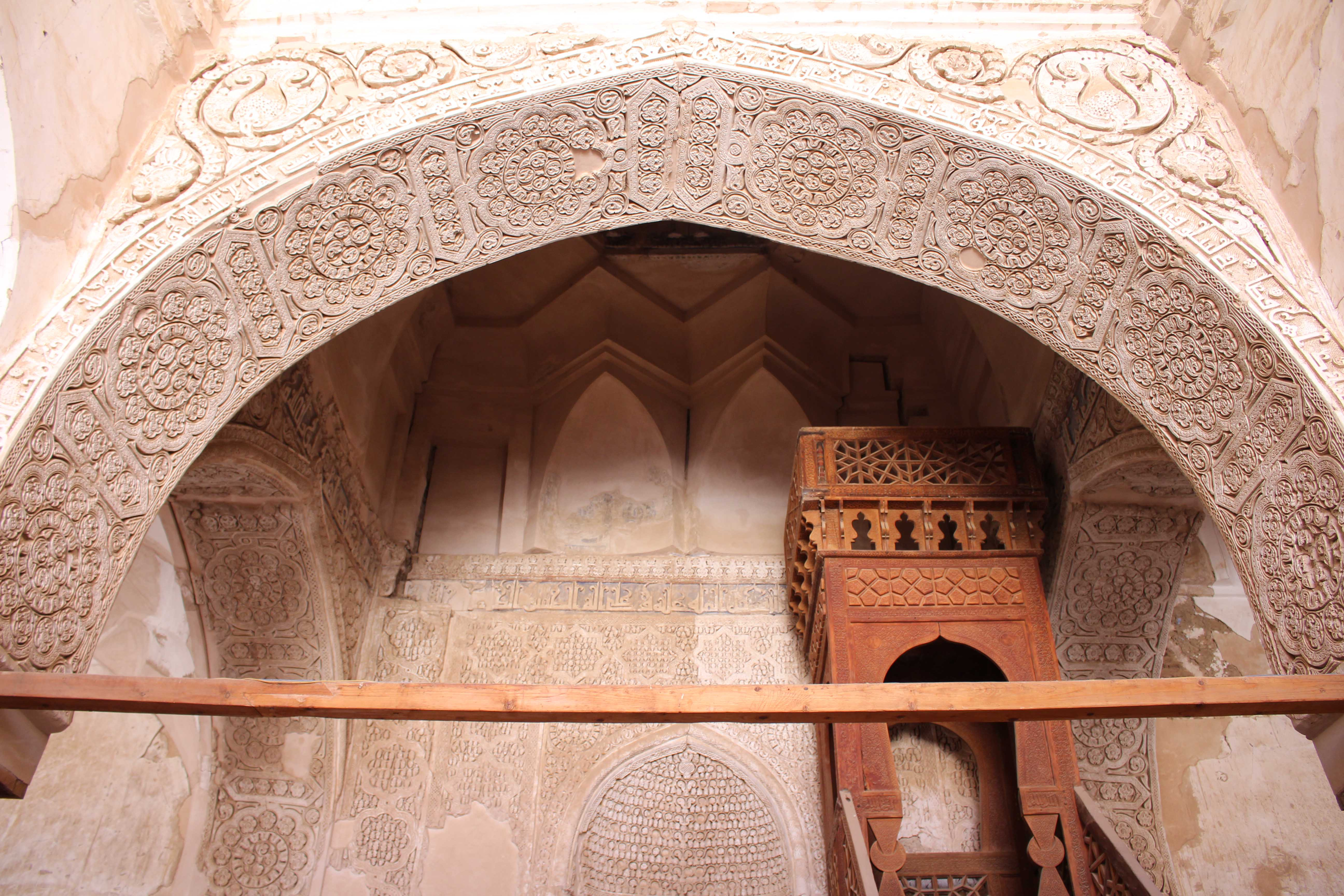
Stucco decoration near the mihrab of the Friday Mosque of Nain (10th century)

==== Minarets ====
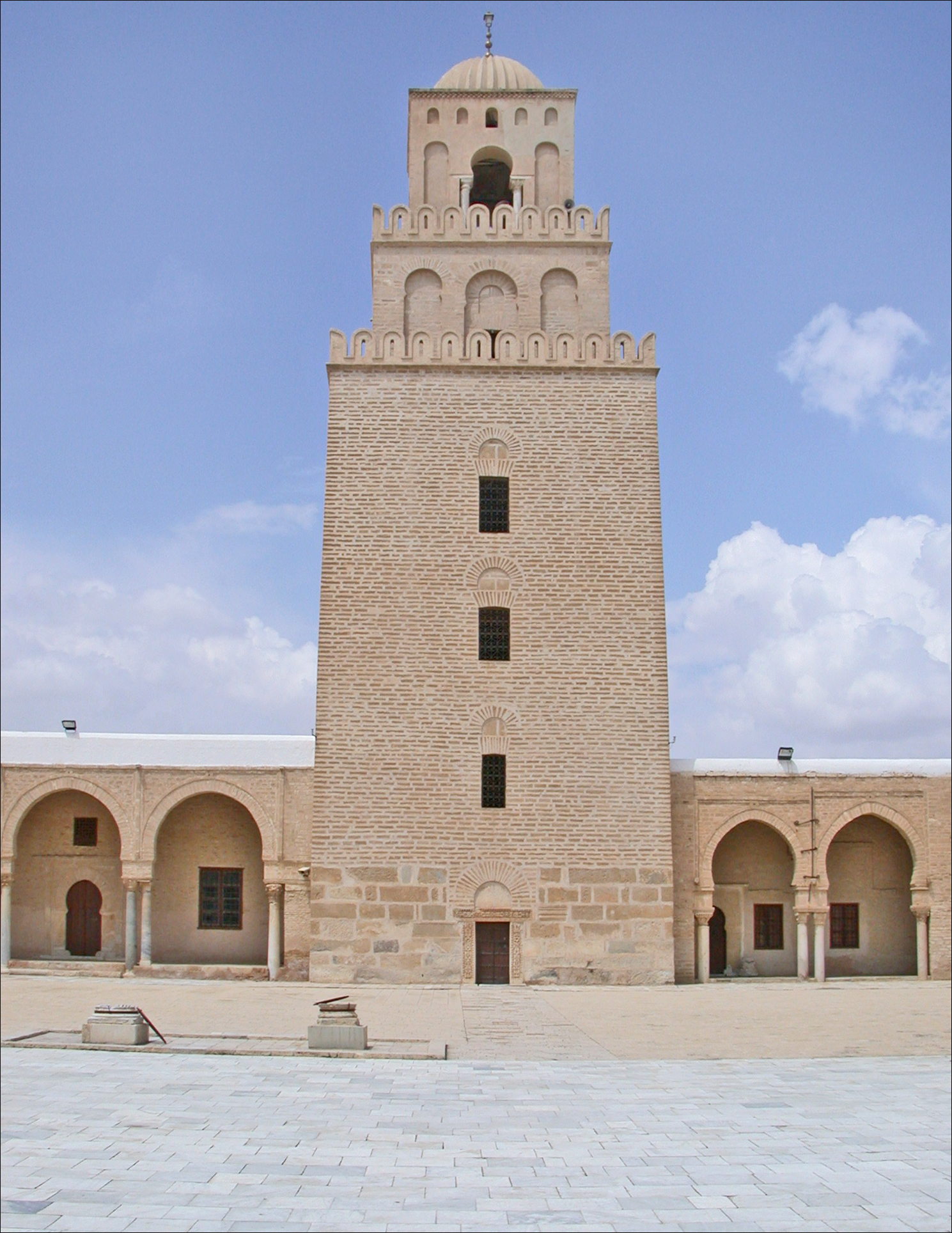
The minaret of the Great Mosque of Kairouan in Tunisia, built in 836 by the Aghlabids (vassals of the Abbasid Caliphs), is one of the oldest surviving minarets in the world.

The first known minarets built as towers appeared under Abbasid rule. Four towers were added to the Great Mosque of Mecca during its Abbasid reconstruction in the late 8th century. In the 9th century single minaret towers were built in or near the middle of the wall opposite the qibla wall of mosques. These towers were built across the empire in a height to width ratio of around 3:1. One of the oldest minarets still standing is that of the Great Mosque of Kairouan in Tunisia, built in 836 under Aghlabid rule and still well-preserved today. Other minarets that date from the same period, but less precisely dated, include the minaret of the Friday Mosque of Siraf, now the oldest minaret in Iran, and the minaret opposite the qibla wall at the Great Mosque of Damascus (known as the "Minaret of the Bride"), now the oldest minaret in the region of Syria (though its upper section was probably rebuilt multiple times).

In Samarra, the Great Mosque of Samarra features a massive helicoidal or "spiral" minaret behind its northern wall, known as the Malwiya. This unique design was repeated once more in the minaret of the nearby Abu Dulaf Mosque, but no other examples were built elsewhere. A possible exception is the minaret of the Mosque of Ibn Tulun, which has a spiral staircase that seems to imitate the minarets of Samarra (though the current structure was at least partly reconstructed in the late 13th century). It is the only example of a spiral minaret outside Iraq. Some early scholarly theories proposed that these helicoidal minarets were inspired by ancient Mesopotamian ziggurats, but this view has been challenged or rejected by some later scholars including Richard Ettinghausen, Oleg Grabar, and Jonathan Bloom.

=== Other buildings ===
Houses were often built in blocks. Most houses seem to have been two story. The lower level was often sunken into the ground for coolness, and had vaulted ceilings. The upper level had a timber ceiling and a flat terraced roof that provided living space in summer nights. Houses were built around courtyards, and had featureless exteriors, although they were often elaborately decorated inside. There are no traces of windcatchers, which later became common Islamic architectural features. Most of the houses had latrines and facilities for cold-water bathing.

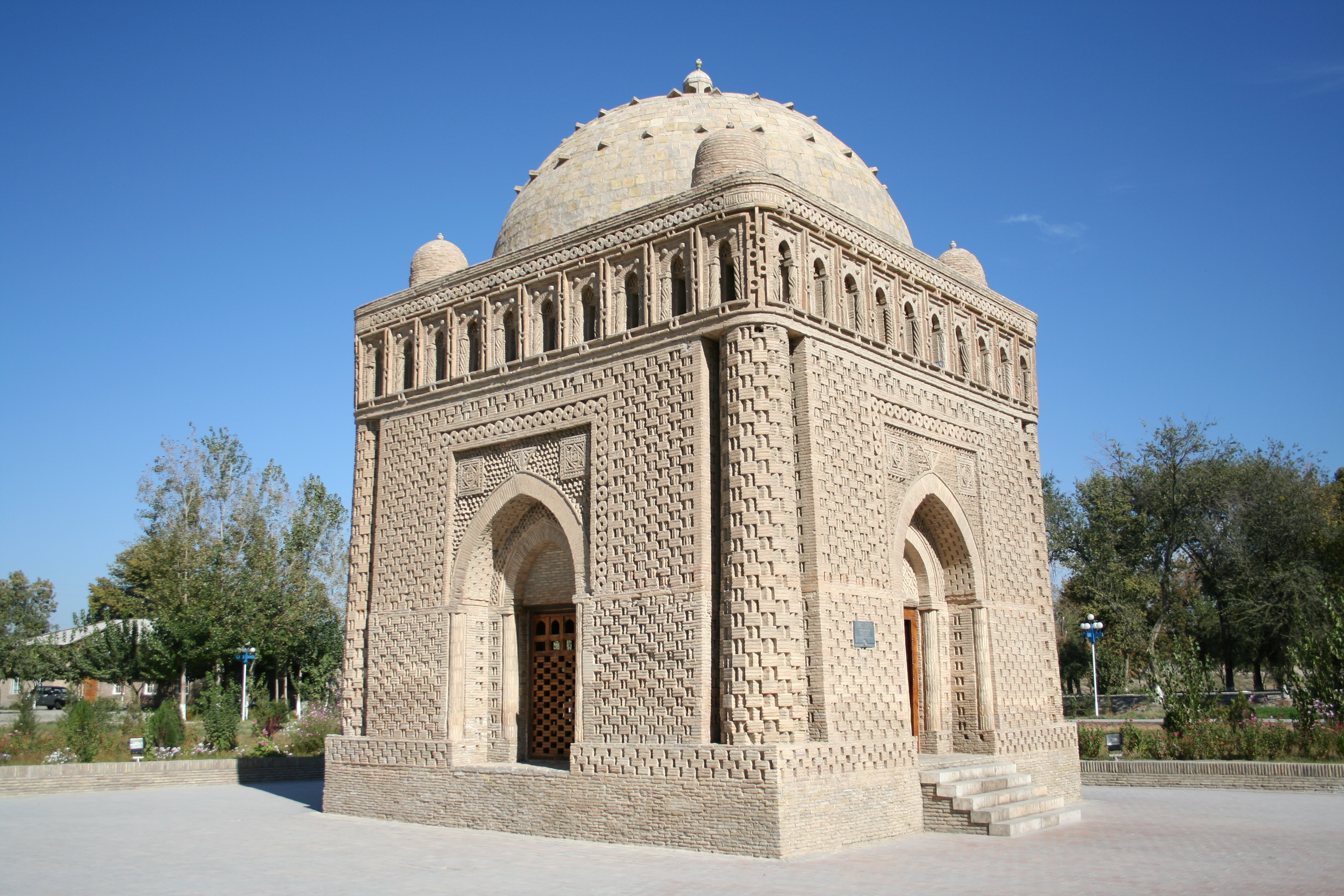
The Samanid Mausoleum in Bukhara (10th century), an early example of an Islamic domed mausoleum

The oldest surviving example of a domed tomb in Islamic architecture is the Qubbat al-Sulaibiyya in Samarra, present-day Iraq, dating from the mid-9th century (c. 862). It consists of an octagonal structure with a central square chamber covered by a dome. According to Ernst Herzfielf, who first documented the building in modern times, it was the mausoleum of Caliph al-Muntasir (d. 862), after which the caliphs al-Mu'tazz (d. 869) and al-Muhtadi (d. 870) were also buried here. The construction of domed tombs became more common among both Shi'as and Sunnis during the tenth century, although early Sunni mausoleums were mostly built for political rulers, whereas the Shi'as built them especially over the tombs of the Prophet Muhammad's descendants. Another important example of the latter is the Samanid Mausoleum in Bukhara, present-day Uzbekistan, built in the tenth century by the Samanids (one of the dynasties that ruled under Abbasid suzerainty). In the early 10th century the Abbasids also built another grand mausoleum for their dynasty on the east bank of the Tigris River in Baghdad, but it was later destroyed.

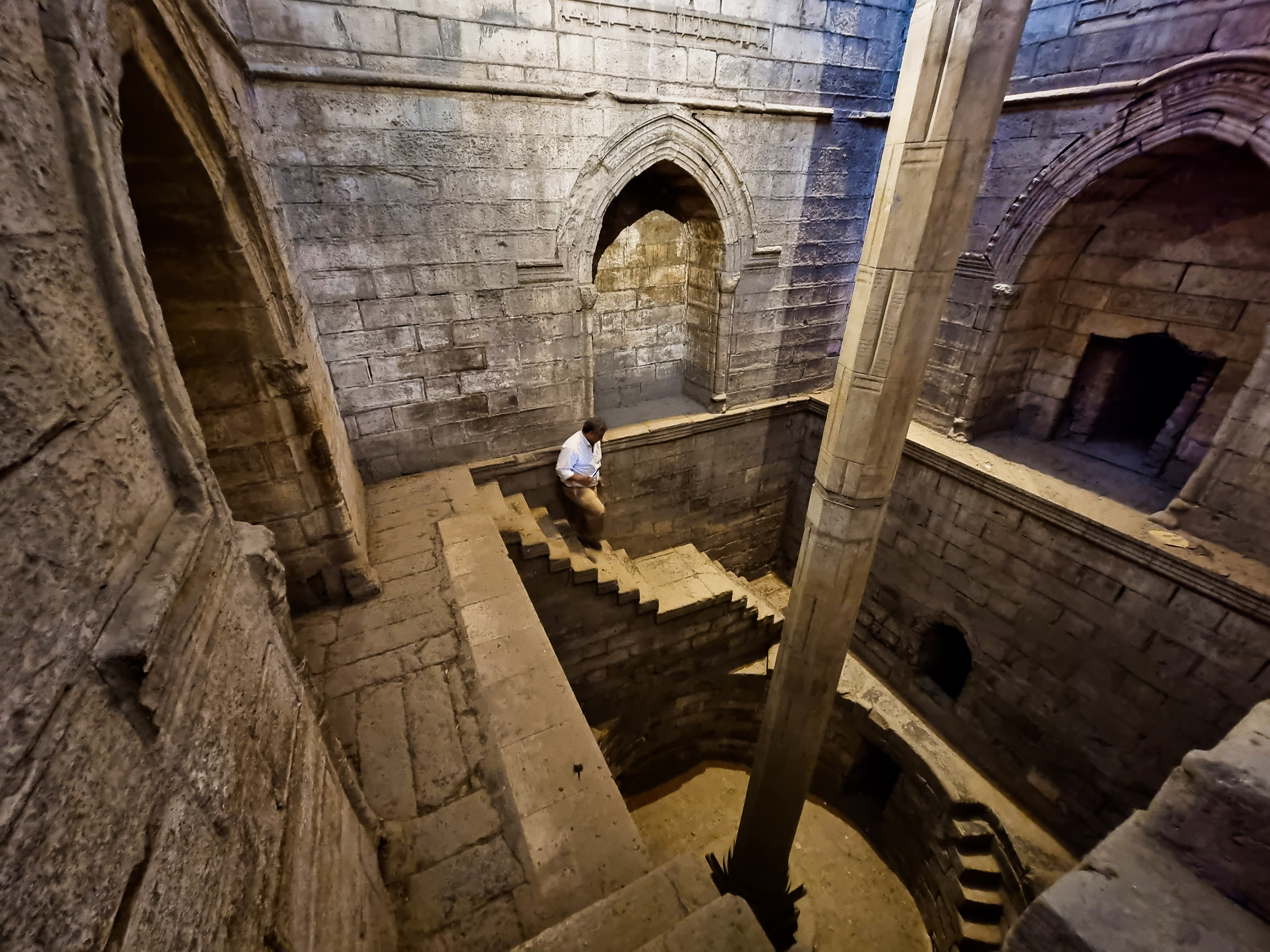
The Nilometer in Cairo, built in 861 by caliph al-Mutawakkil

The Abbasids also undertook public works that included construction of canals in Samarra and of cisterns in Tunisia and Palestine. The Nilometer of Fustat, in modern Cairo, was built by order of caliph al-Mutawakkil in 861 and consists of a man-made pit with stone walls that have discharging arches in a form identical to later Gothic pointed arches (which appeared in Europe about four hundred years later). It is the oldest surviving Islamic-era structure in Egypt. The stone walls are carved with inscriptions in Kufic script that contain excerpts from the Qur'an (Surah 14:37) as well as a foundation text in which the name of al-Mutawakkil was later erased.

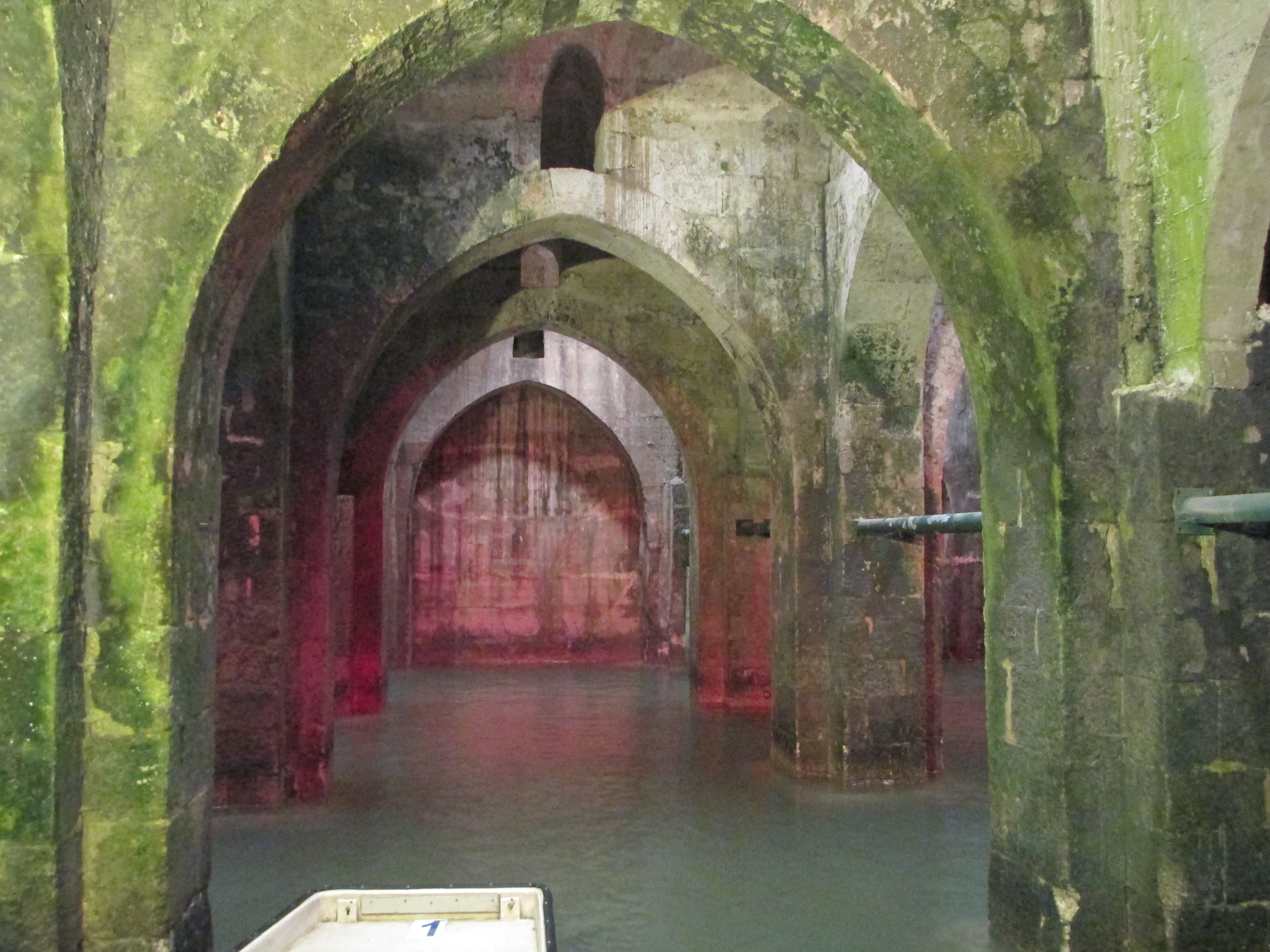
The Pool of Arches in Ramla, built in 789 by caliph Harun Al-Rashid

The Pool of the Arches in Ramla is a subterranean cisterns (water reservoirs) located near the White Mosque. It measures over 400 square metres (4,300 sq ft) in area and around 10 metres (33 ft) in height. The cistern was built by Harun al-Rashid in 789. It features cruciform pillars supporting pointed arches which originally upheld a ceiling of six barrel vaults. Three more similar cisterns, 9 metres (30 ft) deep, are found under the White Mosque and likely date from around the same time.

The construction of the Qubbat al-Khazna ('Dome of the Treasury') inside the Umayyad Mosque of Damascus is commonly attributed to an Abbasid governor Fadl ibn Salih in the late 8th century. The dome was used to store the mosque's endowments and house valuable manuscripts. Its mosaics reflect the earlier Umayyad style, closely resembling those found in the Umayyad Mosque.

=== Decoration ===
Under the Abbasids in Iraq stucco decoration developed more abstract motifs, as seen in the 9th-century palaces of Samarra. Three styles are distinguished by modern scholars: "style A" consists of vegetal motifs, including vine leaves, derived from more traditional Byzantine and Levantine styles; "style B" is a more abstract and stylized version of these motifs; and "style C", also known as the "beveled" style, is entirely abstract, consisting of repeating symmetrical forms of curved lines ending in spirals.

The Abbasid style became popular throughout the lands of the Abbasid Caliphate and is found as far as Afghanistan (e.g. the Nine Dome Mosque in Balkh) and Egypt (e.g. Ibn Tulun Mosque). The three types (Styles A, B, and C) of stucco decoration best exemplified, and perhaps developed, in Abbasid Samarra were quickly imitated elsewhere and Style C, which itself remained common in the Islamic world for centuries, was an important precursor to fully developed arabesque decoration. The Tulunids in Egypt imitated the style of Abbasid buildings in al-Qata'i, their capital near Fustat, located on the site of modern Cairo. The Ibn Tulun Mosque, built in 876–879, combines Umayyad and Abbasid structural and decorative features.

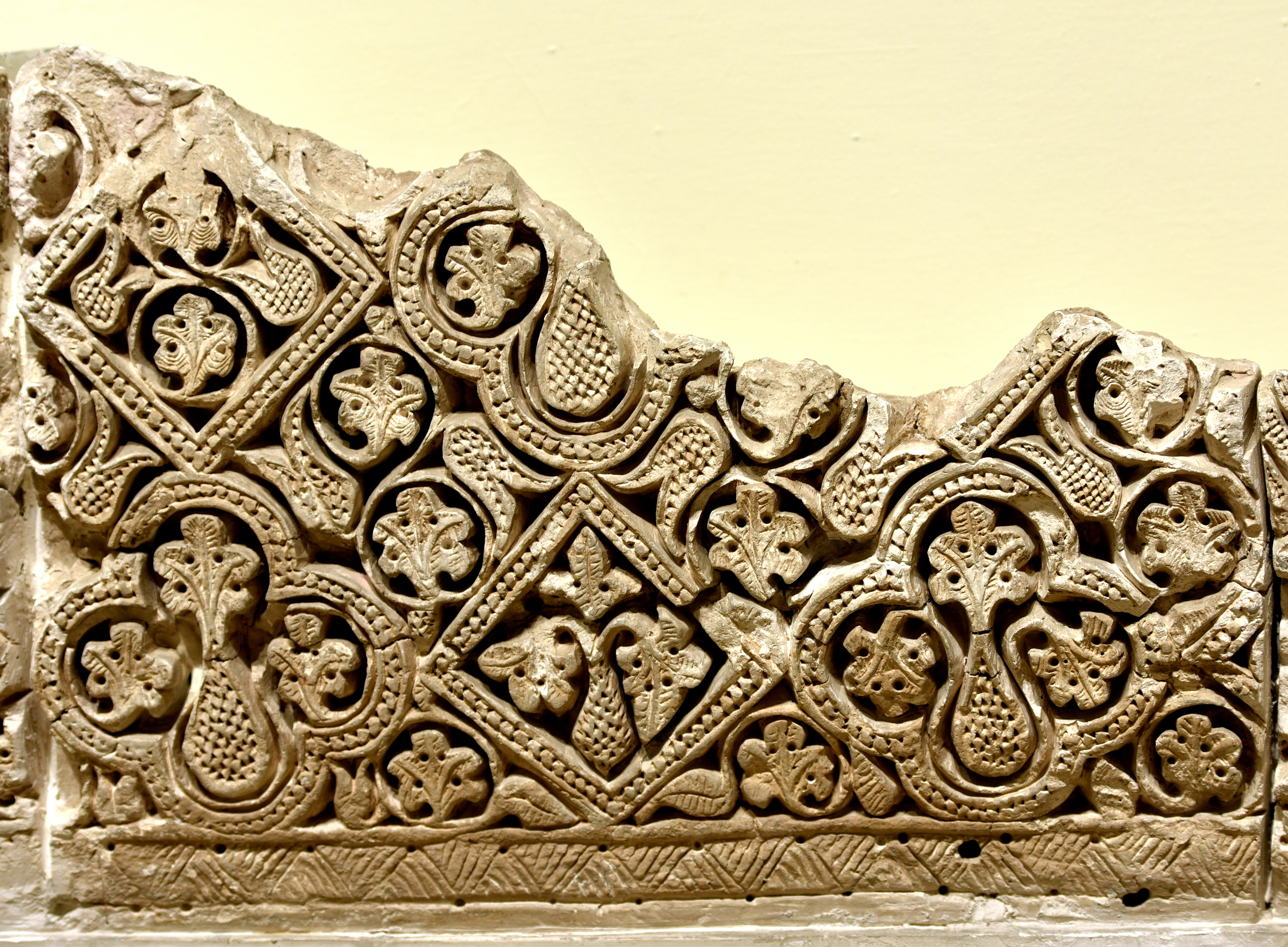
Panel of carved stucco wall decoration from Samarra (9th century) in Style A, with more naturalistic motifs (from the Iraq Museum)

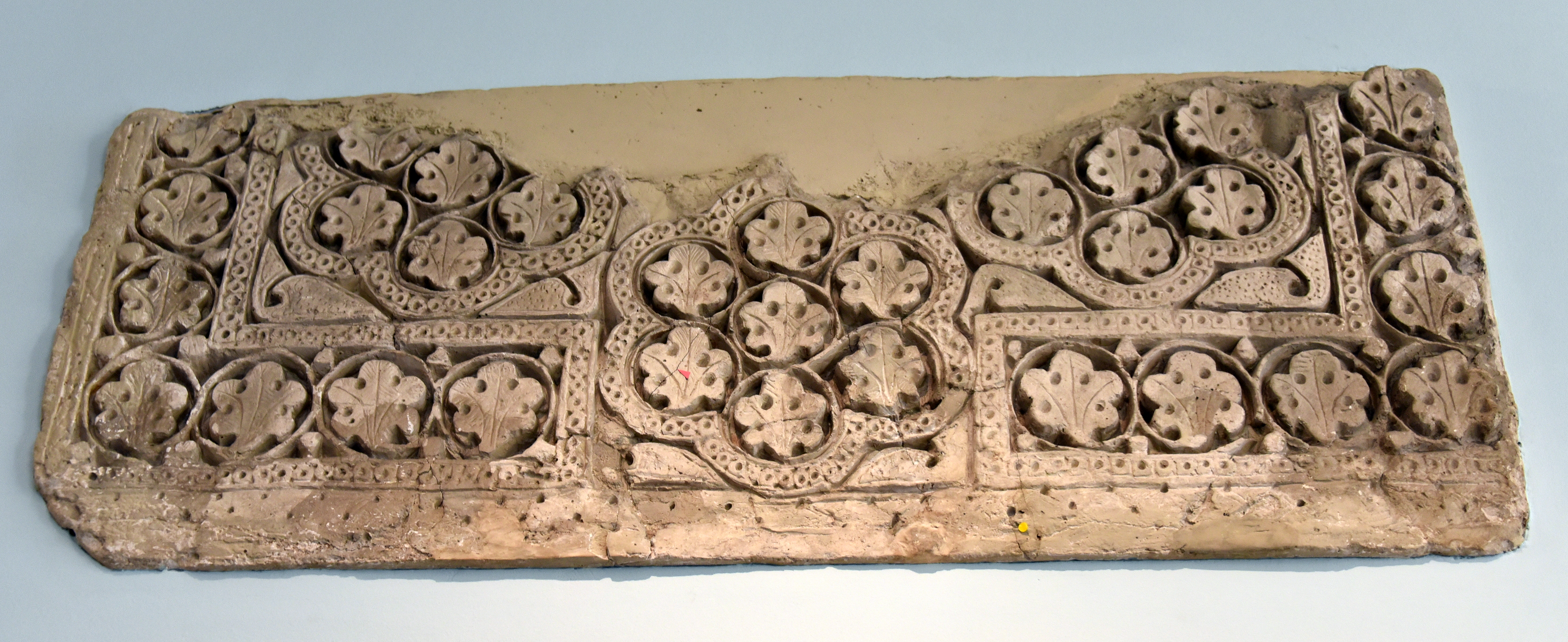
Panel of carved stucco wall decoration from Samarra (9th century) in Style A, with vine leaf motif (from the Museum of Islamic Art, Berlin)

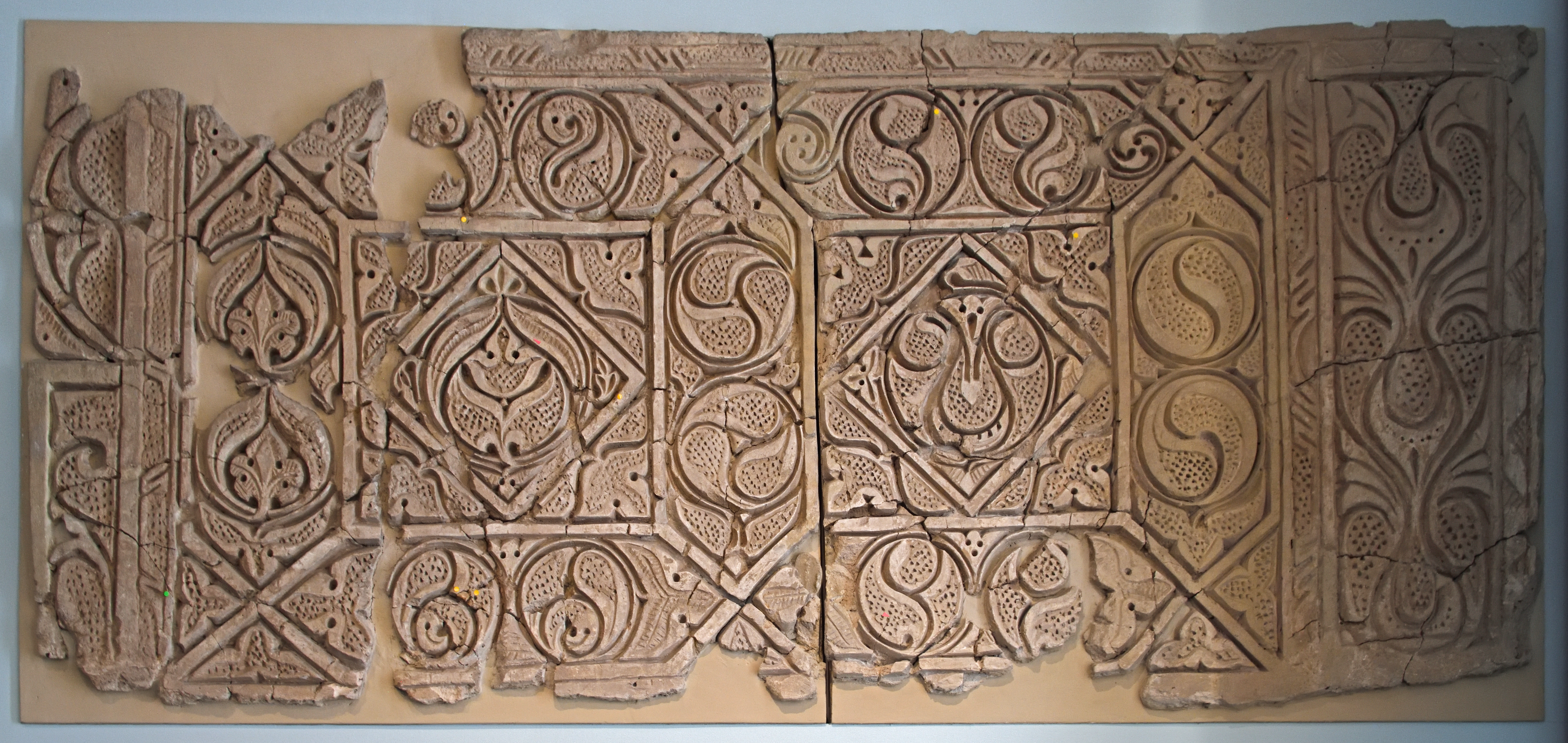
Panel of carved stucco wall decoration from Samarra (9th century) in Style B (from the Museum of Islamic Art, Berlin)

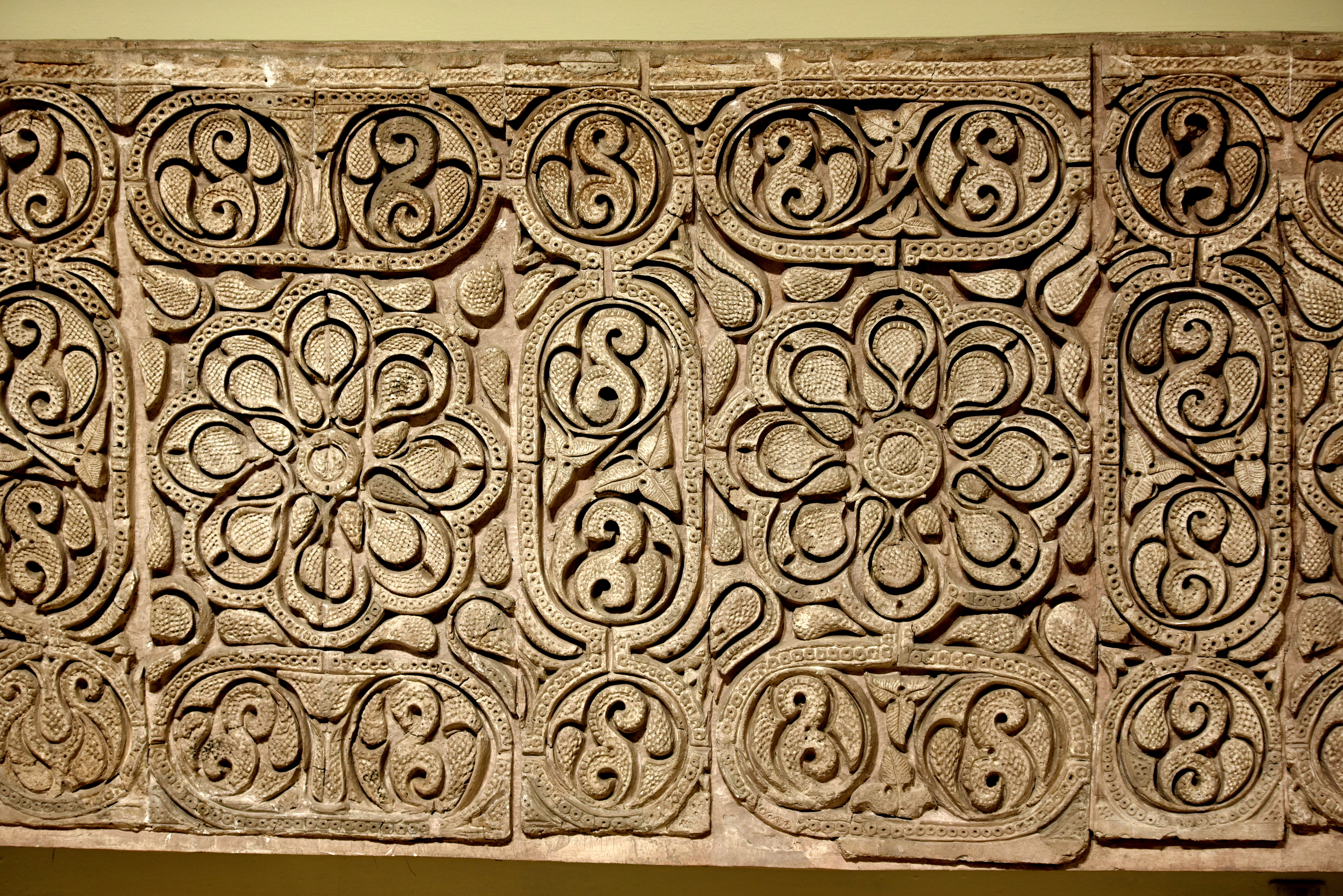
Carved stucco panel from Samarra (9th century), in Style B (from the Iraq Museum)

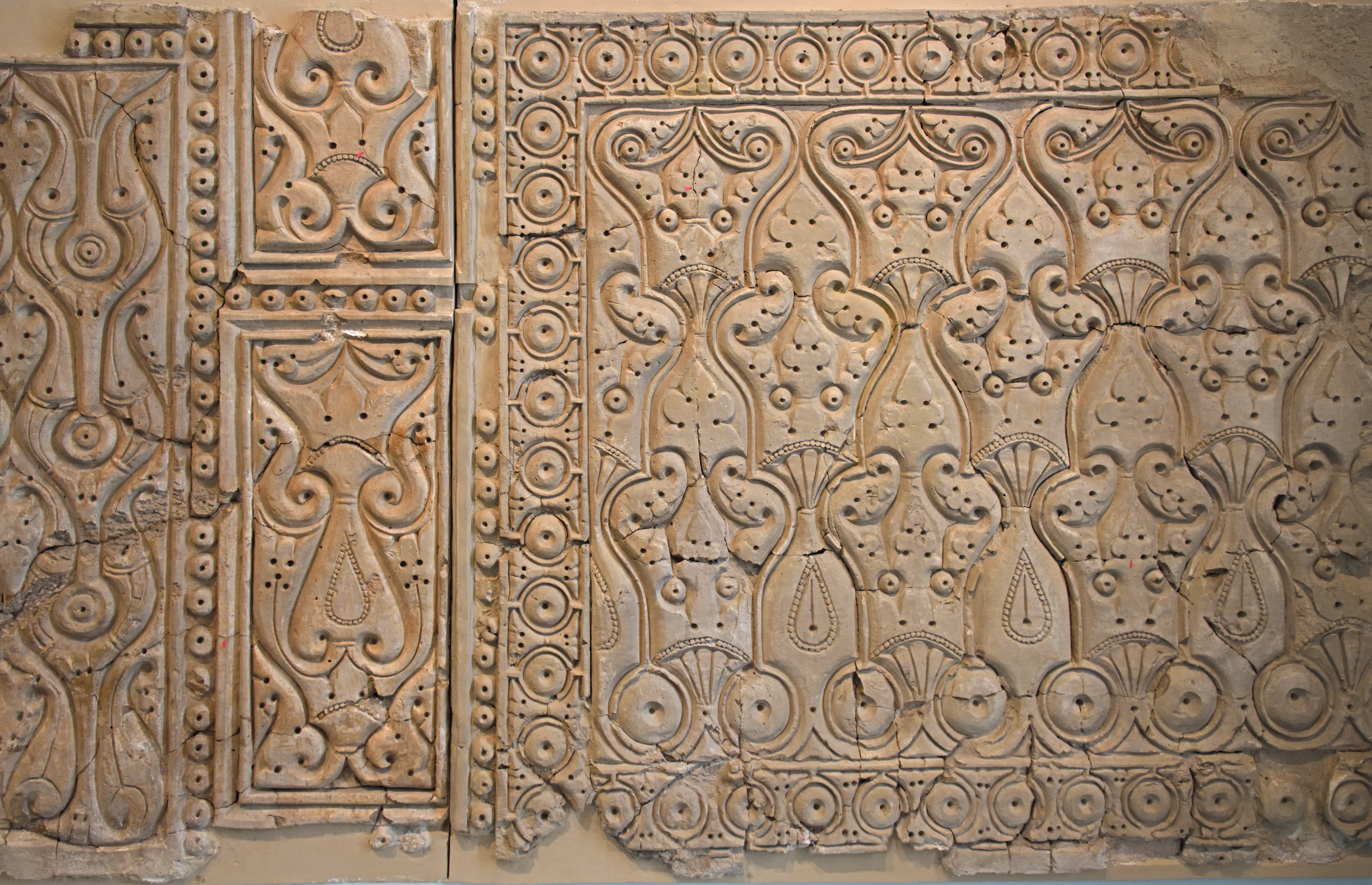
Carved stucco panels from Samarra (9th century) in Style C or "beveled" style, showing flatter and more abstract motifs (at the Museum of Islamic Art, Berlin)

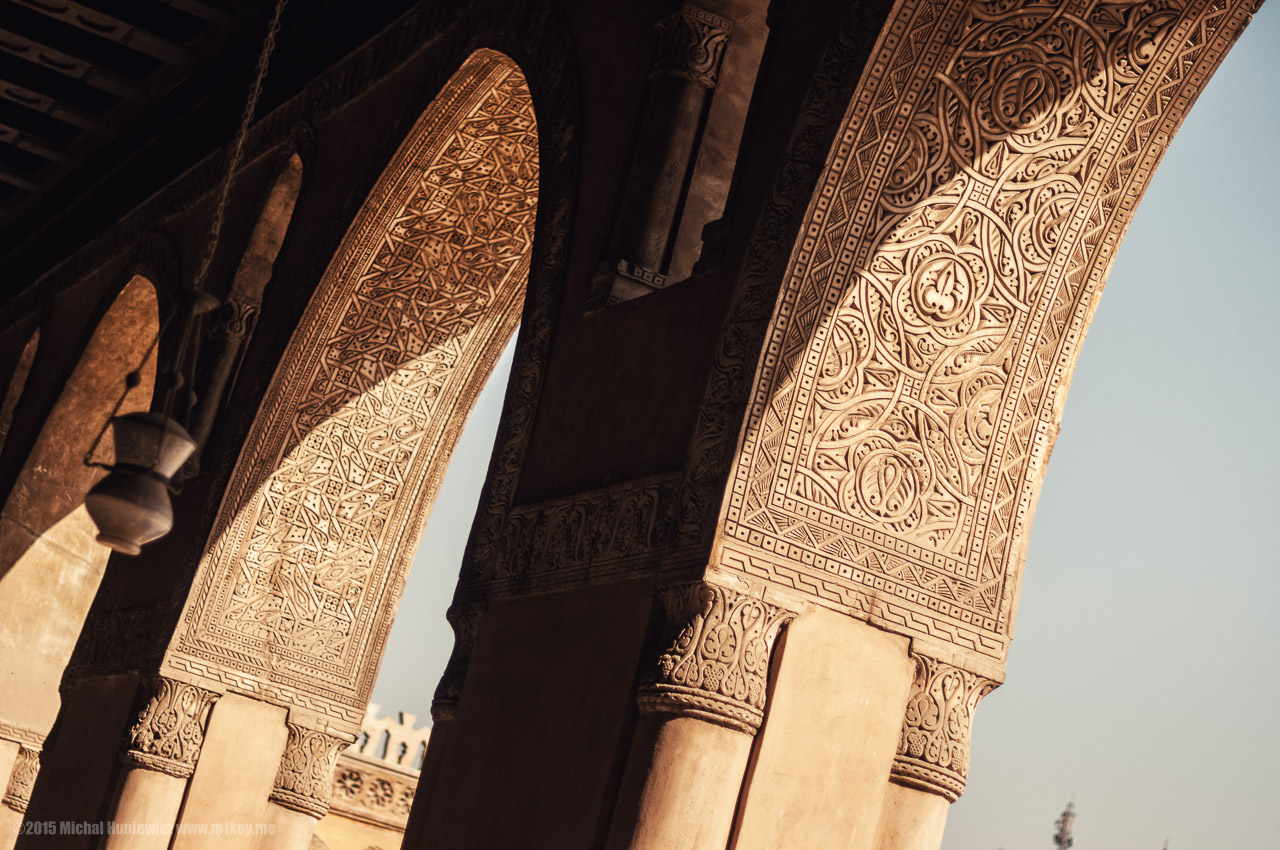
Abbasid geometric arch decorations in the Ibn Tulun Mosque in Cairo (9th century)

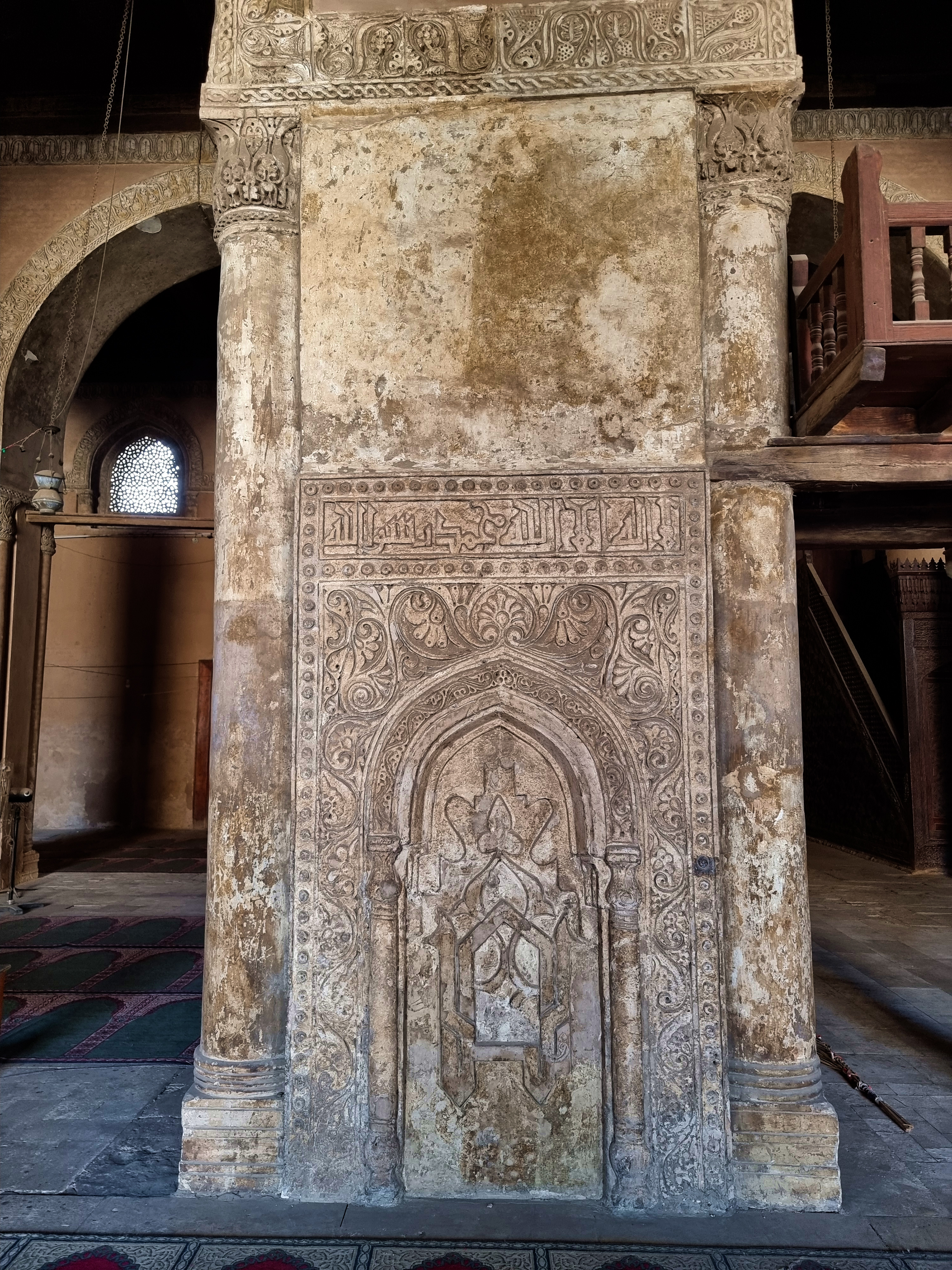
Abbasid-era stucco mihrab in the Ibn Tulun Mosque

== Late Abbasid architecture (12th–13th centuries) ==
Abbasid political power declined in the 10th century and later Abbasid caliphs were confined to Baghdad. They were less involved in public architectural patronage, which became instead dominated by the Seljuks and other rulers who formally declared loyalty to them but held de facto political power. As a result, it is difficult to differentiate architectural forms associated with the Abbasids from those associated with other dynasties from the 11th to 13th centuries. Abbasid architecture of the 12th and 13th centuries was essentially Seljuk architecture built with local Iraqi craftsmanship. Nonetheless, during the reigns of the last few caliphs in this period there was a renewal of caliphal patronage in Baghdad.

=== Religious and funerary monuments ===
Some late Abbasid monuments have been preserved in Baghdad, including the Mausoleum of Zumurrud Khatun, probably built at the end of the 12th century, (Note: This mausoleum lacks architectural inscriptions. An overview of Islamic architecture by Richard Ettinghausen, Oleg Grabar, and Marilyn Jenkins-Madina states that the individual for which it was constructed is unknown and estimates its construction to around the year 1152. Other authors state it was for Zumurrud Khatun, who died in 1203. Angelika Hartmann and Yasser Tabbaa attribute the construction to the Caliph al-Nasir (r. 1180–1225). Stefano Anastasio dates its construction to the end of the 12th century and Tabbaa similarly dates it to circa 1200. The mausoleum is sometimes said to belong to Sitta Zubayda, the wife of Harun al-Rashid (d. 809), but this is due to a misidentification by early European travelers. The mausoleum was also restored in modern times.) and the Mustansiriyya Madrasa, built in 1228–1233. Both have been significantly modified or restored in recent times. The Mausoleum of Sitta Zubayda, probably built by Caliph al-Nasir for his mother, Zumurrud Khatun, exemplifies an original type of mausoleum that was being built in Mesopotamia around this period: a polygonal chamber covered by a cone-like muqarnas dome. It was accompanied by an adjacent madrasa (opened in 1193) and ribat.

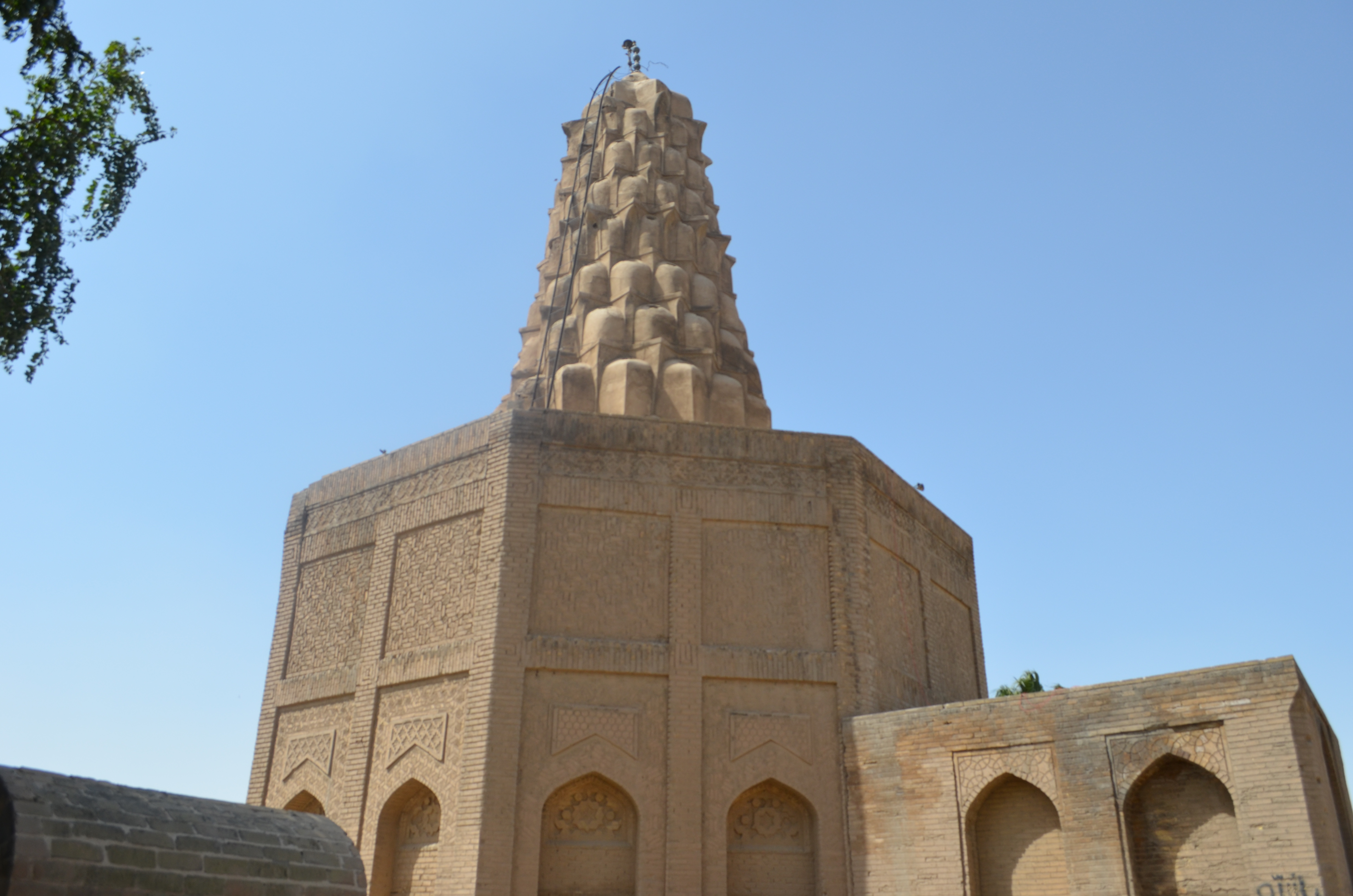
Zumurrud Khatun Mausoleum in Baghdad, built for Zumurrud Khatun, the mother of Caliph al-Nasir (late 12th century) (Note: This mausoleum lacks architectural inscriptions. An overview of Islamic architecture by Richard Ettinghausen, Oleg Grabar, and Marilyn Jenkins-Madina states that the individual for which it was constructed is unknown and estimates its construction to around the year 1152. Other authors, including Yasser Tabbaa, state it was for Zumurrud Khatun, who died in 1203. Stefano Anastasio dates its construction to the "end of the 12th century" and Tabbaa similarly dates it to circa 1200. The mausoleum is sometimes said to belong to Sitta Zubayda, the wife of Harun al-Rashid (d. 809), but this is due to a misidentification by early European travelers. The mausoleum was also restored in modern times.)

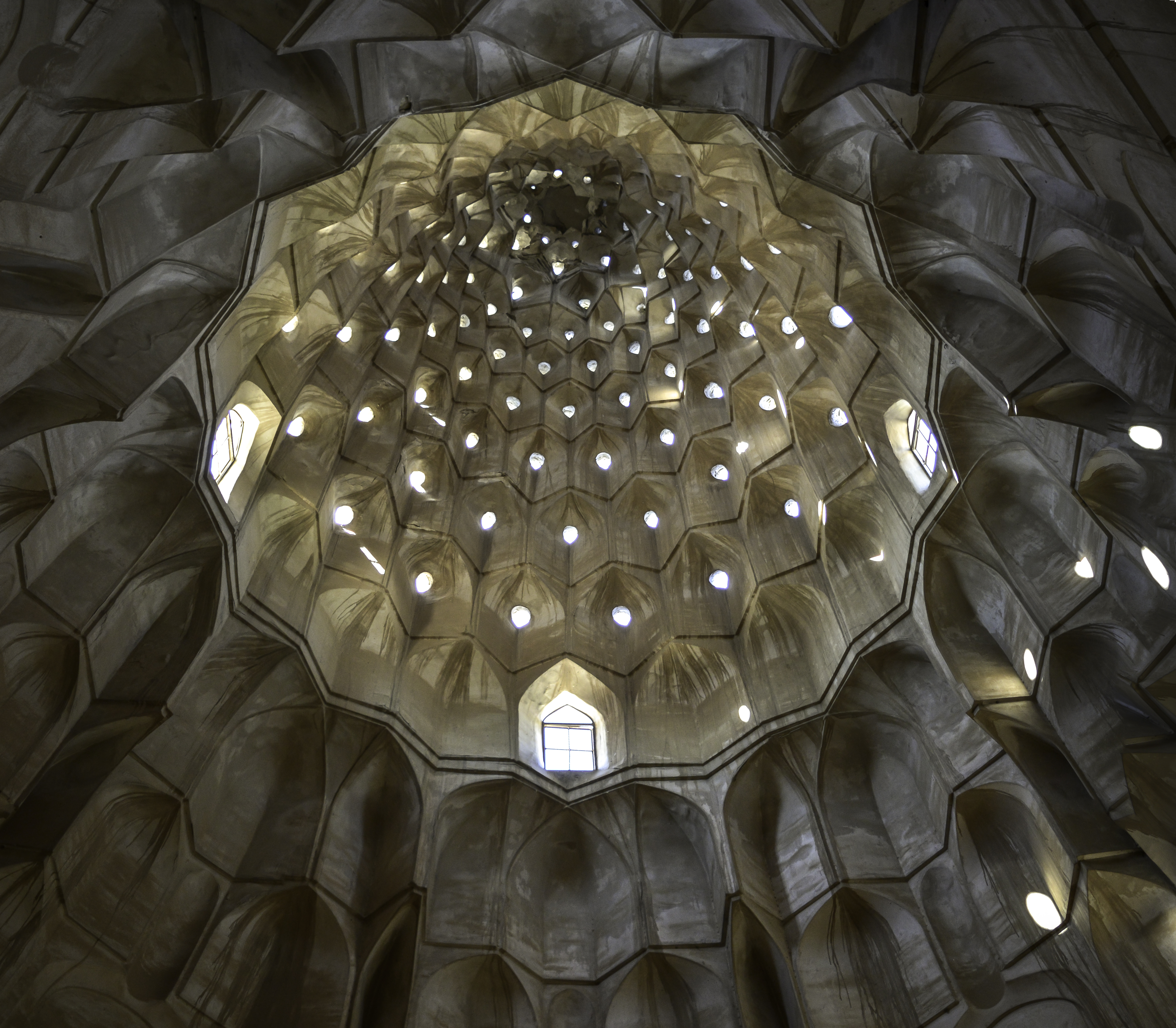
Interior of the muqarnas dome of Zumurrud Khatun Mausoleum

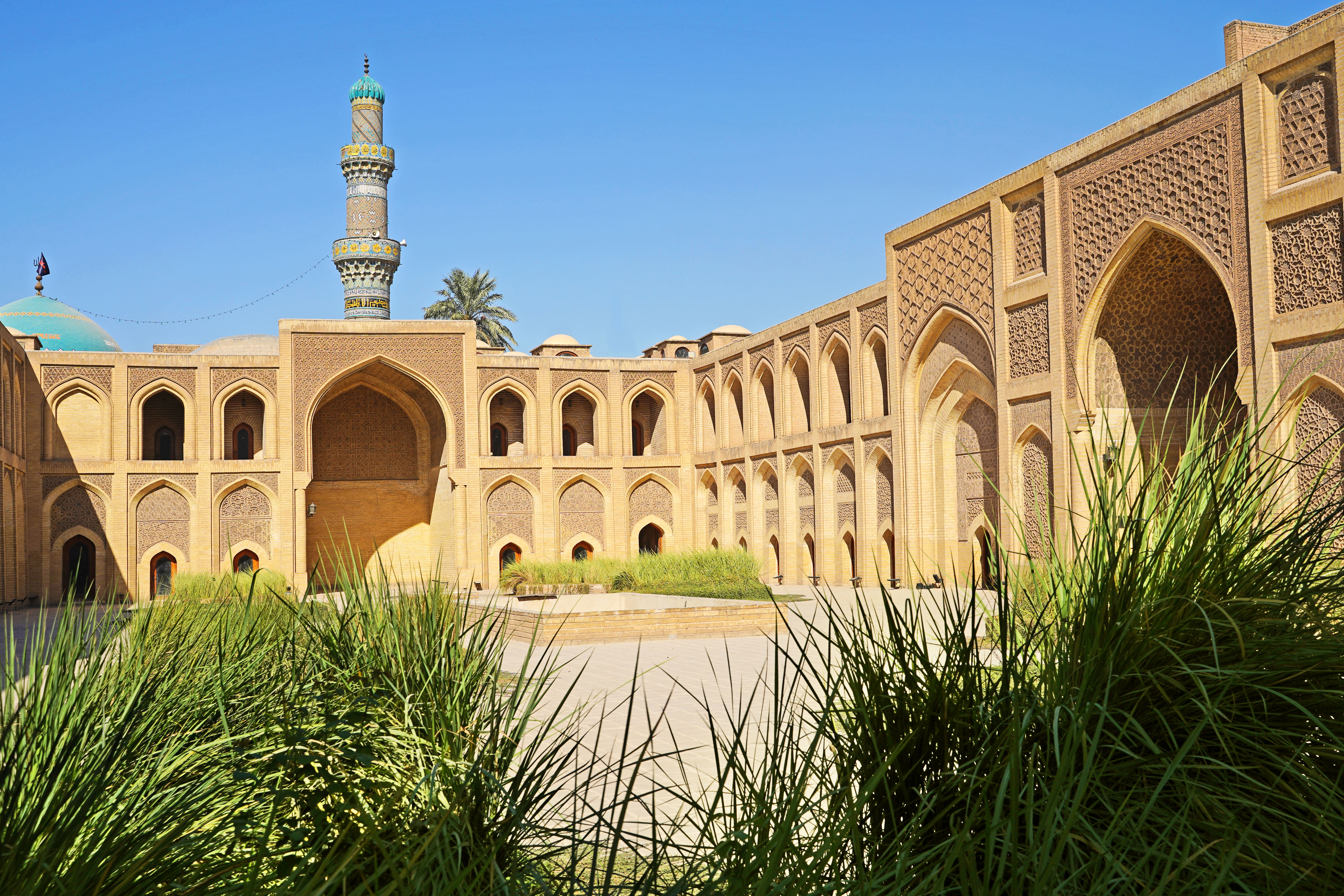
Mustansiriyya Madrasa in Baghdad (1228–1233)

The Mustansiriyya Madrasa was the first documented madrasa that was built to teach all four Sunni madhhabs. It followed the four-iwan plan common in contemporary Iranian architecture, but it had an unusually elongated form, possibly imposed by the narrow urban site. The courtyard displays a sophisticated combination of vaulting and carved relief decoration. It has two major iwans aligned with its long axis and two triple-iwan façades aligned with its short axis.

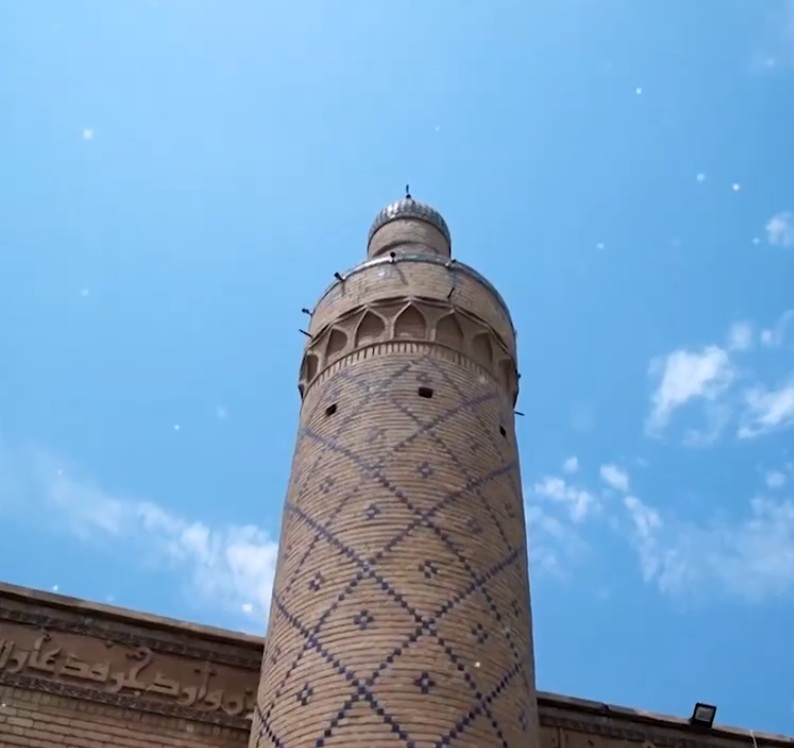
The minaret of the Qumriyya Mosque, built circa 1228 but now attached to a later building, is one of only two minarets surviving from the Abbasid period in Baghdad.

While no mosques from Abbasid Baghdad are preserved in full, there are two minarets from the late period which survive. They are the minarets of the al-Khaffafin Mosque and the Qumriyya Mosque, both now attached to mosque buildings from later periods. The al-Khaffafin Mosque was originally founded by Zumurrud Khatun before her death in 1202 but was completely replaced, aside from the minaret, by a new mosque sometime during the Ottoman period. Historical documents report that the Qumriyya Mosque was originally completed in 1228. Both minarets thus date from the first three decades of the 13th century. Built with baked brick, both have a polygonal base above which a cylindrical shaft rises that leads to a balcony, then topped by a smaller shaft that is crowned by a small dome. The balconies are supported on projecting tiers of muqarnas. The Qumriyya minaret is more simple in construction than the al-Khaffafin minaret but it features some decorative hazar‐baf brickwork.

=== Fortifications ===
Of Baghdad's fortifications, only Bab al-Wastani (or Bab al-Ja'fariya) survives today, while another gate, Bab al-Talsim ('Talisman Gate'), was documented in modern times but destroyed in 1917. Both were rebuilt by al-Nasir in 1221. Both consisted of a massive circular tower with a single arched passage through it, with the façade of both towers marked by a monumental inscription in high-quality calligraphy. Bab al-Talsim was noteworthy for a figural scene sculpted over its central archway that depicted a royal figure, possibly al-Nasir himself, wrestling with two dragons. The decoration above the inner gateway of Bab al-Wastani is still partly preserved and consists of a geometric 12-pointed star pattern superimposed over an arabesque background.

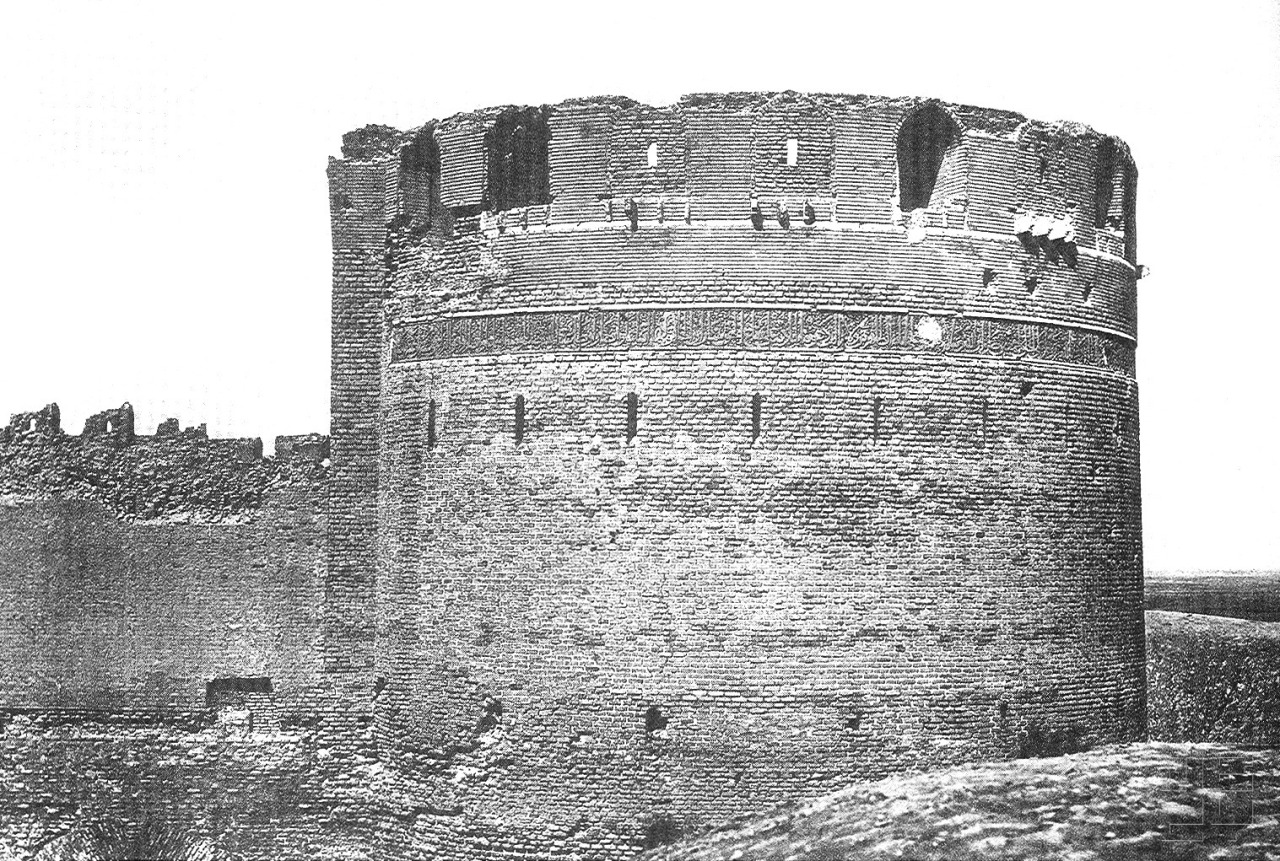
Tower of Bab al-Talsim ('Talisman Gate'), a fortified gate of Baghdad, built in 1221, destroyed in 1917

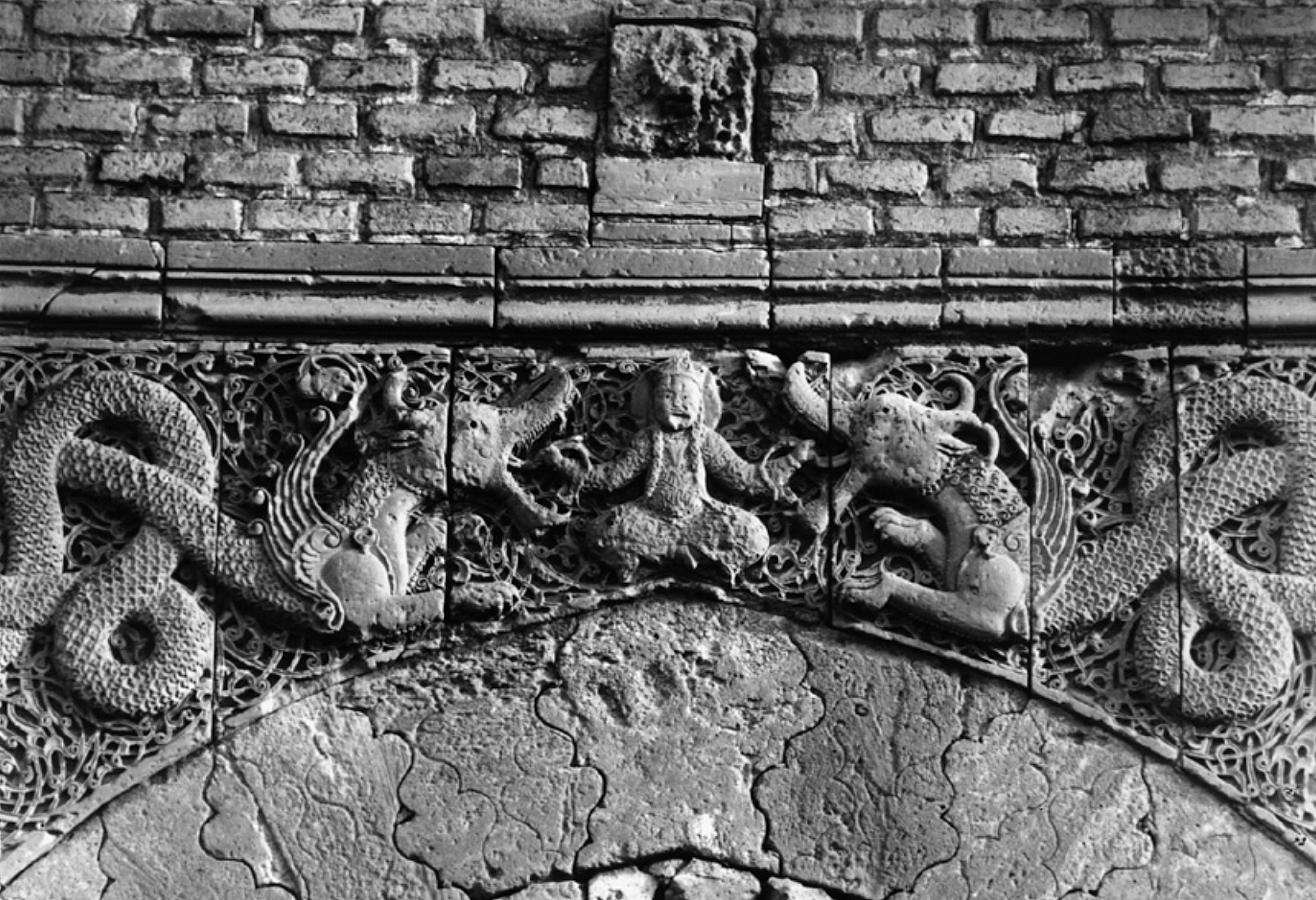
Figural scene carved on Bab al-Talsim, showing a figure wrestling two dragons

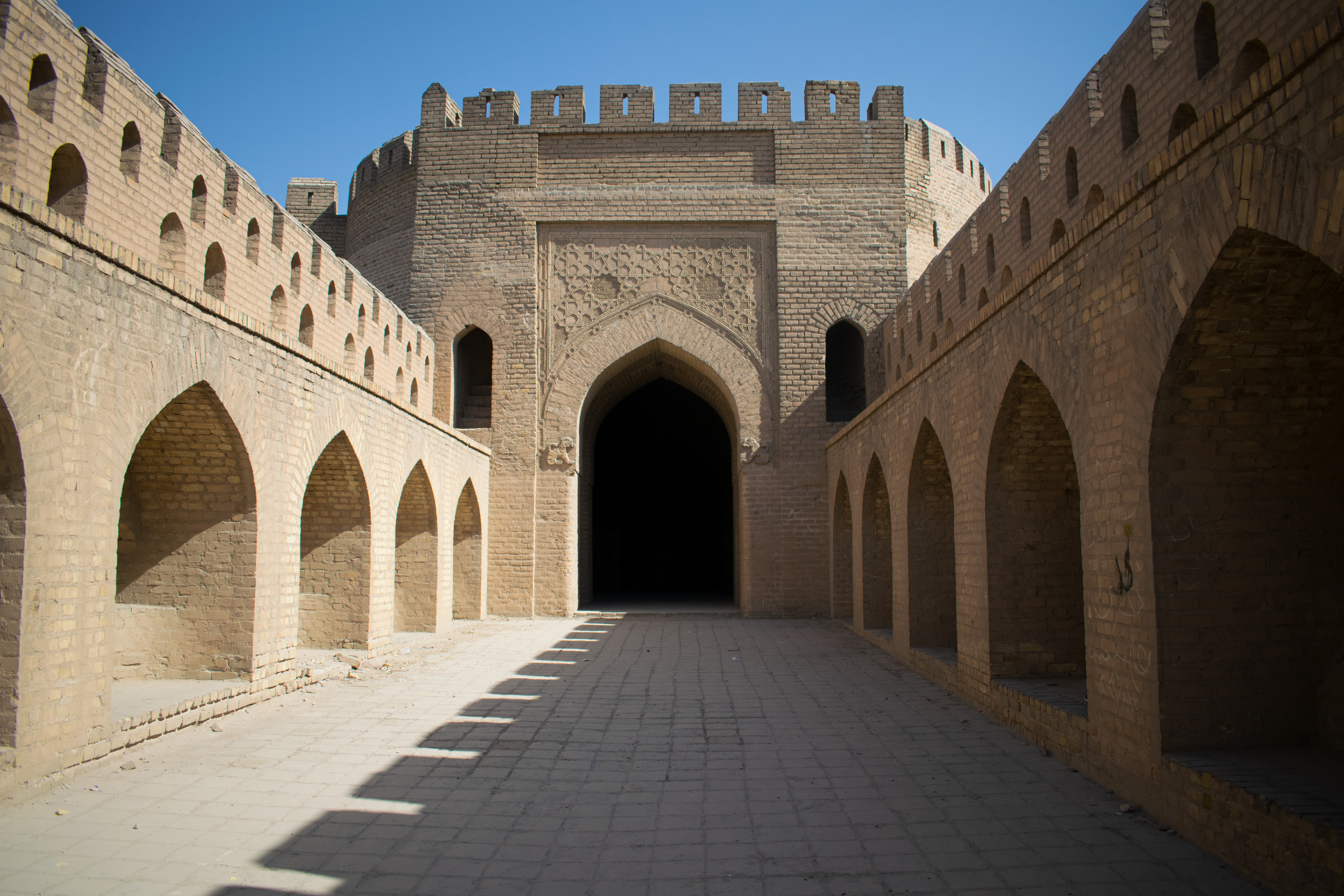
Bab al-Wastani (1221), the only Abbasid-era gate of Baghdad preserved today

=== The so-called Abbasid Palace ===
The only potential Abbasid palace structure left in Baghdad is located in the al-Maidan neighborhood overlooking the Tigris, in what was formerly the citadel of the city. Popularly known as the "Abbasid Palace", the origins and nature of the structure have been debated by scholars, as there are no surviving inscriptions or texts that identify its name or function. The building was erected under Caliph al-Nasir (r. 1180–1225) or possibly al-Mustansir (r. 1226–1242), in the late Abbasid period. It stands two stories high and contains a central courtyard and an iwan with a brick ceiling and façade. One of its most unique features is the series of muqarnas vaults that decorate the inside of its eastern gallery.

Its design shares close similarities with the Mustansiriyya Madrasa (completed in 1233), which has led some scholars to argue that it was actually a madrasa. These scholars have commonly identified it as most likely being the Madrasa al-Sharabiya, a school for Islamic theology built in 1230 by Sharif al-Din Iqbal, while some have identified it as the Bishiriya Madrasa, built in 1255. Another scholar, Yasser Tabbaa, has argued that the building lacks some key features of a madrasa and therefore its identification as a palace remains more plausible. He notes that some historical sources mention the construction of the Dar al-Masnat ("House by the Breakwater") begun by al-Nasir around this location towards 1184, which could therefore correspond to this structure. Significant parts of the building were reconstructed in the 20th century by the State Establishment of Antiquities and Heritage, including restoration of the great iwan and the adjacent facades.

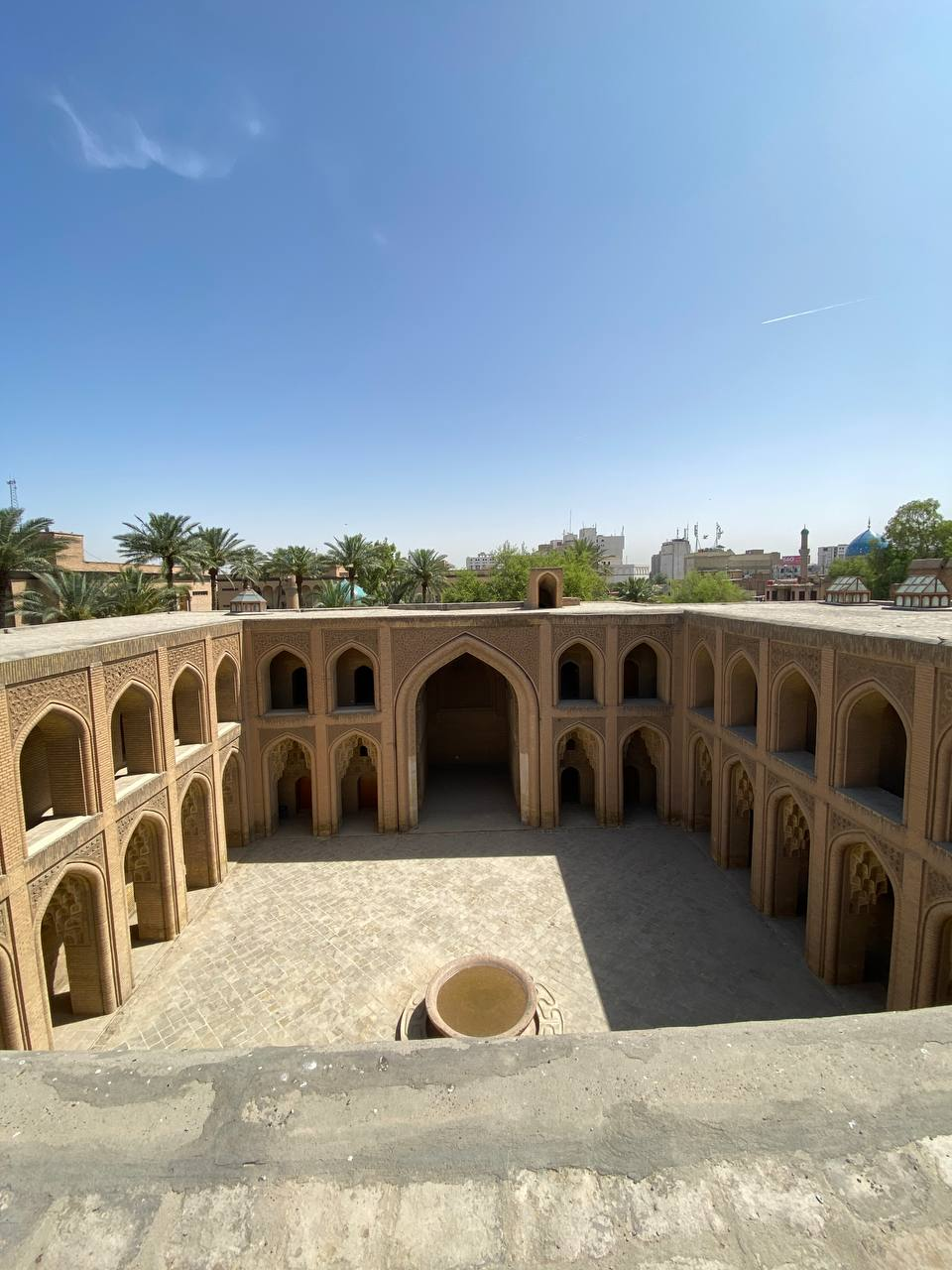
The so-called "Abbasid Palace" in Baghdad, tentatively dated to the reign of al-Nasir or al-Mustansir (late 12th or early 13th century)

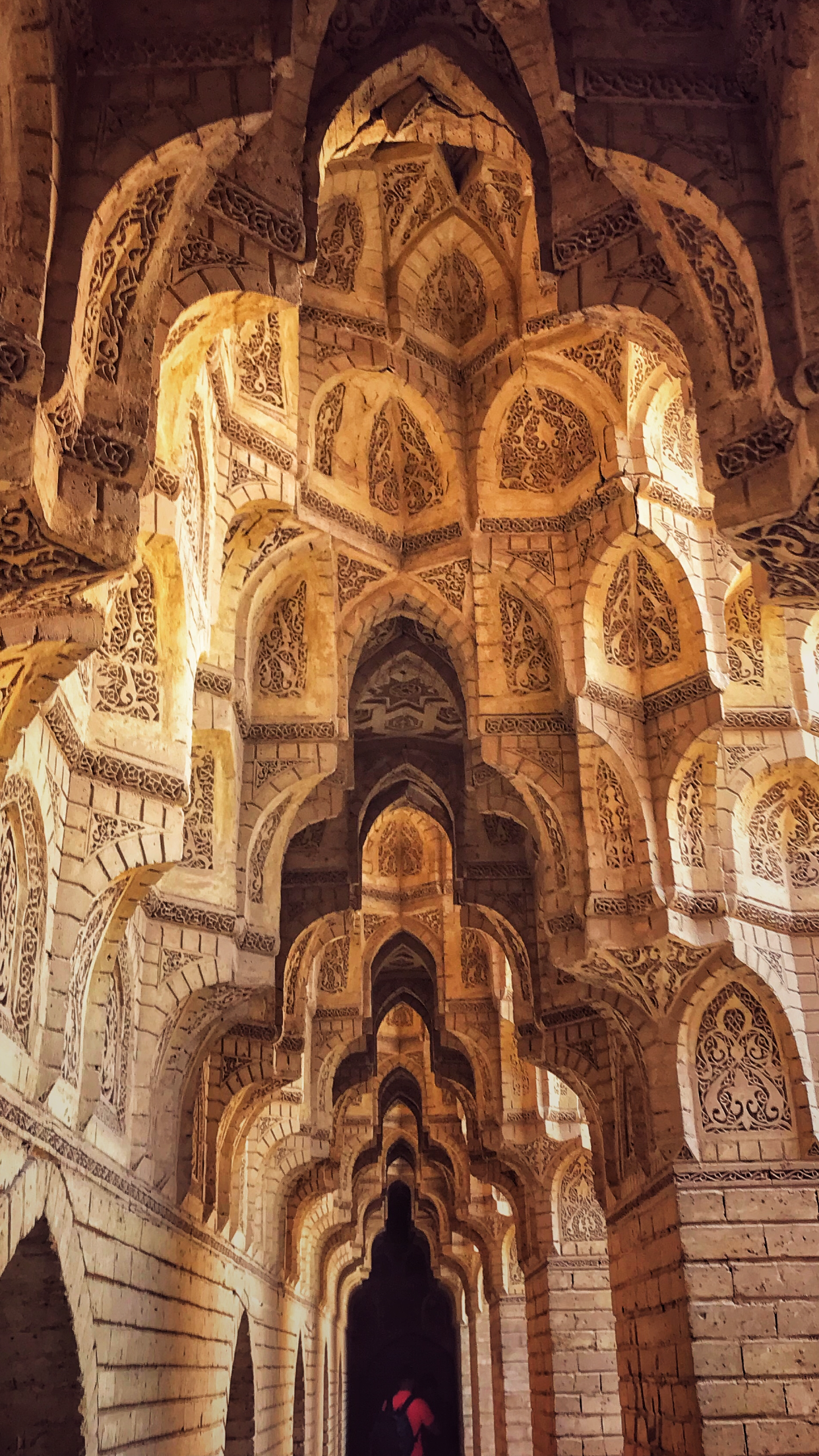
Detail of muqarnas vaulting in the "Abbasid Palace"

== See also ==
- Aghlabid architecture
- Al-Khulafa Mosque
- Muhammad bin Abdul Wahhab Al Faihani Palace
