= Buratha mosque bombing =

Triple suicide bombing in Baghdad on 7 April 2006

- Part of the Iraqi civil War
- Location: Baghdad, Iraq
- Date: 7 April 2006 (UTC+03:00)
- Target: Buratha Mosque
- Attack type: Triple suicide bombing
- Deaths: 85
- Injuries: 160
- Perpetrator: Unknown
- Motive: Anti-Shi'ism

The Buratha mosque bombing was a triple suicide bombing that occurred on April 7, 2006, in Baghdad. The attack killed 85 people and wounded 160 others.

== The attacks ==
As worshippers were leaving the Buratha Mosque, a historic mosque and Shi'ite holy place in the Karkh district of Baghdad, after Friday prayers, one of three suicide bombers, two out of the three were dressed as women, detonated himself after passing through the women's security checkpoint, and entering the mosque. The second suicide bomber detonated inside the courtyard of the mosque and the third bomber detonated inside the office of Sheikh Jalaluddin al-Saghir, a member of the Iraqi parliament, in an attempt to assassinate him. However, al-Saghir was unharmed in the attack.

In the end the three bombers managed to kill 85 people, and injure 160.
