= Haifa Street =

Street in Baghdad, Iraq

Coordinates: 33°20′11.4″N 44°22′53.4″E

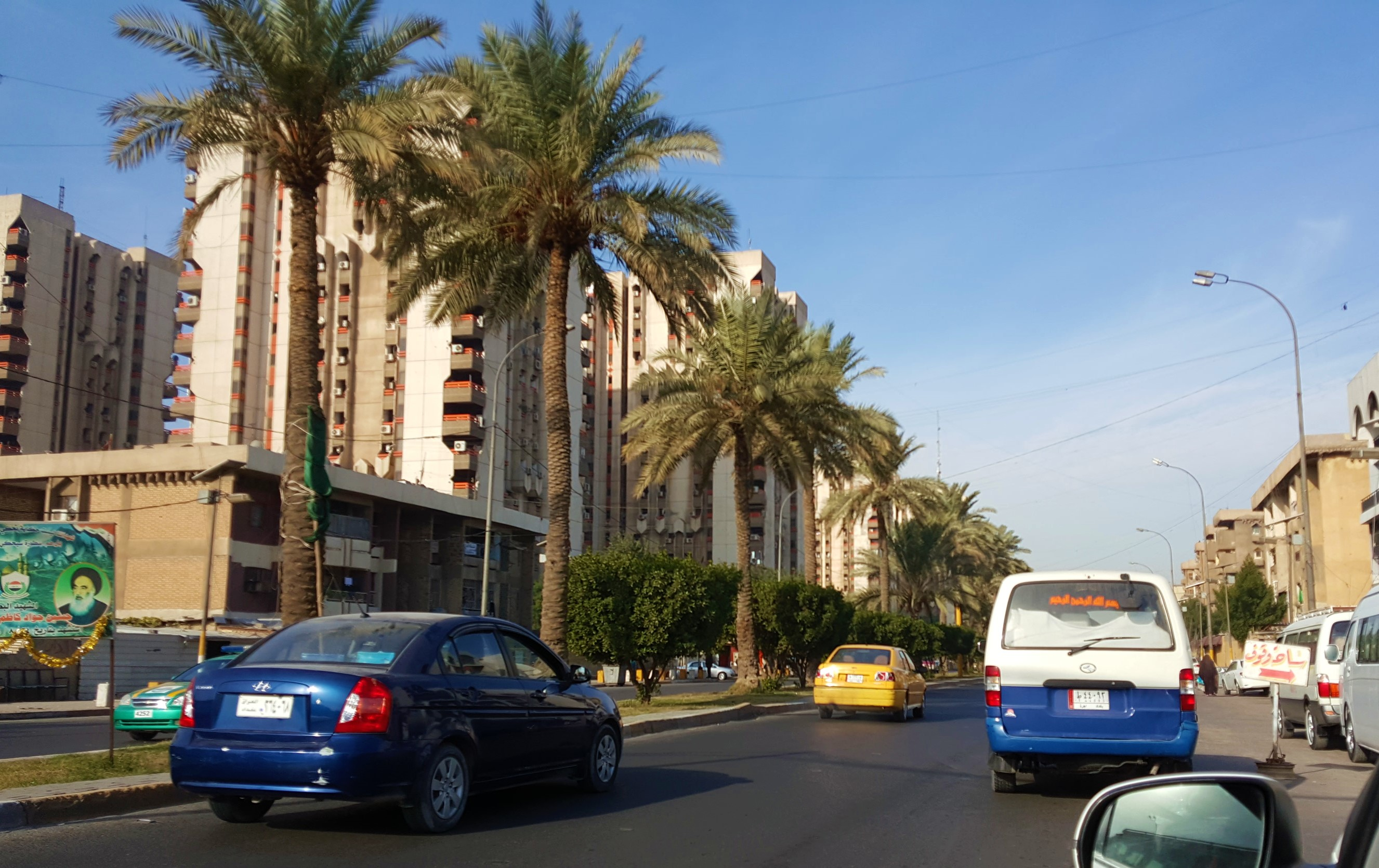
- Haifa Street, a main street of al-Karkh in 2017
- Interactive map of Haifa Street
- Native name: Arabic: شارع حيفا
- Part of: al-Karkh
- Location: Baghdad, Iraq

Other
- Designer: Mo'ath al-Alusi
- Known for: 1. Statue of King Faisal I 2. High-Rise apartments 3. Sheikh Sandal Mosque; 4. Various government offices
- Status: Active

Haifa Street (Arabic: شارع حيفا) is a three-kilometre-long street in al-Karkh, Baghdad, Iraq, named after the port city of Haifa. It runs parallel to the Tigris and, along with Yafa Street (named after the port city of Jaffa), it leads to the Assassin's Gate, an archway that served as the main entrance to the American-run Green Zone during the 2003 invasion of Iraq, as well as al-Shawy Mosque. The street was given its current name by Saddam Hussein in the 1980s as part of a redevelopment program, and is lined with many high-rise buildings.

== Description ==
Haifa Street contains the Haifa residential complex on al-Karkh which includes eight complex parts. The complex is made of high separated residential masses with some floors being up to 15 floors. The apartments can be high-rise buildings with more than ten floors. The lower-rise buildings contain some floors are only two to ten floors. These are surrounded by open spaces which include parking lots, spaces for activities and other public services. The buildings were also designed to be more personally and socially connected; they're noted for their unique private urban identity. The street's sidewalks contains many columns designed so that cars won't park on the sidewalks. It also contains shades for traffic police and terraces for pedestrian sitting. The street also contains the Sheikh Sandal Mosque which is located in front of nine of the buildings on the street. The mosque is one of the oldest buildings in the street which dates back to the Ottoman period. It originally contained a dome that rested on four columns but after it was rebuilt, the dome no longer existed. The mosque is also located around a courtyard and a minaret that is decorated with Karbalai tapestry.

Prior to the 1990–91 Gulf War, the British Embassy in Iraq was located on Haifa Street.

== Historical background ==
High apartments on Haifa Street.

The area that would become Haifa Street contained the old Sheikh Sandal Mosque which was a part of al-Karkh and used to house festivals, feasts, and all Islamic prayers. The mosque played a large role in fueling enthusiasm in the Iraqi Revolt against British colonialism. It fostered the chastity of a number of Baghdad's poets.

The later modern buildings on Haifa Street were designed by Mo'ath al-Alusi who mentioned in his book "Nostos. The Story Of A Street In Baghdad" his attempts at not violating the traditional urban fabric of al-Karkh, the western part of Baghdad, due to the high buildings the street contains. According to Mo'ath, much of old Karkh was removed in the 1950s and as such the urban fabric of al-Karkh. Mo'ath's efforts triggered a debate on the relationship between old and modern architecture and what it could have been. According to al-Alusi the project was also flawed in that it didn't contain open public spaces which he described as an imbalance to the population living in the street. Due to this, officials inserted designs for parks around the street. Furthermore, columns were added to not make cars park on the sidewalks. In his book, al-Alusi described the high-rise buildings on the streets as he says:

"The fifteen-floor buildings will seem like bizarre pilings in Baghdad's sky; nine of which are in front of Sheikh Sandal's mosque, near the districts of "al-Falahat" and "al-Fahama". It is considered an unusual urban fabric compared to its surroundings."

Due to this, Haifa Street became a symbol of modernization's cuts with the past and traditions as many old al-Karkh buildings were demolished in favor of the street and its project.

=== Present day ===
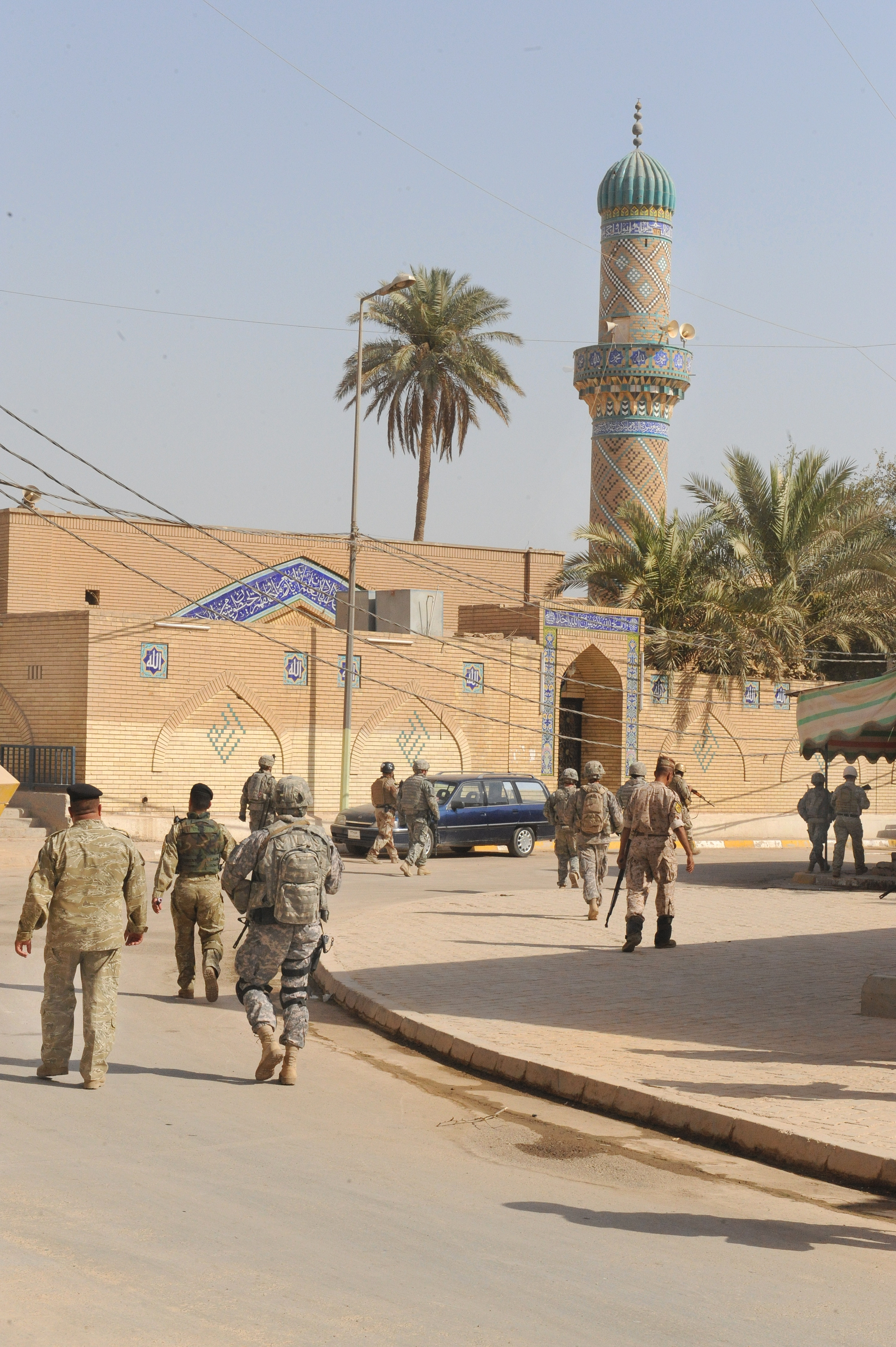
US troops in Haifa Street, June 2009.

Haifa Street was the location of the June 2004 Operation Haifa Street, and the September 2004 Haifa Street helicopter incident, in which a helicopter fired on a burning American Bradley Fighting Vehicle and killed 12 civilians, including journalist Mazen al-Tumeizi. Two days later a massive car bombing on Haifa Street killed 47. American troops stationed in Baghdad at the time, C Company, 1/153 IN of the Arkansas Army National Guard, part of Task Force 1/9, dubbed the street "Purple Heart Boulevard".

On December 24, 2004, U.S. Soldiers from B Co. 3/325th AIR of the 82d Airborne Division in taking over a palace, later dubbed Predator Palace, and made it the 3/325th A.I.R. home for 4 months. During this time the paratroopers performed combat missions to assist weeding out the enemy. Ultimately the efforts of B Co. 3/325 AIR, made Haifa Street a safer place. By mid-2005 there were reports that conditions on Haifa Street had calmed, and control of the street was turned over to Iraqi forces in February 2006 but as of early 2007 the street remained riddled with insurgent hideouts. Fifty people were killed in a U.S.-led operation there on January 9, 2007 and another thirty were killed on January 24.

In early 2023, the prime minister of Iraq Mohammed Shia' al-Sudani launched a campaign and project to rehabilitate Haifa Street to turn it into a "model street". The project included the paving of the sidewalks with glazed muqarnas, removing deformities, installing decorative lighting poles and for the buildings, constructing four fountains, furnishing the street's traffic signs, installing bicycle lanes, painting the façades of the buildings, and planning. The project finished its first branch in late of that same year.
