= Ibn al-Shajari =

- إبن الشجري
- Born: c. 1058; Karakh, Baghdad
- Died: c. 1148; Karakh, Baghdad

Academic work
- Era: Islamic Golden Age
- Main interests: philology, Grammar, lexicography
- Notable works: Kitab al-Amali (كتاب الأمالي); ‘Book of Dictations’

Ḍiyāʾ al-Dīn Abū al-Saʿādāt Hibatallāh ibn Alī (Arabic: ضياء الدين أبوالسعادات هبة الله بن علي) (c. 450–542 AH) (c. 1058–1148 AD) simply known as Ibn al-Shajari (إبن الشجري), was a prominent Arab grammarian, philologist and poet of Arabic. Widely celebrated for his knowledge of pre-Islamic Arabic literature.

== Biography ==
Ibn al-Shajari was born in 1058 AD in the Hijri month of Shawwal in the city of Baghdad, which at this exact year was under the rule of the Fatimid Caliphate armies who assumed control of the city for a brief period before the Seljuks captured it again. He was a descendant of Ali ibn Abi Talib, the cousin of Muhammad and the last caliph of the Rashidun Caliphate who ruled from 656 to 661. Hence he was also known by the nisba al-Sharif al-Hasani al-Alawi. Al-Suyuti records a detailed genealogy of Ibn al-Shajari in his book Tuḥfat al-Adīb. According to Ibn Khallikan, Ibn al-Shajari studied philology and poetry in Baghdad under the tutelage of Abu Mu'ammar ibn Tabataba. He spend most of his life in al-Karkh, a district in the western part of Baghdad. Succeeding his father, he was appointed to the Naqib office, acting as the head of the Alids in the area. In the later years of his life, he dedicated his time to teach literature at Baghdad, and he composed a handful of poetry alongside his literary works. Among his pupils were many who would become renown for their knowledge, such as Abu al-Barakat al-Anbari, Ibn Khashab al-Baghdadi and al-Taj al-Kindi. A handful of works in Grammar and lexicography has been attributed to him, notably Kitab al-Amaly (كتاب الأمالي; Book of Dictations). Ibn al-Shajari died in Baghdad on Thursday 18 February 1148. He was thus buried in his house in al-Karakh.

== Works ==
- Kitab al-Amaly (كتاب الأمالي; Book of Dictations)
- Commentary on the Jumal of Ibn Jinni
- Commentary on the Tasrif al-Muluki
- Hamasa

== See also ==
- List of pre-modern Arab scientists and scholars
