= List of mosques in Baghdad =

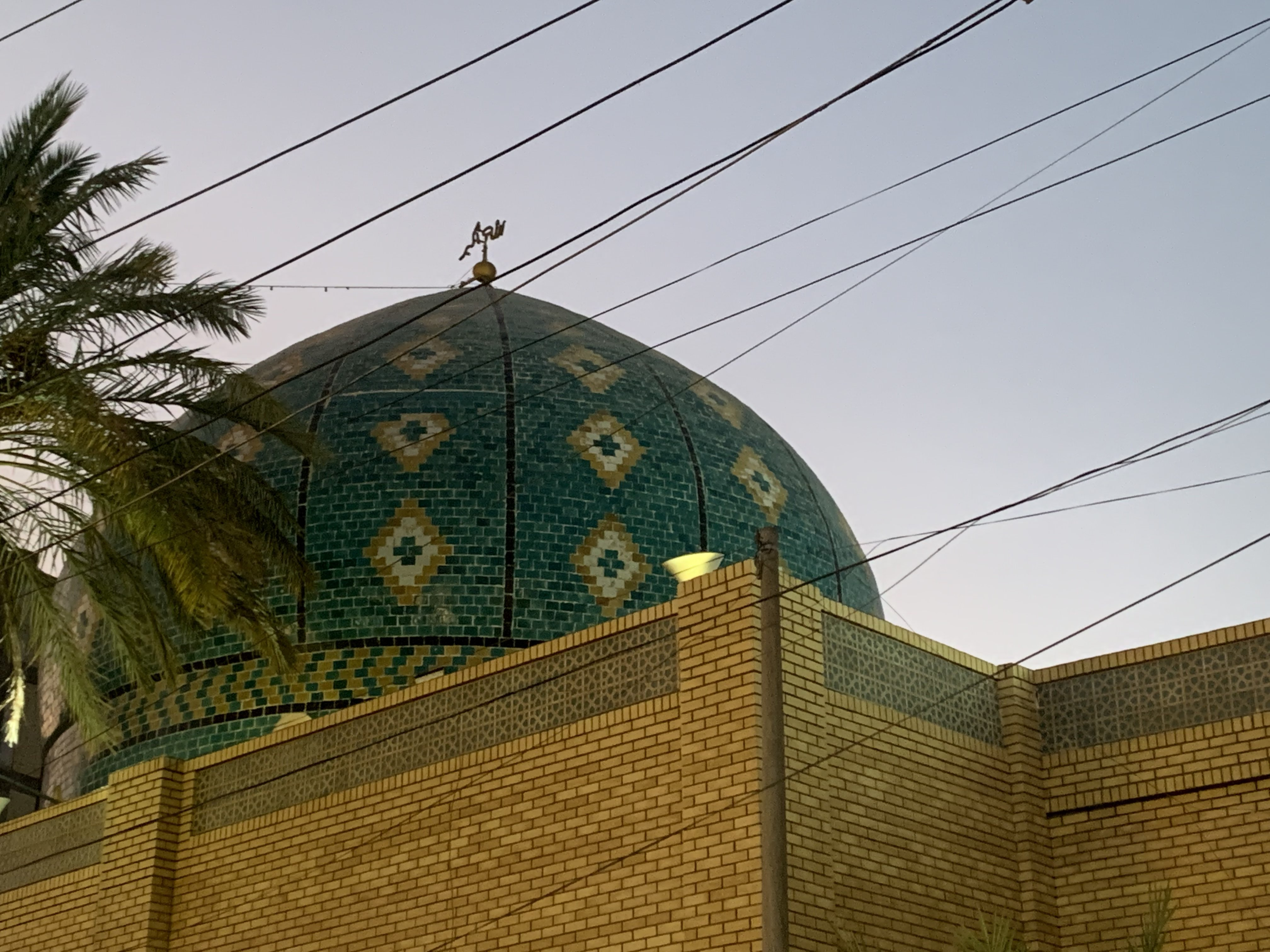
Saadia al-Omari Mosque in Baghdad

This is a list of mosques in Baghdad from different dynastic periods.

Baghdad, in Iraq, was once the capital of the Abbasid Caliphate and a center of Islamic advancements. Today, there are 912 congregational mosques in Baghdad that conduct Friday Prayer, and 149 smaller mosques that only hold regular daily prayers.

== List ==
Name	Images	Period	Year	Branch	District	Remarks
Al-Khulafa Mosque		Abbasid	c. 902–908	Su	Rusafa	Oldest existing mosque in Baghdad, although renovated for numerous times. The minaret dates back to the Abbasid era.
Al-Kazimiyya Mosque		Abbasid	c. 915	TS	Kadhimiya; 33°22′47.89″N 44°20′16.64″E	One of the holiest sites for Twelver Shia Islam
Abu Hanifa Mosque		Abbasid	c. 1065	Su	Adhamiya; 33°22′20″N 44°21′30″E	Preserves the tomb of Abu Hanifa, the founder of Hanafi madhhab
Mausoleum of Abdul-Qadir Gilani		Abbasid	12th century	Su	Rusafa	Originally built as a mausoleum. Preserves the tomb of Abdul Qadir Gilan, the founder of Qadiriyya Sufi order
Mausoleum of Umar Suhrawardi		Abbasid	12th century	Su	Rusafa	Originally built as mausoleum. Preserves the tomb of Shahab al-Din Abu Hafs Umar Suhrawardi, the founder of Suhrawardiyya Sufi order
Zumurrud Khatun Mosque		Abbasid	c. 1202		Rusafa	Originally built as a mausoleum. The minaret is considered the oldest surviving in Baghdad.
Qamariya Mosque		Abbasid	c. 1242		Karkh	
Al-Sarai Mosque		Ilkhanate	1293	Su	Rusafa	
Murjan Mosque		Ilkhanid	1356		Rusafa	
Al-Aqoli Mosque		Ilkhanid	1372	Su	Rusafa	Built next to the tomb of Ibn al-Aquli, a mufti and Islamic judge who served the Islamic court during the reign of Abu Sa'id Bahadur Khan.
Al-Muradiyya Mosque		Ottoman	1570		Rusafa	
Syed Sultan Ali Mosque		Ottoman	1590	Su	Rusafa	
Al-Asifyah Mosque		Ottoman	1608	Su	Rusafa	
Al-Wazeer Mosque		Ottoman	1660	Su	Rusafa	
Uzbek Mosque		Ottoman	1682	Su	Rusafa	
Al-Khilani Mosque		unknown	c. 1726	TS	Rusafa	Originally built as a mausoleum. Preserves the tomb of Abu Jafar Muhammad ibn Uthman, the second of The Four Deputies in Twelver Shia Islam.
Al-Ahmadiya Mosque		Ottoman	1796	Su	Rusafa	
Haydar-Khana Mosque		Ottoman	1819	Su; Sh	Rusafa	
Al-Adliya Mosque		Ottoman	1749		Rusafa	
Shabandar Mosque		Ottoman	c. 1902	Su	Adhamiya	An old mosque built during the era of the Ottoman Empire in 1902 and located in the Adhamiya
17th of Ramadan Mosque		Modern	1938		Rusafa	
Fatah Pasha Mosque		Modern	1943		Kadhimiya	
Buratha Mosque		Modern	1954	TS	Karkh	Twelver Shi'ite mosque, built on the site of a former Christian monastery
Al-Shawy Mosque		Modern	1954	Su	Karkh	
Al-Asafi Mosque		Modern	1956		Rusafa	
Umm al-Tabul Mosque		Modern	1968		Al-Mansour	
Ibn Bunnieh Mosque		Modern	1973		Karkh	
Hajja Saadia al-Omari Mosque		Modern	1976		Al-Mansour	
Al-Rahman mosque		Modern	1999	Su; Sh	Al-Mansour; 33°18′42″N 44°20′58″E	Incomplete, construction halted
Umm al-Qura Mosque		Modern	2001	Su	Al-Mansour; 33°20′16″N 44°17′46″E	
Al-Musta'sim Billah Mosque		Modern	2005	Su	Adhamiyah	A complete reconstruction of an older mosque, it contains the tomb of the last Abbasid Caliph, al-Musta'sim.

Group
Su	Sunni
Sh	Shī‘ah
TS	Twelver Shī‘ah

== See also ==
- Architecture of Iraq
- Islam in Iraq
- List of mosques in Iraq
- Tourism in Baghdad
