= Shabandar Mosque =

Sunni mosque Baghdad, Iraq

- مسجد الشابندر
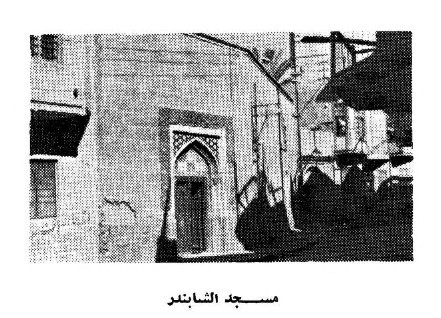
- The mosque in 1965

- Location of the mosque in Baghdad

Religion
- Affiliation: Sunni Islam
- Ecclesiastical or organizational status: Mosque
- Status: Active

Location
- Location: Adhamiyah, Baghdad, Baghdad Governorate
- Country: Iraq
- Interactive map of Shabandar Mosque
- Coordinates: 33°22′17″N 44°21′19″E

Architecture
- Type: Mosque architecture
- Style: Modern Iraqi
- Founder: Mahmoud Ibrahim al-Shabandar
- Completed: 1902 CE

Specifications
- Capacity: 140 worshippers
- Interior area: 300 m^{2} (3,200 sq ft)

The Shabandar Mosque (Arabic: مسجد الشابندر) is a Sunni mosque located in al-Adhamiyah district of the city of Baghdad, in the Baghdad Governorate of Iraq. The mosque was completed in 1902 CE, by the Iraqi Arab Shabandar family, an important wealthy merchant and philanthropic family in Iraq that built several mosques.

== History ==
By the late Ottoman period, the Shabandar family gained prominence in Iraq for being wealthy merchants and used their wealth to construct several mosques around Baghdad, including the Shabandar Mosque in al-Adhamiyya area, named after the family itself.

Built in 1902 by the philanthropist Mahmoud Ibrahim al-Shabandar, the mosque can accommodate at least 140 worshippers within its 300 square metres (3,200 sq ft). Its summer prayer hall, or musalla, can accommodate at least 50 worshippers.

In 1906, Mahmoud Ibrahim al-Shabandar died, and he was buried in the garden of the mosque. The mosque also experienced a major renovation in 1938. Currently, the mosque does not have any endowments, but the funding for restoration or repairs is done by the current member of the Shabandar family, Sayyid Sa'eed Ibrahim al-Shabandar.

== Features ==
Other lesser known features of the mosque include a residential space for the needy, as well as a small private cemetery for the al-Shabandar family that is located in the mosque's garden. There is also a small basement underneath the mosque.

== See also ==
- Islam in Iraq
- List of mosques in Baghdad
