= Al-Shawy Mosque =

Sunni mosque in Baghdad, Iraq

- جامع الشاوي
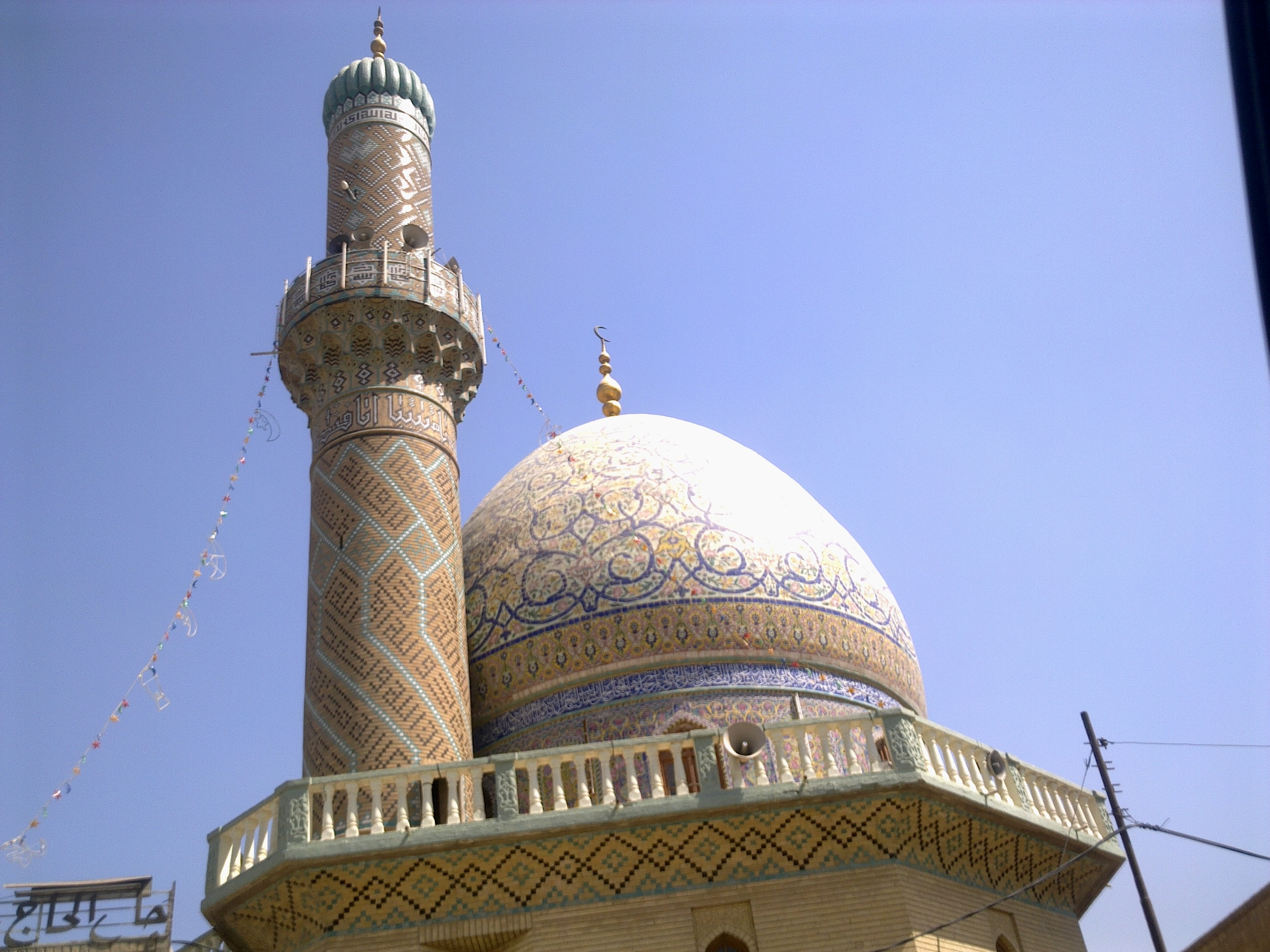

- Location of the mosque in Baghdad

Religion
- Affiliation: Sunni Islam
- Ecclesiastical or organizational status: Mosque
- Governing body: Sunni Endowment Office
- Status: Active
- Notable features: Calligraphy by Hashem Muhammad al-Baghdadi

Location
- Location: Karkh, Baghdad, Baghdad Governorate
- Country: Iraq
- Interactive map of Al-Shawy Mosque
- Coordinates: 33°19′32″N 44°23′50″E

Architecture
- Type: Mosque architecture
- Founder: Ahmed Mazhar Al-Shawy
- Completed: 1957

Specifications
- Dome: One
- Minaret: One

The Al-Shawy Mosque (Arabic: جامع الشاوي), also known as al-Khatib Mosque (Arabic: جامع الخطيب), is a Sunni mosque located in the Karkh district of Baghdad, in the Baghdad Governorate of Iraq. The mosque is considered one of the acclaimed heritage mosques of Baghdad, notable for its architecture including calligraphy by the Iraqi master calligrapher Hashem Muhammad al-Baghdadi.

== History ==
The mosque was built in 1957 by Ahmed Mazhar al-Shawy, a Hajj, and the mosque was named in his honor. Following his death in 1960, he was buried inside of the mosque. The mosque was inaugurated in the presence of King Faisal II and a gathering of the many notables of Baghdad including its scholars, and the opening ceremony was shown on Baghdad TV at the time. The mosque is managed by the Presidency of the Sunni Endowment Office and overlooks its maintenance.

Among the Imams of the mosque was Sheikh Hashem Jamil, a prominent Iraqi jurist, who served as a preacher for two years.

== Description ==
The mosque is located next to the Jumhuriya Bridge on the Karkh side of Baghdad, near the Tigris river and near the Iranian embassy. The main door is located southwest of the main street where the domes tower over the gate. Surat al-Ahzab is written around the dome in Kufic script written by calligrapher Hashem Muhammad al-Baghdadi. Inside, the prayer hall is octagonal in shape and small in size, and it has a big courtyard due to the large length of the mosque. There are also rooms for the Imam and the muezzin and near the door, inside, there is a room containing the tomb of Ahmed Mazhar al-Shawy.

On top of the dome are more Qur'anic verses written by calligrapher al-Baghdadi, including:

"This mosque was established by Mazhar Bey Bin Ahmed Bey al-Sadiq al-Shawy, to get closer to God Almighty and to seek His pleasure under the supervision of the architect Ibrahim Salih al-Obeidi, and it was completed in the year 1372 AH."

== See also ==
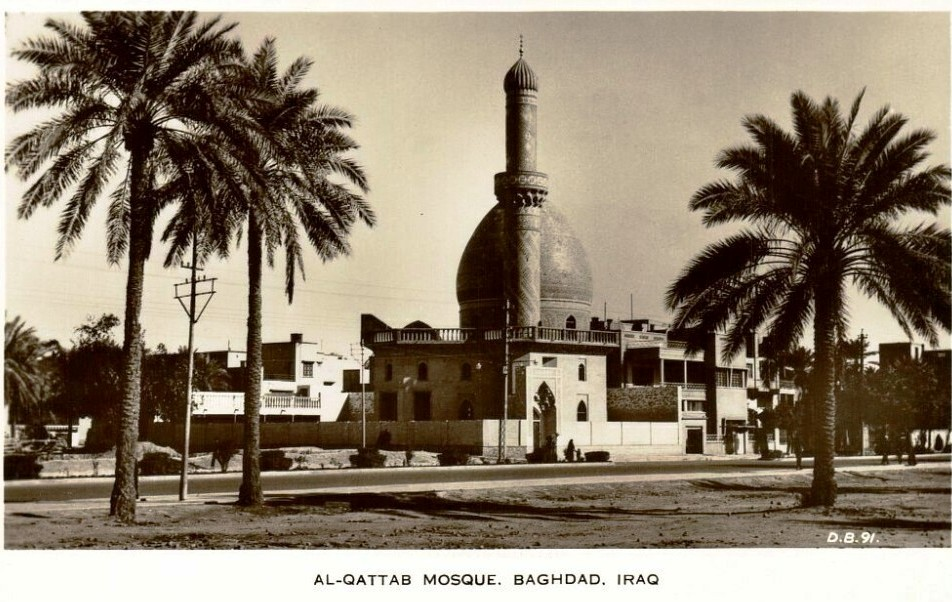
The mosque in 1957

- Islam in Iraq
- List of mosques in Baghdad
