= Ibn Bunnieh Mosque =

Mosque in Baghdad, Iraq

- جامع ابن بنيه
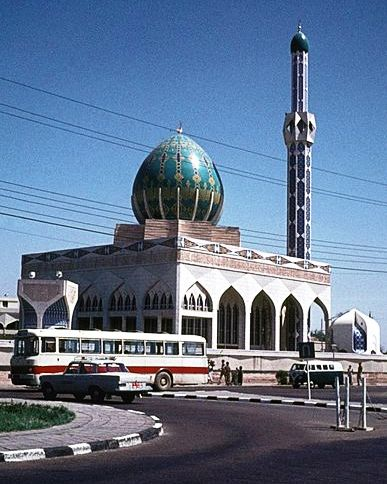
- The mosque in c. 1973

- Location of the mosque in Baghdad

Religion
- Affiliation: Islam
- Ecclesiastical or organizational status: Mosque
- Status: Active
- Notable features: Calligraphy by Hashem Muhammad al-Baghdadi

Location
- Location: al-Karkh, Baghdad, Baghdad Governorate
- Country: Iraq
- Interactive map of Ibn Bunnieh Mosque
- Coordinates: 33°19′25″N 44°23′01″E

Architecture
- Type: Mosque architecture
- Style: Modern Iraqi
- Founder: Hajj Mahmoud al-Bunnieh
- Completed: 1973

Specifications
- Capacity: 1,000 worshippers
- Dome: One
- Dome height (outer): 36 m (118 ft)
- Dome dia. (outer): 25 m (82 ft)
- Minaret: One
- Minaret height: 55 m (180 ft)
- Site area: 5,000 m^{2} (54,000 sq ft)
- Materials: White stone; tiles

The Ibn Bunnieh Mosque (Arabic: جامع ابن بنيه), also known as the Hajj al-Bunnieh Mosque (Arabic: جامع الحاج بنية), is a mosque located in the al-Karkh district of Baghdad, in the Baghdad Governorate of Iraq. Thie mosque is situated opposite the Baghdad Central Station and near the Iraq Museum.

Its unique Modern Iraqi Islamic architectural style includes an egg-shaped oval dome, and, on the mosque walls, inscriptions in Arabic calligraphy of verses from the Qur'an by the Iraqi master calligrapher Hashem Muhammad al-Baghdadi. The name of the mosque was attributed to Hajj Mahmoud al-Bunnieh, who is buried next to the sanctuary from the western side. The mosque can hold 1,000 worshippers.

The Ibn Bunnieh Mosque is considered one of the most important urban landmarks of Baghdad. The mosque was also included in the 1982 official Iraqi Tourist Guide as a significant mosque and a notable landmark recommended for tourists to visit.

== History ==
=== Construction ===
The intention was to build a luxurious mosque at the crossroads of Baghdad. Qahtan al-Madfai was commissioned to build the mosque; Hajj al-Bunnieh was keen to ensure that the mosque was purely Iraqi in terms of its general character, structure, building materials, and decorations. Foreign materials were avoided in its construction except for steel and electrical materials, which were obtained from the local market. As for the rest of the materials, they are Iraqi and local. The white stone used in construction was brought from Mosul and was cut, polished, and engraved in the work yard. Hajj Mahmoud died in December 1971 but his children carried out their father's will to complete the mosque. The mosque was located in front of the Alawi al-Hilla bus garage.

=== Establishment and notable events ===
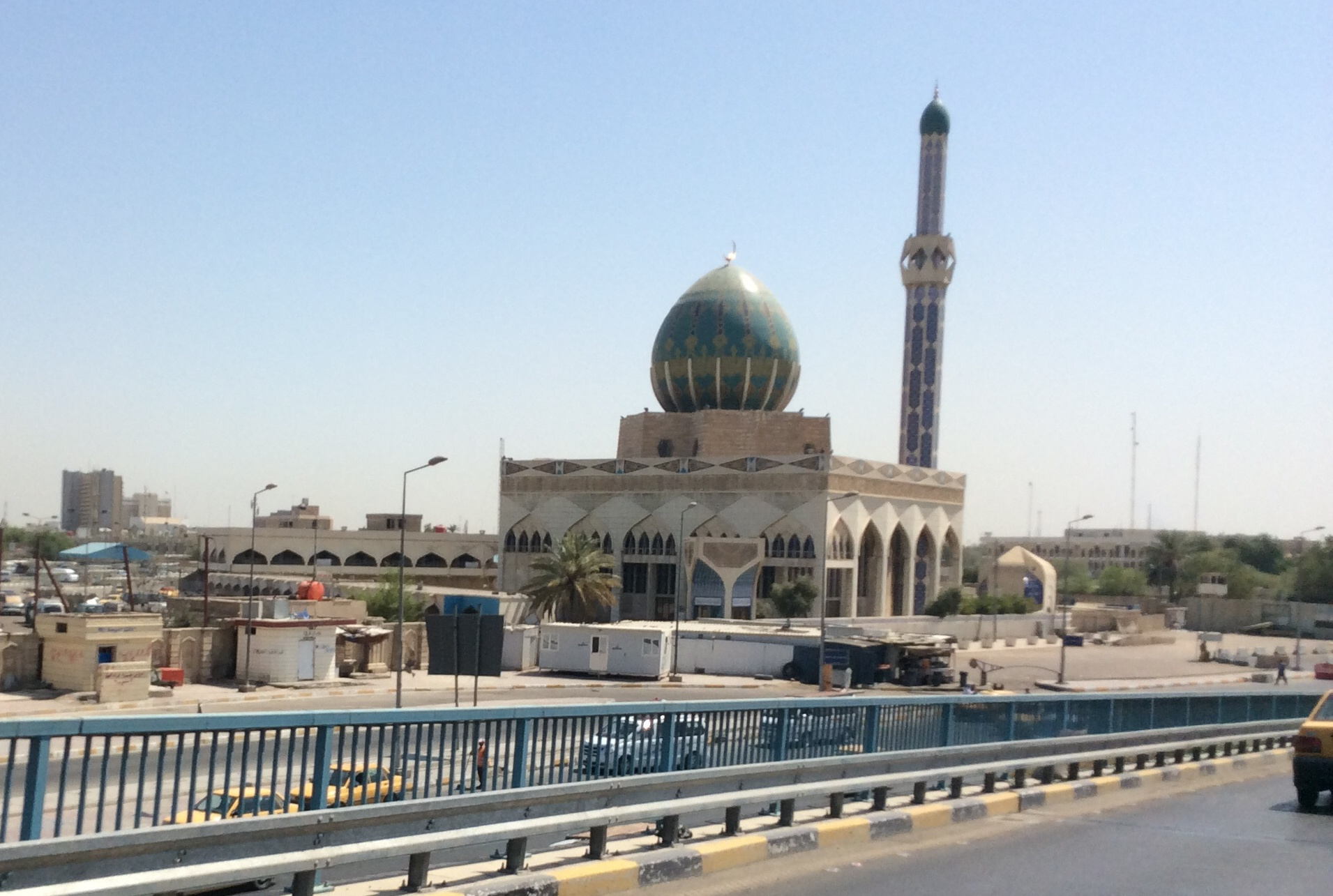
Ibn Bunnieh Mosque as seen from the Damascus Street.

The mosque was completed on May 31, 1974. Its first to ascend the minbar of the mosque was the Egyptian Sheikh named "Mahmoud Muhammad Gharib", who carried out Islamic activities and an Islamic movement in Baghdad, which made the authorities at the time arrest Gharib and then was deported outside Iraq.

On February 23, 2006, acts of violence and vandalism caused material damage to the mosque during the US invasion of Iraq, which led to its closure. The mosque reopened in April 2007. During the Iraq War, many buildings around the mosque were in a state of neglect. The mosque survived, with large crowds of wounded and fleeing soldiers stopping by. Large crowds of visitors, including worshippers and people coming in to rest or clean themselves in the hammam was common.

In late 2020, the mosque was slightly damaged after a missile landed on it. The missile was originally a part of nine Katyusha missiles that targeted the Green Zone. No casualties were reported. On July 7, 2022, a large demonstration of contract owners from the Ministry of Electricity marched from the mosque to the Green Zone and demanded confirmation of the ministry's staff.

== Description ==
Located on a 5,000-square-metre (54,000 sq ft) site, the mosque structure includes a large luxurious mihrab and above the building is a 36-metre-high (118 ft) oval dome what has a diameter of 25 metres (82 ft), decorated with various inscriptions. The mosque's minaret is 55 metres (180 ft) high and has a unique octagonal shape with a diameter of 3 metres (9.8 ft), that is covered with blue tiles brought from Karbala. The outside walls include Qur'anic verses written and carved in by Hashem Muhmmad al-Baghdadi.

The mosque contains a large prayer hall that accommodates more than 1,000 worshipers, along with other rooms such as a library of Islamic and historical books. The mosque has a residence for the Imam and a large hall for holding religious events and mourning councils. It also contains a prayer room for women, a room for administration and servants, and around the sanctuary is a garden and a yard. It also includes stones and tiles with inscribed calligraphy in the Thuluth script which was done by Hashem Muhammad al-Baghdadi.

== See also ==
- Islam in Iraq
- List of mosques in Baghdad
