= Sheikh Ma'ruf Mosque =

Mosque and shrine in Baghdad, Iraq

- جامع الشيخ معروف
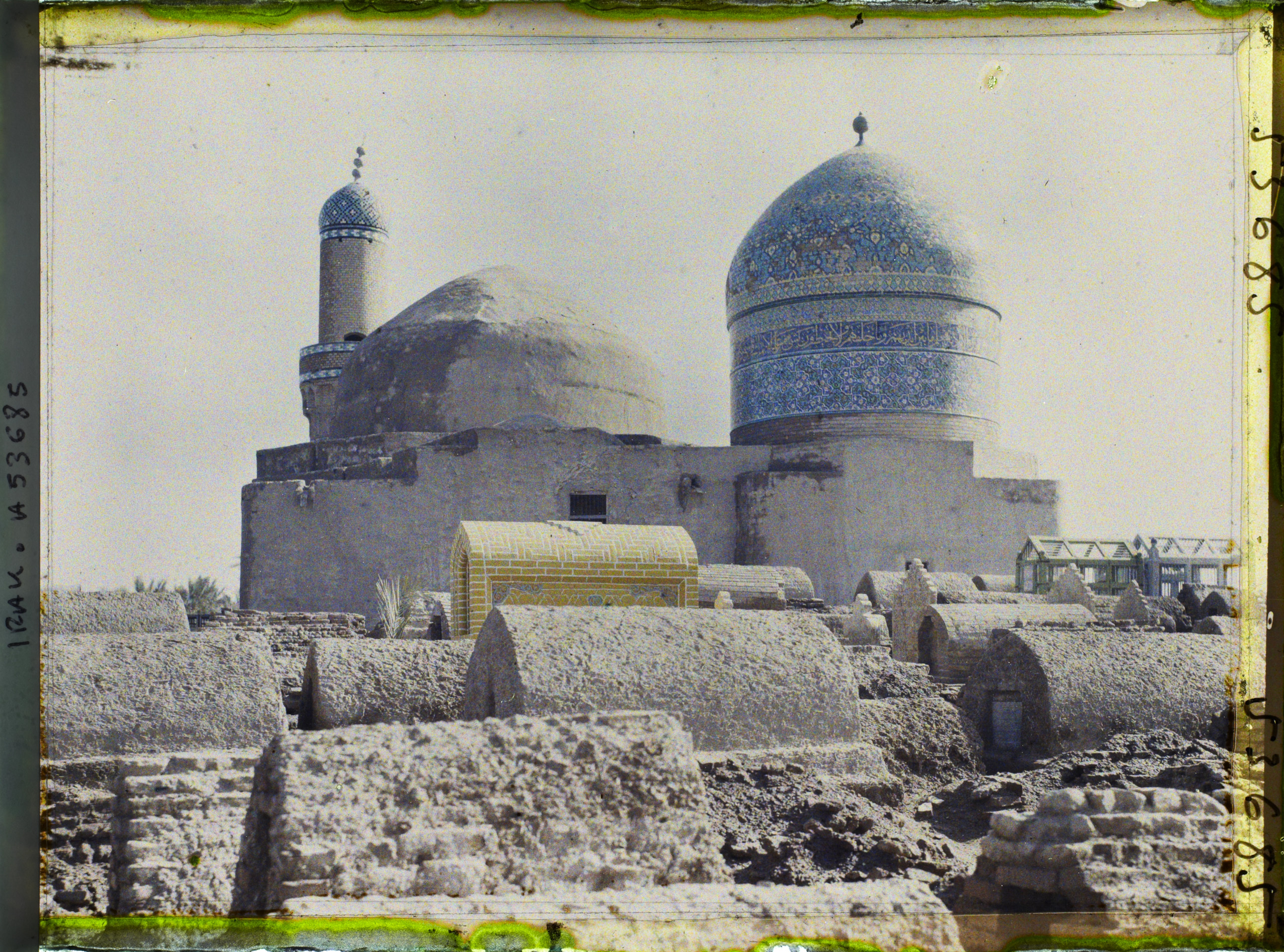
- The mosque before its reconstruction

Religion
- Affiliation: Islam
- Ecclesiastical or organisational status: Active

Location
- Location: Karkh in Baghdad
- Country: Iraq

Specifications
- Dome: 2
- Minaret: 1

The Sheikh Ma'ruf Mosque (Arabic: جامع الشيخ معروف) is an old Abbasid era mosque and shrine dedicated to Sufi Muslim saint Ma'ruf al-Karkhi located around the Sheikh Ma'ruf Cemetery in Karkh, the western side of Baghdad, in Iraq. Al-Karkhi was a central Sufi figure that was featured in the spiritual lineage of Sufi Muslim saint and preacher Abd al-Qadir al-Gilani. Due to his historical significance within Sufi lore, the shrine has become notable in Iraq and the Sufi world.

== History ==
=== Background ===
Early Sufism in Iraq developed in Basra and Kufa but the Sufi schools began to develop in the Abbasid capital of Baghdad which inherited the two cities' ideas and traditions. One of the earliest Sufi Sheikhs that developed the Baghdadi school was Ma'ruf al-Karkhi, who studied under teachers that were part of an inner-circle that studied under al-Hasan al-Basri. Al-Karkhi established himself as a preacher who preached from a mosque's minbar in Karkh. He passed away in 815 CE.

=== Abbasid period (815 - 1258) ===
Ma'ruf al-Karkhi was buried in this spot in 815 CE in a cemetery that was named at the time "Bab al-Dayr" which would later be named after him. After his death, his tomb became a site for ziyarat and supplementary prayers. Next to his tomb was a "Funeral Mosque" that would later house a minaret built under the reign of Abbasid Caliph al-Nasir in 1215 CE. The minaret contained Abbasid examples of muqarnas and Thuluth inscriptions around it.

== Modern period ==
During the war on ISIS in 2016, the Sheikh Ma'ruf Mosque became one of the many mosques in which displaced Iraqis fleeing the war. The administration of the mosque provided the refugees with their necessary requirements and charity work.
