= Qamariyya Mosque =

Mosque in Baghdad, Iraq

- جامع قمرية
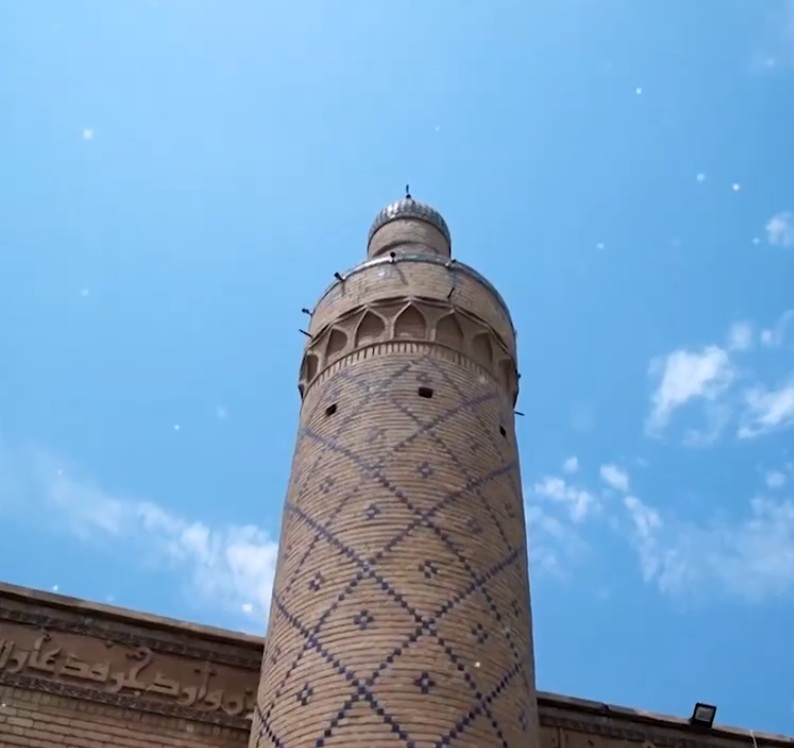
- The minaret of the mosque in 2021

- Location of the mosque in Baghdad

Religion
- Affiliation: Islam
- Ecclesiastical or organizational status: Mosque
- Status: Active

Location
- Location: Karkh, Baghdad, Baghdad Governorate
- Country: Iraq
- Interactive map of Qamariyya Mosque
- Coordinates: 33°20′23″N 44°22′59″E

Architecture
- Type: Mosque architecture
- Style: Abbasid
- Completed: 1242 CE

Specifications
- Capacity: 400 worshipers
- Interior area: 2,000 m^{2} (22,000 sq ft)
- Dome: Six
- Minaret: One
- Materials: Bricks; tiles

The Qamariyya Mosque (Arabic: جامع قمرية) is a mosque, located in the Karkh district of Baghdad, on the banks of the Tigris River, in the Baghdad Governorate of Iraq. Constructed during the late Abbasid era, it is one of the oldest mosques in Baghdad. The mosque is significant in that it constitutes a distinctive sign of the Abbasid era in Baghdad, as it was renovated several times by successive governments, but it has since retained its architectural value.

== History ==
Al-Qamariyya is said to be the name of a woman from the family of the Abbasid Caliph al-Nasir, although it was also said that it is the name of the land that she owned, nevertheless, the mosque was built on the area. Some accounts also list Mansur al-Qumri as a candidate for the origin of the mosque's name. There is a difference in who built it.

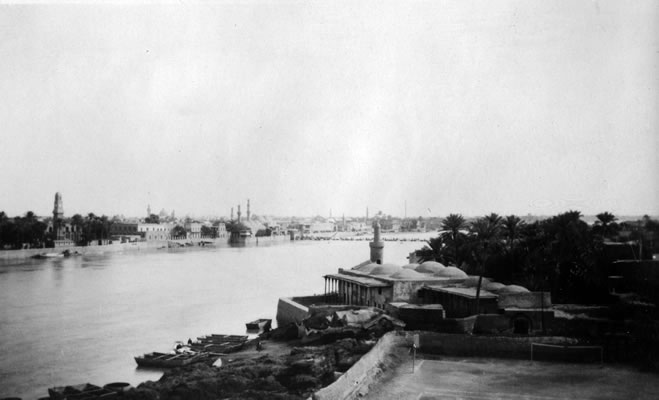
The mosque on the banks of the Tigris in the 19th century.

Some historians say that it is one of the buildings of al-Nasir, and others attribute it to the Caliph al-Mustansir, and it may have been built during the era of al-Nasir between the years 1216 and 1225. Its construction took three eras, so it passed during the era of al-Nasir, then al-Zahir, and then Al-Mustansir I, during whose reign the mosque was built between 1226 and 1242.

Over the years, the mosque was damaged by many floods and the Siege of Baghdad by the Mongols under Hulagu. Ten years after the siege, the mosque was restored by Ata-Malik Juvayni. The Mosque later fell into disrepair and collapsed, and the bases and foundation were eroded until Said Pasha, the Mamluk governor of Baghdad, rebuilt it and directed it into the qibla.

He also wrote the history of the mosque on the chapel's mihrab using poetic verses. In the modern age, the mosque was repaired by the Ministry of Awqaf and Religious Affairs in 1980 and is still active to this day.

== Architecture ==
The mosque is notable for its age and historical importance. Geographically, it is one of the most correct mosques in Baghdad due to its direction to the qibla according to Mahmud al-Aluski. Its area is 2,000 square metres (22,000 sq ft). The mosque has a minaret of bricks and plaster and is topped by six thin domes. The top of the minaret relieved pressure on the base, and the top of the minaret was decorated with blue and white tiles with beautiful decoration and geometric shapes. The minaret is also significant for its unique characteristic and shape, the proportions of its cylindrical mass are different from what is familiar from the traditional Baghdadi minarets. The mosque has a spacious chapel with capacity for approximately 400 worshipers.

The mosque is decorated with poetic verses such as the following:

Mosques for the remembrance of God were established and their building is still full of grace

There is a mosque in it after its arcades rotted along the range, so I shuddered

And it became a rocky bottom, the birds partook over it, and its pillars became stronger, and with remembrance, they calmed down

It was built by the Minister of Justice, then he finished it by paving the pyramids for him

A minister with the caliphate standing, you see Suleiman, the minister, the caliph

His love is Said, may God bless his victory and make us happy with him in the best way

He established the legends of prayer at a mosque and built the pillars of al-Hada and lit

Until the work was completed, I said a happy historian residing in the Qamariya Mosque

Among the inscriptions on the walls of the mosque were written by a Sheikh named "Abd al-Rahman al-Suwaidi", these are the following verses:

And Aisha Al-Khair lived in the place of ablution, so it made many palaces

And in it, from the flow of water, an earthquake quenched the thirsty for eternity

By their faith, they relaxed (their Lord gave them a purifying drink)

== See also ==
- Islam in Iraq
- List of mosques in Baghdad
