= Fattah Pasha Mosque =

Mosque in Baghdad, Iraq

Coordinates: 33°22′20″N 44°20′56″E

- جامع فتاح باشا
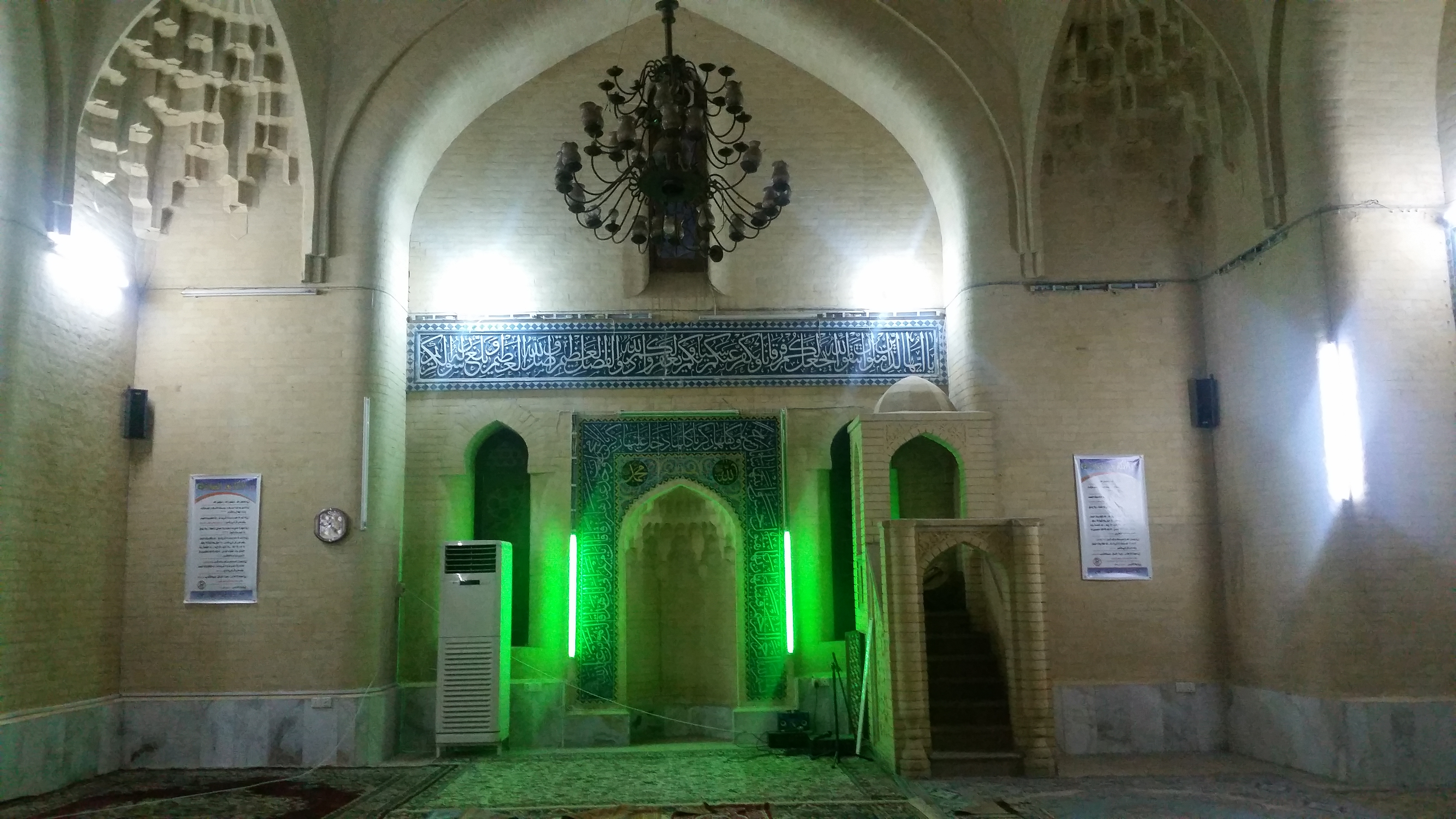
- The inside prayer area of the mosque

Religion
- Affiliation: Islam
- Ecclesiastical or organisational status: Active

Location
- Location: Kadhimiyya in Baghdad, Iraq

Architecture
- Established: After 1943; 83 years ago

Specifications
- Dome: 2
- Minaret: 1

The Fattah Pasha Mosque (Arabic: جامع فتاح باشا) is a congregational mosque located in the Kadhimiyya area of Baghdad, Iraq. It was built in the period of the Kingdom of Iraq by sons of Fattah Pasha, an Iraqi-Ottoman Turcomen statesman known for his charitable work in Baghdad.

== History ==
=== Background ===
The mosque was built for the late Turcomen Ottoman statesman, Fattah bin Sulayman Pasha, who was noted for his integrity and services across Baghdad. Originally a military officer from Kirkuk, his work in the fields of charity, construction, and trade gained him the title of Pasha. After the British occupation of Iraq, the Pasha became devoted to trade and established a textile factory in Kadhimiyya that produced high-quality fabrics. Later, a congregational mosque was connected to this factory that held the five prayers, the Friday prayers, and the Eid prayers. Fattah Pasha passed away in 1936 and was survived by his three sons, Sulayman Bek, Nuri Bek, and Mahmud Bek. Who inherited Fattah Pasha's charitable work.

=== Establishment ===
After his death, his will stipulated that a mosque be built, and he was buried in it. The mosque was built eight years after the death of Fattah Pasha and was opened by his son Sulayman Bek under the Iraqi Hashemite monarchy. The architect of the mosque was a man named Hamoudi Ridha, who also gave it a sabil.

Around June 2007, during the sectarianist violence following the 2003 US invasion of Iraq, the minaret of the mosque was hit by the Sadrist Shi'i militia four days before the twin minarets in Samarra were blown up on June 13. It was among the many mosques in Iraq attacked due to its sectarian associations. Despite the sectarianism, the mosque was reportedly protected by Shi'i Muslim locals from further attacks. The mosque was reopened 20 years later for worshippers from both Kadhimiyya and A'dhamiyya to pray in it. The mosque also became notable for being located between the two holy localities in Baghdad.

== See also ==
- Islam in Iraq
- List of mosques in Baghdad
