= Karkh =

Historical region in Baghdad, Iraq

Coordinates: 33°19′N 44°24′E

Al-Karkh الكرخ
- District
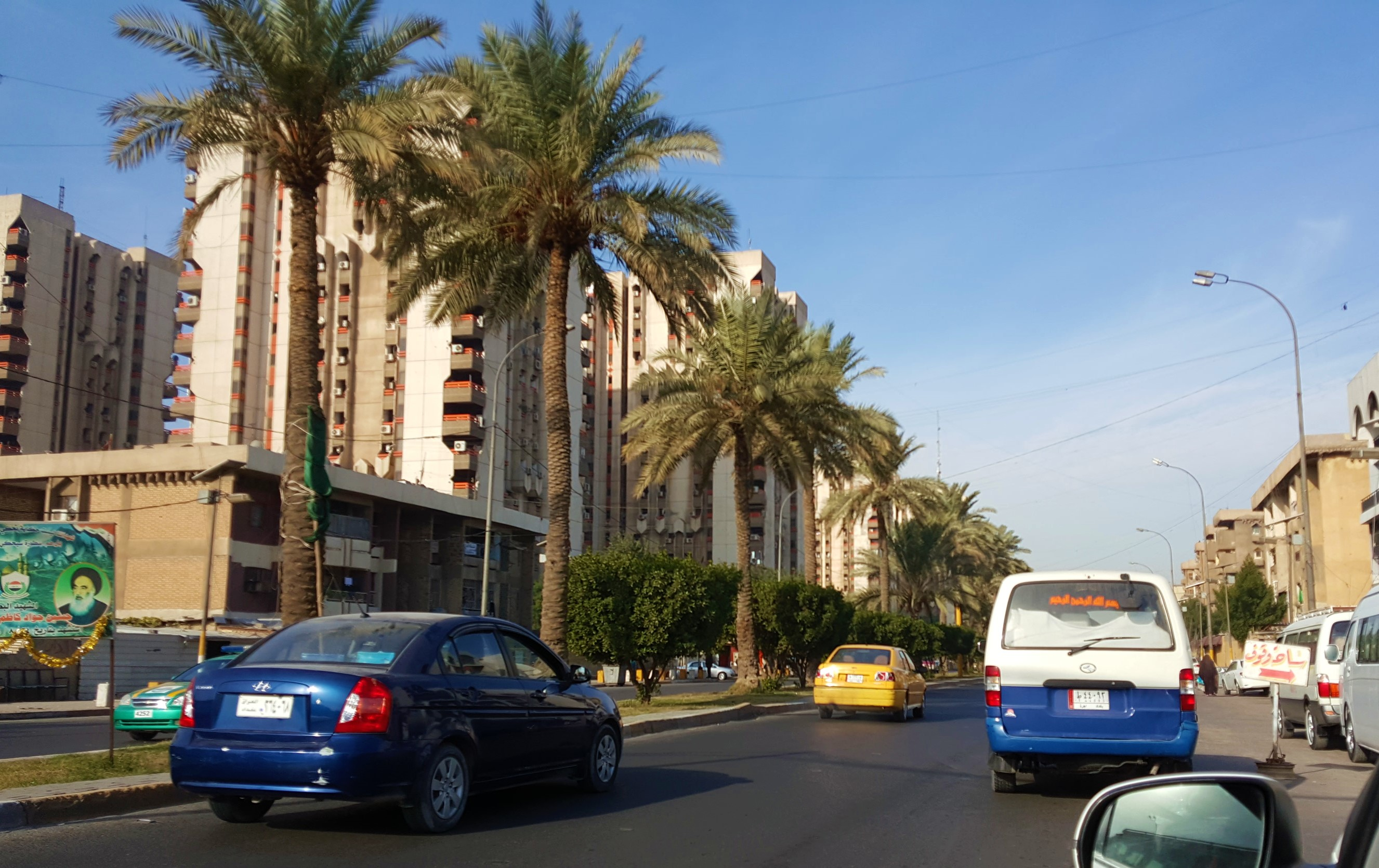
- Haifa Street, one of the main streets of al-Karkh in 2017
- Interactive map of Al-Karkh
- Country: Iraq
- Governorate: Baghdad
- First settled: 773
- Founder: Al-Mansur

Area
  - Total: 384 km^{2} (148 sq mi)

Population (2018)
  - Total: 1,593,676
  - Density: 4,150/km^{2} (10,700/sq mi)
- Time zone: UTC+3

Al-Karkh or just Karkh (Arabic: الكرخ) is historically the name of the western half of Baghdad, Iraq, or alternatively, the western shore of the Tigris River as it ran through Baghdad. The eastern shore is known as al-Rusafa. Historically, al-Karkh has been a commerce market during the Abbasid Caliphate, located outside the main Round City due to safety concerns. It saw many exports and was the main business place for merchants and craftsmen. Al-Karkh has also historically suffered from infighting, fire, and floods that impacted its population and topography.

In a more limited sense, al-Karkh is one of nine administrative districts in Baghdad, with Mansour district to the west, Kadhimiya district to the northwest, and the Tigris to the north, east and south. The Green Zone (International Zone) is in this district. Today, it is also a neighborhood between the International Zone and the Tigris.

== Etymology ==
Al-Karkh's name is derived from the Syriac (ܟܪܟܐ) Karkha; citadel.

== History ==
=== Early history ===
==== First Abbasid period (773–934) ====
Al-Karkh dates back to the early Abbasid period, specifically under Abu Ja’far al-Mansur. Markets played a prominent role in al-Mansur's plan for the newly built Baghdad. Although in 773, safety considerations made al-Mansur move the markets outside the Round City and relocated them to al-Karkh. This was done to keep the turbulent populace away from the Round City to ensure that the gates would not be open at night for markets. Among the markets of al-Karkh were the fruit market, the food market, the money-changers market, the bookshelf market, and the sheep market. The area became a center for merchants and craftsmen. Al-Mansur has also made canals in the area including the Isa canal.

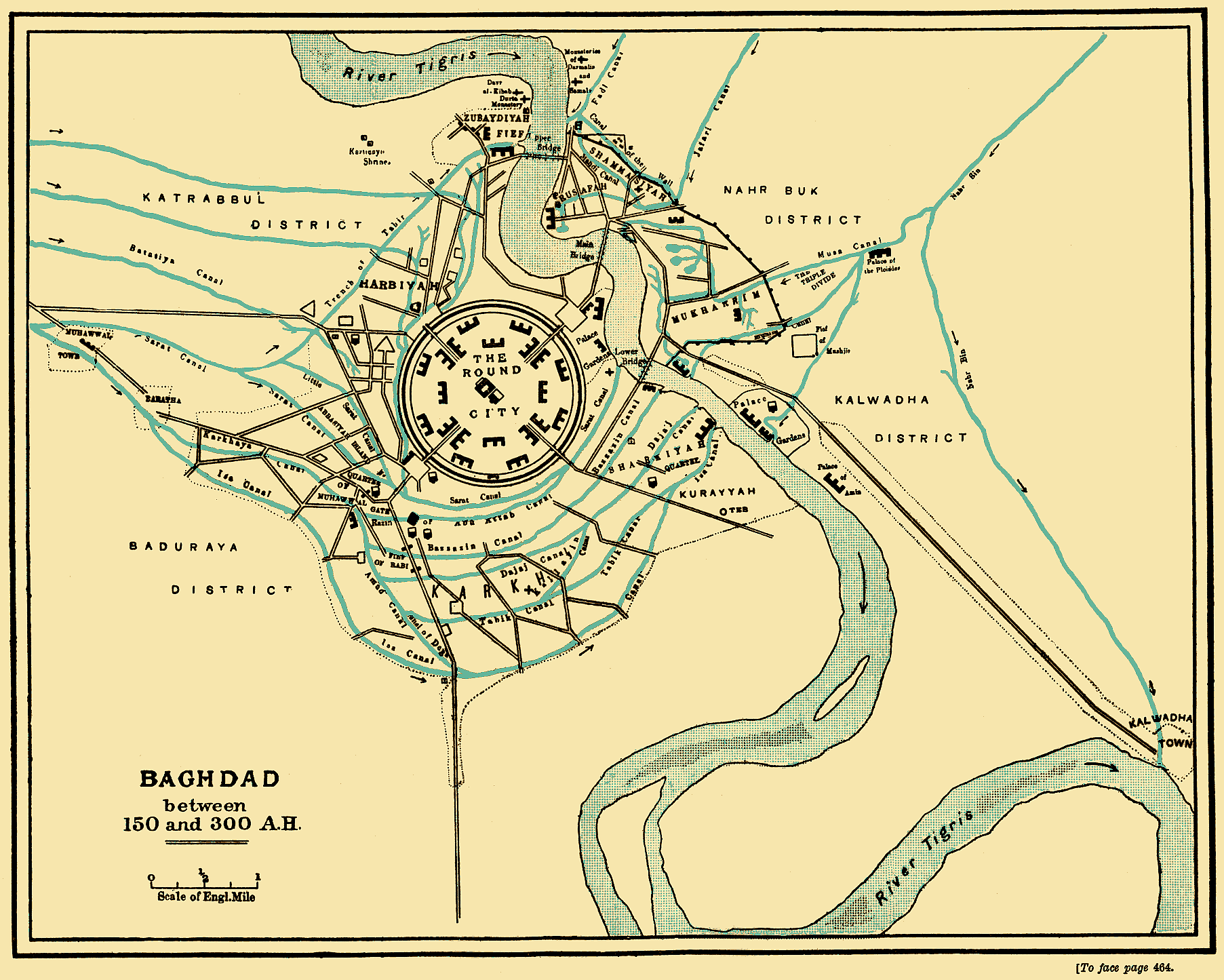
Map of Baghdad in the early Abbasid period.

Under Caliph Harun al-Rashid, there were three bridges in Baghdad that crossed the Tigris River. One of the more popular ones was located at al-Karkh and was called “Bab Khurasan” and it remained active until the 9th century. During the conflict between al-Amin and al-Ma’mun that lasted for fourteen months, many regions of Baghdad, which includes al-Karkh, suffered heavily although the city was revived after al-Ma’mun took the throne.

Markets became an important part of life in Baghdad and markets were especially thriving in al-Karkh. Since the time of al-Mansur, people with the title of “Muhtasib” were appointed to watch over the markets to prevent cheating and check the weighs and measures. Although they also supervised over hammams and possibly watched over mosques. Each market also had a chief hired by the Abbasid government. Baghdad, especially al-Karkh, had also seen a great incentive to commerce and the development of the banking system in the city. Sarrafs had their own markets in al-Karkh. Markets exported silk textiles, cotton, turbans, crystals, potions, glazed wares, and various oils. Among the most famous people from this period was the Sufi sheikh Ma'ruf al-Karkhi. Originally a Christian who converted to Islam, he was an important figure who was buried in a shrine which later became the Sheikh Ma'ruf Mosque which was later renovated by Abbasid Caliph al-Qa'im.

By the last quarter of the 9th century, flood and fire started to materialize. Al-Karkh was flooded in 883 and ruined about 7,000 houses. Between 920 and 921, al-Karkh suffered from a large fire.

==== Buyid period (934–1062) ====
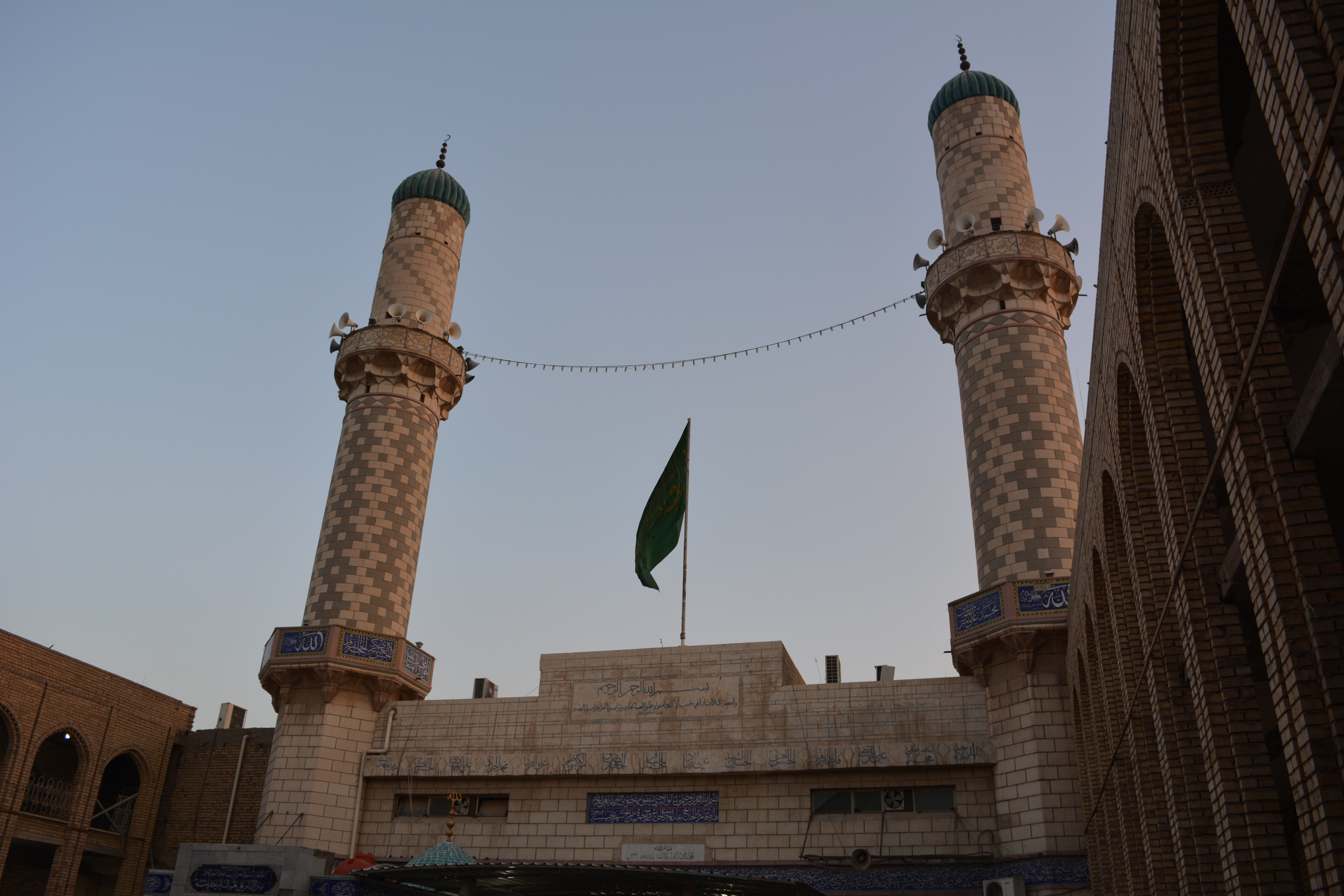
The Buratha Mosque.

Life in Baghdad under the Buyid dynasty was hard. While Mu'izz al-Dawla repaired some canals in 946 which improved living conditions, a period followed where some of the canals located in western Baghdad were neglected and in ruins.

When ‘Adud al-Dawla took the throne of the dynasty, he found Baghdad in bad shape and ordered many of its aspects to be rebuilt, including its markets. Despite this, many aspects of Baghdad at this time have shrunken. Most of west Baghdad had declined and al-Karkh was its only area that flourished. During this period, merchants had their places of business in al-Karkh, and western Baghdad started to be called al-Karkh from now on. Ibn Hawqal had visited Baghdad at this time and noted the mosques of the city, including the Buratha Mosque in al-Karkh.

The Buyid period was also noted for causing sectarian conflicts between Sunni Muslims and Shi’a Muslims. The Shi’a Buyids made the 10th of Muharram a day of public mourning and closed the markets for two days. Due to the conflicts, al-Karkh was pillaged in 959 and in 971, troubles in the area led to its burning which caused the deaths of 17,000 people and the burning of 300 shops, 33 mosques, and many houses. By 973, fire had destroyed most of al-Karkh and the ayyarun had become active at this time in the region and terrorized its people.

The ayyarun were very active in al-Karkh and burnt many markets since the region was also where many of the richer people lived. The ayyarun remained active in the area until the coming of the Seljuks.

==== Later Abbasid period (936–1258) ====
By the time the Abbasids took back their power, many parts of western Baghdad were in ruins. Gardens and houses in al-Karkh became wastelands. Ibn Jubayr had visited Baghdad at this time and noted its decline, he had described al-Karkh as a walled city. Despite the large reconstruction efforts by the Caliphs, al-Karkh still suffered from various floods and fires. In 1059, much of old Baghdad and al-Karkh was also burnt down. In 1228, the Qamariya Mosque was built in al-Karkh overlooking the Tigris River. The mosque was built by Caliph al-Nasir who then passed its construction to Caliph al-Zahir and finally al-Mustansir.

By 1255, sectarianist fights took place between the regions of Baghdad. Al-Karkh saw a lot of these fights and supported Shi’a Muslims. Soldiers were sent to stop the fighting and keep the order but crowds reportedly pillaged al-Karkh and burned down many of its places, killed many persons, and kidnapped women. The ayyaruns were also back. Floods had also worsened conditions on both sides of the city, the worst being in 1256. By 1258, the Mongols had sieged the city.

==== Later periods (1258–1917) ====
During the Ilkhanate period, most of west Baghdad had disappeared and al-Karkh had become the only side of the Western side of the city that was populated. Mustawfi visited al-Karkh and noted that it was surrounded by a wall with a circuited of 12,000 paces.

During the Ottoman period, many houses in Baghdad were poorly built and streets were narrow although the city remained a place for commerce with many foreign merchants coming. Hassan Pasha made a rampant ditch around al-Karkh to protect it from Bedouin marauders.

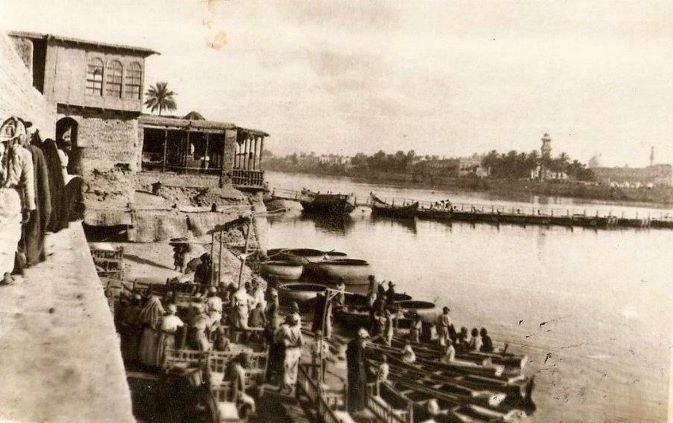
The shores of al-Karkh in 1917.

Under the Mamluks of Iraq state, al-Karkh became a suburb with many gardens. It was defenseless until Sulayman the Great, the Mamluk ruler of Iraq, built a wall and a ditch around al-Karkh and restored peace. Al-Karkh had four gates, Bab al-Kazim (north), Bab al-Sheikh Ma’ruf (west), Bab al-Hilla (southwest), and Bab al-Kraimat (south). The walls were 5,800 yards long, enclosing an area of 246 acres. During his visit in 1818, Sir Robert Ker Porter found al-Karkh well-furnished with shops along numerous streets. Although the area was inhabited by common people and used Kuphars to cross the Tigris River. James Silk Buckingham had also visited the area during his visit to Baghdad, he visited the Zumurrud Khatun Mausoleum where he noted its long and spiky dome. He also noted its cafés and mosques, although he wasn't impressed with the mosques which he compared to mosques in Cairo.

During the plague and the flood of 1831, most of al-Karkh was ruined and the water caused cracks in the area's walls. The governor of Baghdad from 1869 to 1872, Midhat Pasha, founded a tramway that linked Baghdad to Kadhimiya in 1870 that gave services for 70 years. By the 20th century, al-Karkh began further upstream than eastern Baghdad but was smaller in depth and length. There were reportedly 18 mosques in al-Karkh along with 25 squares that retained their old names.

=== History after the Independence of Iraq ===
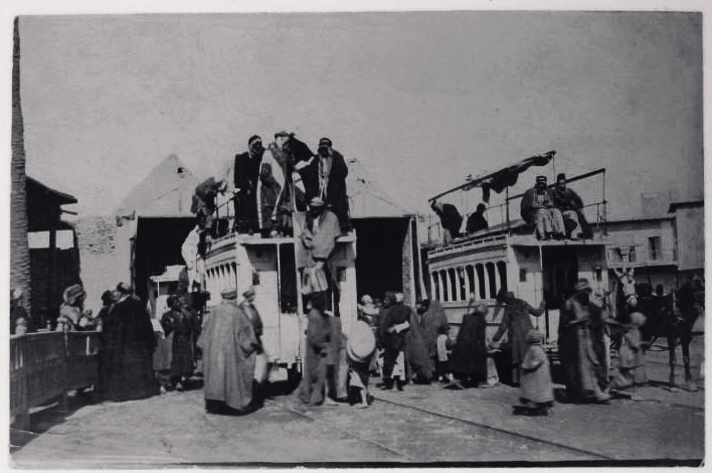
The Kadhimiya Tramway, 1917

During the Royal era of Iraq, al-Karkh was the home to various cafés, three of which existed in al-Ja’ifar locality. The Arab game al-Sas was played during the holidays here and it was common to find women selling yogurt on the streets. Projects have also started to materialize in al-Karkh such as erecting the statue of King Faisal I in the Salhia area of al-Karkh which was sculpted by Italian sculptor Pietro Canonica in 1933 to symbolize the important role of the Iraqi King and al-Shawy Mosque which was opened in the presence of King Faisal II and a bunch of Baghdadi scholars in 1957.

A palace was built in the Kharadah Mariam area of Baghdad, a wealthy district in al-Karkh called the "Royal Palace." The palace was built for King Faisal II to reside in following his marriage to the Egyptian Princess Fazile Hanımsultan. However, a day before the wedding, King Faisal II and his family were assassinated during the 14 July Revolution led by Abd al-Karim Qasim who renamed it the “Republican Palace.” Qasim never resided in this palace. On the morning of July 14, 1958, angry demonstrators toppled the statue of King Faisal I. The demonstrators dropped it to be smashed into small pieces, as an expression of their anger and announcing the fall of the monarchy and the beginning of the republic.

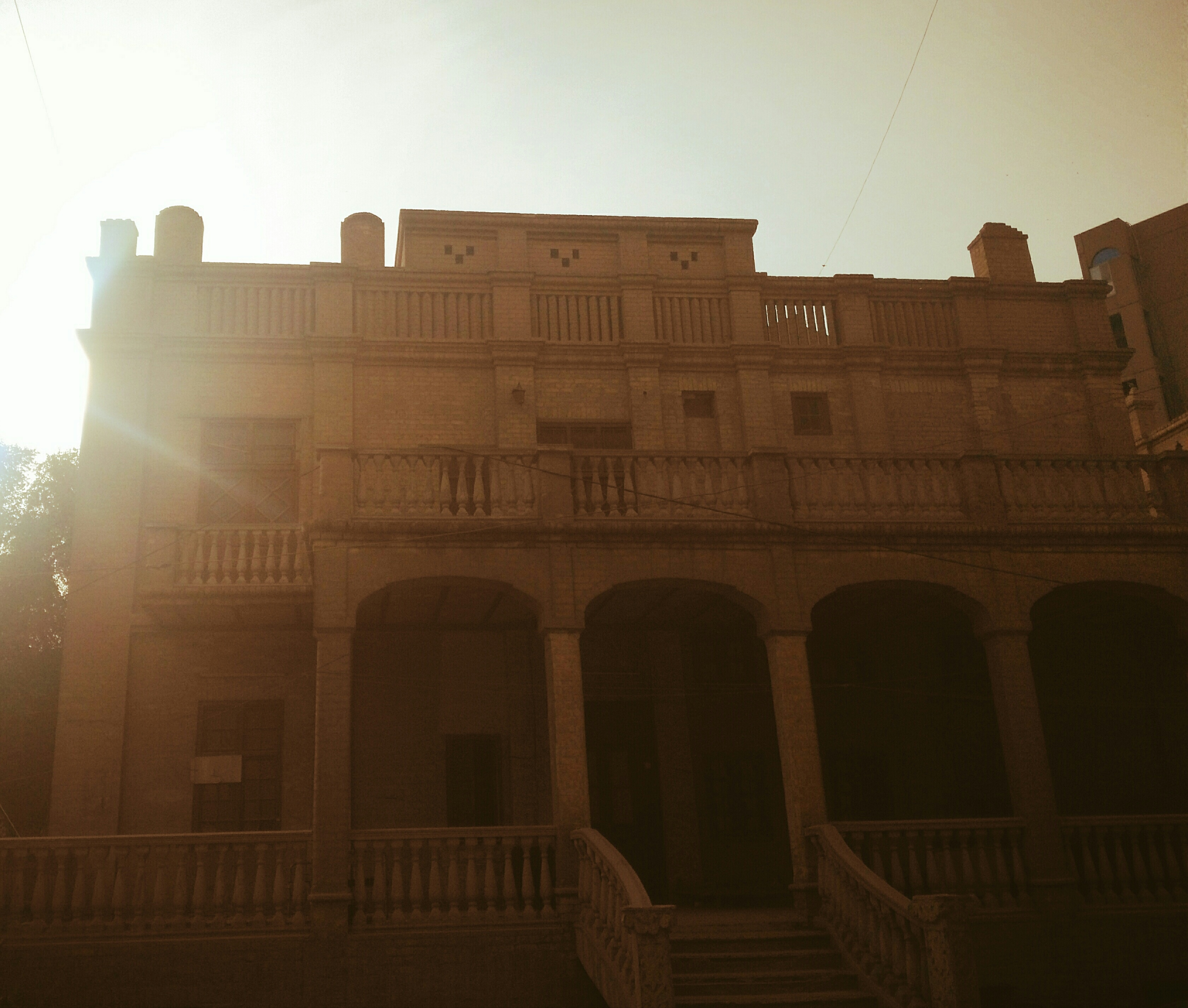
An old house on Haifa Street.

When al-Karkh was first identified as a district, it was originally named "al-Za'im District" in relation to the former leader, Abd al-Karim Qasim, as it was mentioned in the Iraqi Republic Guide for the year 1960. The older areas of al-Karkh became heritage and historical sites and were home to many well-known figures such as Mulla Abboud al-Karkhi and the poet Kazem Ismail al-Katea. The house of former-Iraqi presidents Abd al-Salam and Abd al-Rahman Arif is located here. In 1973, work began to develop what would become Haifa Street which had many apartments and 77 buildings. Named after the Palestinian city, the streets stretched 2 kilometers from King Faisal I Square to Sheikh al-Waeli Square. Although the first year and a half of the project were troubled with demolition. The street contained eight complex parts with 10 to 15 floors each and were designed to be personally and socially connected. Architect Mo'ath al-Alusi was brought to design the residential buildings on Haifa Streets in the "Haifa Project". He decided to design the urban fabric of the street based on the traditional urban fabric of al-Karkh and decided to not violate it due to not wanting to destroy Baghdad's identity and tradition. Despite his efforts, many of the traditional homes of al-Karkh have since disappeared with the surviving homes suffering from neglect.

Near the end of the Iraq-Iran War in 1987, and in appreciation of the position of Jordan and its king in support of Iraq in its war, the Iraqi government decided to return the monument of the founding king, Faisal I, to its place in the Salhia area in al-Karkh. A move was made to the museum of the artist Pietro Canonica for the purpose of making a bronze copy according to the marble version in the museum's stores. The statue was restored and remains to this day in King Faisal I Square in front of Haifa Street.

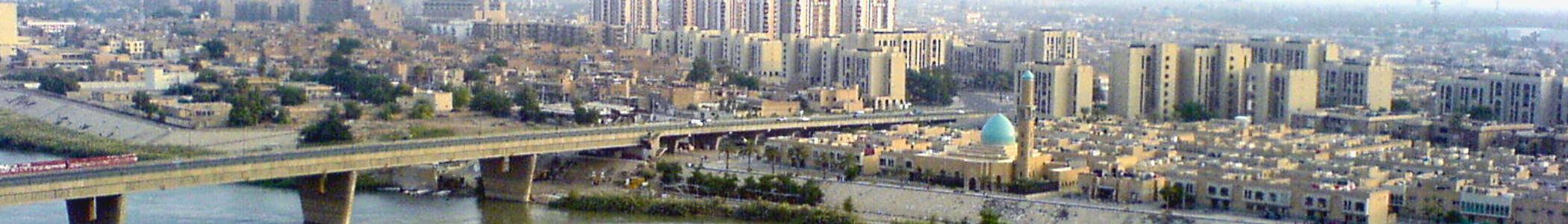
Bird eye view of Haifa Street

==== Iraq War ====
During the US-led invasion of Iraq, American troops and their allies took over the Green Zone which was located in al-Karkh and it became the center of the occupation authority, which was assumed by US Governor Paul Bremer in 2003, as well as the US Embassy, which is the largest embassies in the world. Many of the residents of the area were evacuated and the villas and palaces of the area were taken by the American occupation forces as bases. Despite that, identifying identities were usually granted to the workers inside it and were allowed to enter. Workers numbered in that time about 5,000 employees. During the early stages of the Iraq War, many demonstrators and workers protested around Bab al-Qasr, also known by its American name "The Assassin's Gate", demanding the opening of factories and protesting against the occupation and taking areas without their consent.

Al-Karkh was subjected to numerous security breaches and terrorist attacks during this period. In 2007, an Iraqi parliament café was targeted by a suicide attack, which killed about eight people, including a member of parliament. On April 7, 2007, in the wake of Sectarianist violence in Iraq, after Friday Prayers were done, the ancient Buratha Mosque was targeted by a triple suicide bombing that left 85 people dead and 160 injured. The motivations for the devastating attack were Sectarian in nature as the mosque is a prominent Shi'a Muslim area.

===== Battle of Haifa Street =====
By 2005, Sunni insurgents were using Haifa Street as a safe haven. American forces attested patrolling the area in mid-October 2006. Even then, Haifa Street was marked by violence. Snipers shot at American forces from rooftops and threw grenades at them from the high-rises. On January 6, 2007, Iraqi soldiers on patrol along Haifa Street discovered a fake checkpoint guarded by Sunni insurgents which resulted in a gunfight that killed 30 insurgents. That night in retaliation, insurgents dumped the bodies of 27 executed Shi'a Muslims. On January 8, Iraqi forces attempted to remove insurgent forces from Haifa Street, but the attack was repulsed and 2 Iraqi soldiers were killed. US forces were then called in to help clear out the street. Major weapons were identified inside al-Karkh High School, cordoned off the area, and allowed only pedestrian traffic on Haifa Street. Approximately 500 Iraqi and 400 U.S. soldiers took part in the battle along a two-mile stretch of Haifa Street. The images of the fighting were shown across the world on various news media, including YouTube. In late January, 200 CBS News correspondent Lara Logan had also filed a report about fighting alongside the coalition forces on Haifa Street.

== The Green Zone ==
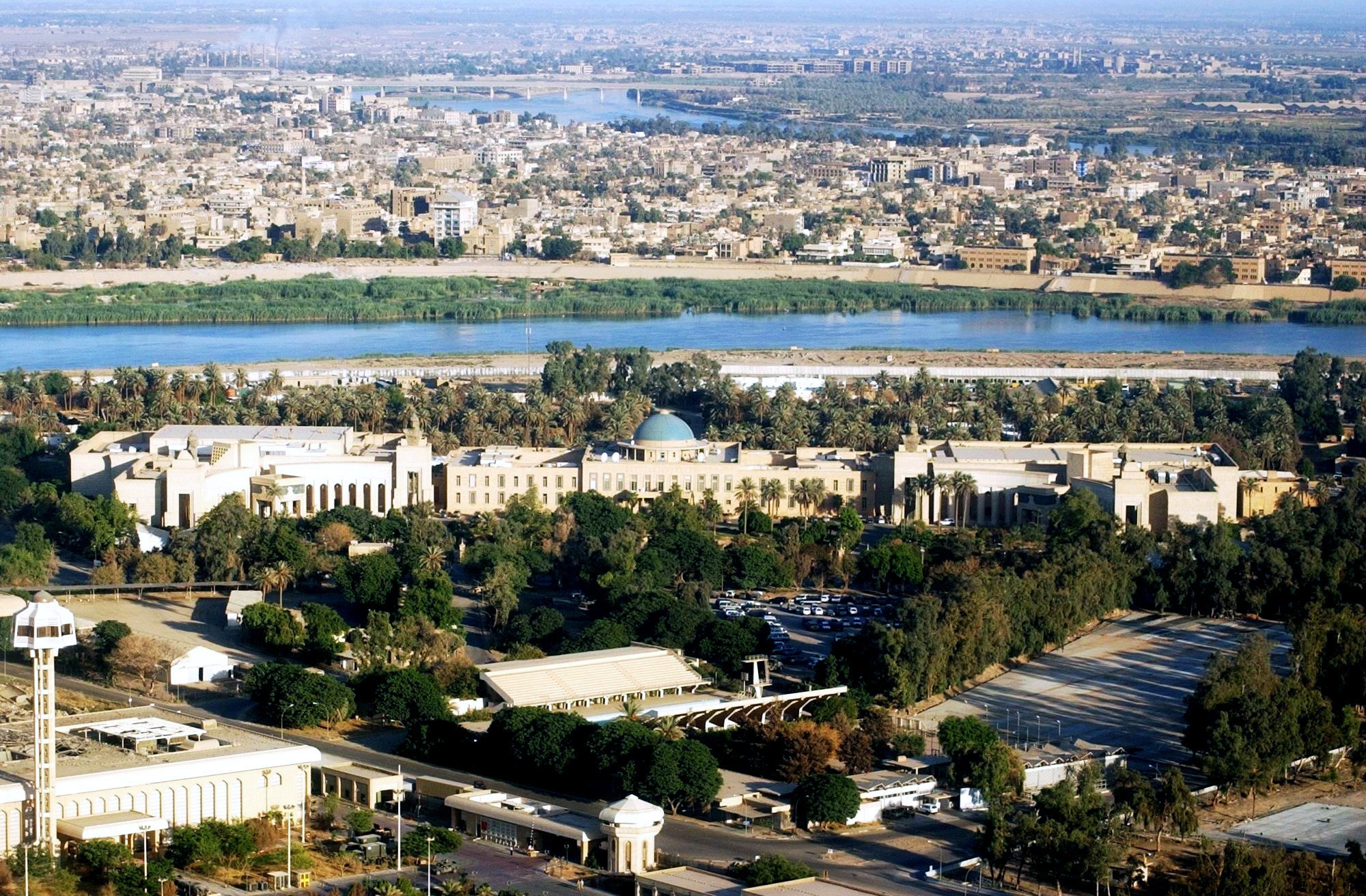
View of the Green Zone in al-Karkh

The Green Zone is a heavily fortified area where most of the Ba'ath Party operated, lived, and worked. The area includes villas, palaces, and monuments, some used to be inhabited by former Ba'ath Party members including former Iraqi President Saddam Hussein. The area was taken by US military forces in April 2003 in some of the heaviest fighting during the capture of Baghdad. In the lead-up to the US invasion of Iraq, many high-status residents of the area were evacuated because of the anticipated aerial bombardment of the area by US forces. Most of the remaining residents fled as US ground forces closed in on the Iraqi capital out of fear of arrest by Coalition forces or possible reprisals by disgruntled Iraqis. The Green Zone Café was also opened here where alcohol and the hookah were served. The Republican Palace, which served as the center of operations, became a base for American forces and allied officials. The Republican Palace is located here, the palace is one of the most prominent buildings in the heavily fortified Green Zone due to it being the headquarters for the Iraqi president. The palace was built by the last king of Iraq, Faisal II, in the early 1950s, and later President Saddam Hussein expanded it during the nineties. It was the seat of the government during the era of Saddam Hussein's regime and a symbol of the country's sovereignty until its fall in April 2003 when it became the seat of the US embassy. During the US-led invasion of Iraq, the palace became a base of operations for American troops and their allies before it was handed to Prime Minister Nouri al-Maliki in 2009.

The area is also home to al-Zaqura Building. The building was commissioned by former-Iraqi President Ahmed Hassan al-Bakr for the purpose of being a building for the Council of Ministers, or cabinet. The Green Zone is also home to the Grand Festivities Square near al-Zawra'a Park. Its construction began in 1986 and the location was specifically selected for its symbolic value. Iraqis generally believe it is the same location where the Muslim Arabs defeated the Persians in 636 and this historic event is seen to be the beginning of Islamic domination of the region. The Swords of Qādisīyah monuments are located here. The square consists of a large parade ground, an extensive review pavilion, and a large reflecting pool. The surrounding grassy areas hosted Iraqis during military parades. Adding to the festive appeal of the grounds were three refreshment booths that sold ice cream, cold beverages, and candy. Three monuments were constructed to remember Iraq's pain and suffering as a consequence of the eight-year war. The Swords of Qādisīyah was the last of the three structures to be built, and it was followed by the construction of the Monument to the Unknown Soldier which is also located here. The Swords of Qādisīyah also became a tourist attraction.

The Grand Festivals Square is also home to al-Mansour Cinema and al-Mansour Theater which were a cultural phenomenon until they were closed in 2003 after the invasion. In early 2023, the area was restored along with the cinema and theater in an attempt to revive the cultural role that the area played and the fact that the newer generation isn't aware of the area's cultural role. It is expected that the celebration square will witness the holding of cultural festivals in the coming months, Baghdad, with the help of Sharjah, will witness the establishment of the Baghdad International Festival in 2024. The Iraqi Cinema Company, which was established in 2010 with being the first company specialized in building and rehabilitating cinema halls in Iraq, took control of al-Mansour Cinema and rebuilt it as it represents a memory for all previous generations.

Locations in the Green Zone

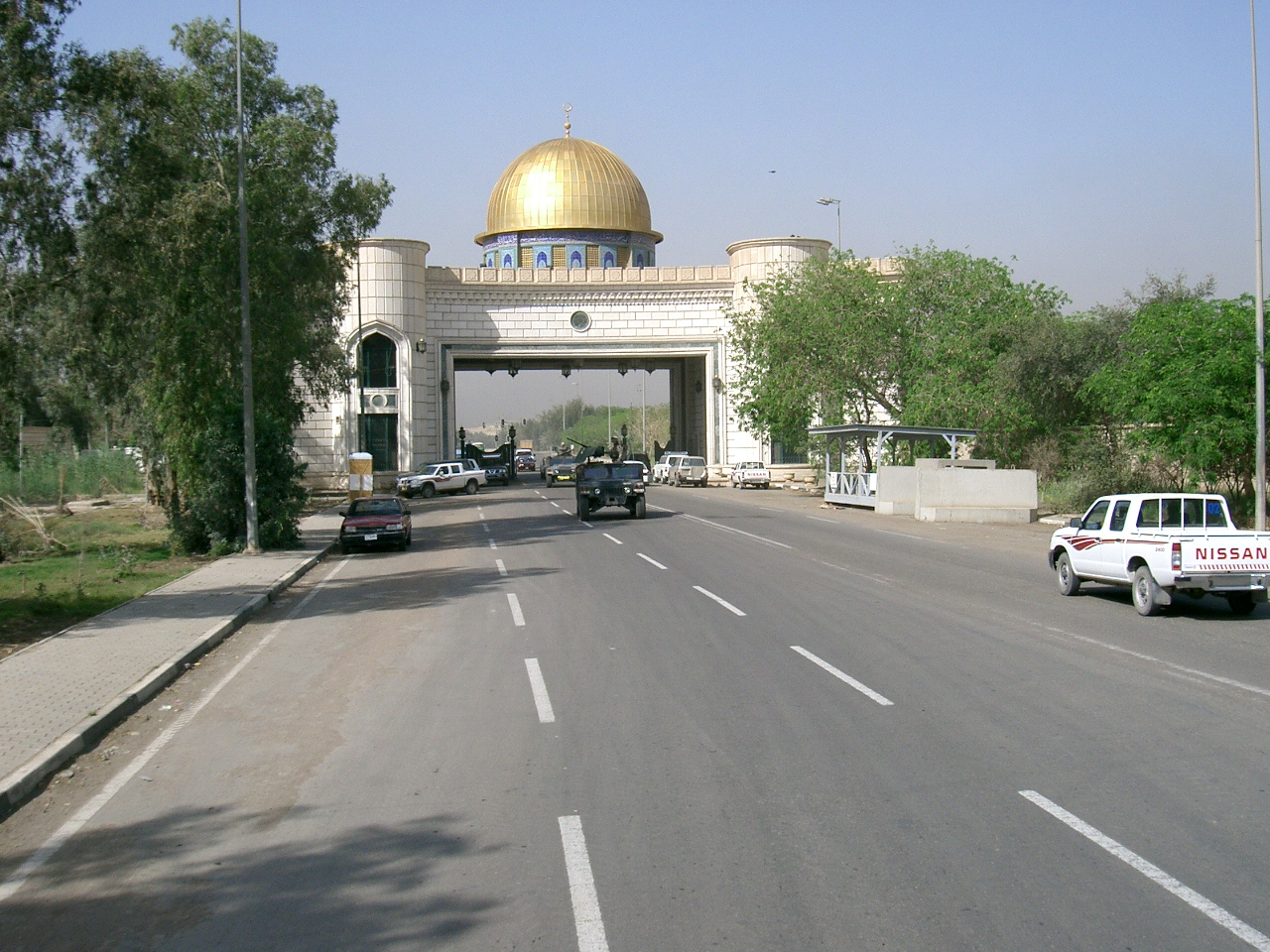
Bab al-Quds, the second gate to the Green Zone

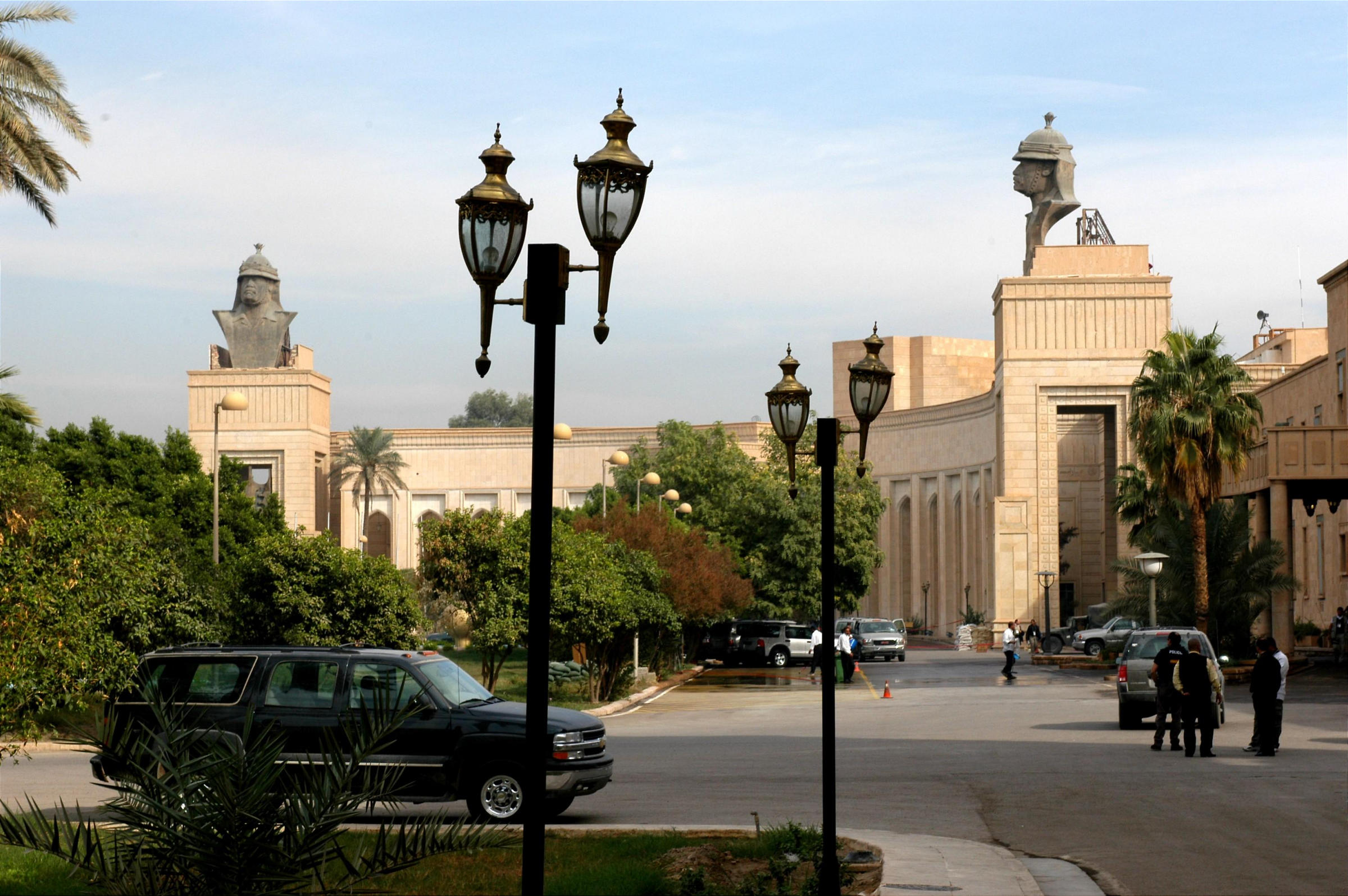
The Republican Palace during the Saddam Era before the Saddam Statues were removed

== Sights of interest ==
Al-Karkh is home to many notable landmarks and areas. Al-Rasheed Hotel, the tomb of Michel Aflaq, Ibn Sina Hospital, the Baghdad Clock, The Swords of Qādisīyah monuments, the Monument to the Unknown Soldier, al-Salam Palace, al-Mansour Cinema, al-Mansour theater and the Akito Fine Art Hall are all located in this area. As well as containing a number of embassies and international organizations, the headquarters of the prime minister, parliament, and some independent ministries and bodies, in addition to the homes of prominent officials and politicians in the Iraqi government.

=== Al-Beiruti Café ===
Al-Beiruti Cafe (Arabic: مقهى البيروتي) is one of the oldest surviving cafés in Baghdad. The café was visited by James Silk Buckingham in 1819 and was impressed by its lights which were on the waves of the Tigris River. In the spring of 1954, the levels of the Tigris River rose due to the abundance of rain, which led to the flooding of the city of Baghdad and the destruction of the café. The café was restored in 1978. The café remains a cultural landmark that merchants and visitors visit and rest. In addition to being a place frequented by adults and children for leisure and entertainment, it is a small forum in which issues related to economic, political, and other affairs are usually discussed.

=== Al-Zawra'a Park ===
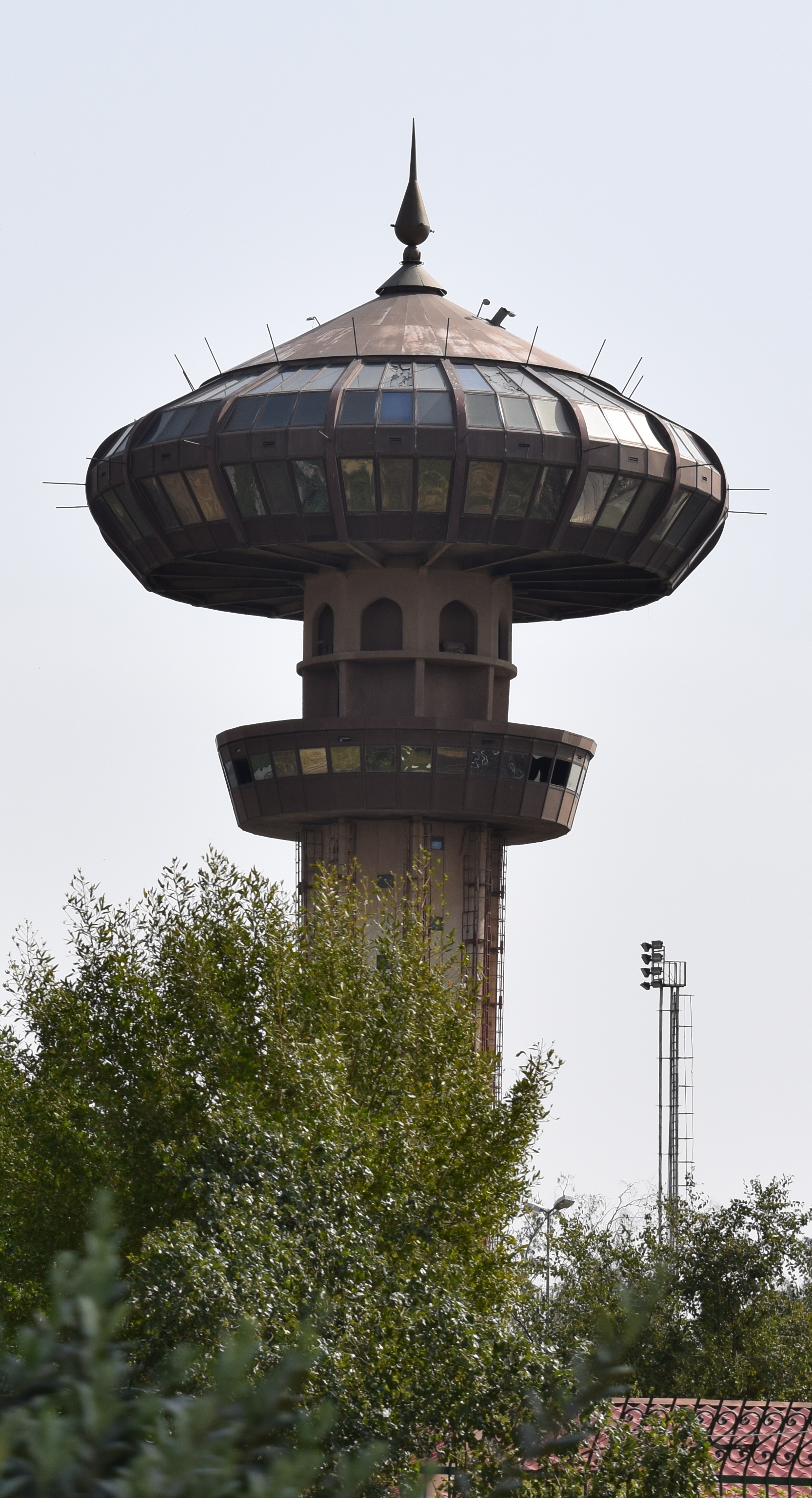
Al-Zawra'a Tower.

Al-Zawra'a Park is a public park located near the al-Alawi locality of al-Karkh and near the Baghdad Central Station. The park was established in the 1960s and 1970s and before that, it used to be an army camp before becoming a public park. The park is an important tourist attraction that contains a Games City. The park also contains one of the only zoos in Iraq, the Baghdad Zoo which was established around the 1970s. Before the US-led invasion on Iraq, 650 to 700 animals were in the Baghdad Zoo but only 35 had survived to the eighth day of the invasion, and these tended to be some of the larger animals. Some of the animals were kidnapped and sold for food and profit. In recent years, the Zoo has recovered.

The Baghdad Planetarium is also located in this park. Established in 1979 and was considered a landmark of Baghdad in its design, location, and cognitive role in scientific and astronomical development in the city. In 2003, the planetarium was a victim of looting, burning, and vandalism that led to its closing and abandonment.

==== Al-Zawra'a Tower ====
In the park, al-Zawra'a Tower is located and is 54 meters high. The top of the tower is a large Islamic dome that gives a panoramic view of Baghdad that can be seen by visitors. It was supposed to give the visitors the feeling of flight over the city. The tower has a 12-person elevator with the top of the tower has three floors. One is a 170-person cafeteria, the other is a 135-person restaurant. The last floor includes cooling equipment and is made for air-conditioning. The tower was closed in 2004.

== Places of worship ==
- Buratha Mosque (Arabic: جامع براثا) is one of the oldest and most important buildings for both Muslims and Christians and considered an important landmark for the history of Islam before the finding of the Abbasid Caliphate, as well as a prominent Shi'a Muslim location. The building is believed to have originally been a Church owned by a man named "al-Habub" until the 4th Rashidun Caliph, Ali bin Abi Talib, returned from fighting the Persians and ordered that a mosque be built in the area. The mosque is said to have been founded in 654 and throughout both the Abbasid and Ottoman eras, the mosque was demolished and rebuilt multiple times. In recent years, the mosque has seen many restorations. The mosque also contains many ancient stones with historical significance on display.
- The Hanan Mosque (Arabic: جامع حنان) is an old heritage mosque located near al-Shuhada' Square. It contains a chapel in which the five daily prayers, Friday prayers, and the two Eid prayers are held. Its building was renewed by a man named Abd al-Hanan in 1782. And its councils were held for preaching and guidance, the scholar Sheikh Najm al-Din the preacher used to conduct lessons for preaching and gather in it a lot of manners. in the mosque.
- The Ibn Bunnieh Mosque (Arabic: جامع ابن بنيه) is a mosque located in al-Alawi locality in al-Karkh. Built in 1971 and opened on May 31, 1974. the mosque is distinguished by its unique Islamic architecture and style, and contains paintings in Arabic calligraphy of verses from the Qur’an on its walls, made by the calligrapher Hashem Muhammad al-Baghdadi, and is considered one of the most important urban landmarks of Baghdad. The mosque contains a library full of Islamic and historical books and can contain 1,000 worshippers.
- Qamariya Mosque (Arabic: جامع قمرية) is one of the oldest surviving mosques in Baghdad. It is significant because it is one of the last remaining examples of Abbasid architecture in Baghdad. The minaret is decorated with blue tiles. There was a difference of opinion about the reason for naming the mosque, and there were three opinions, one of which says that al-Qamariya is the name of a woman from the family of Caliph al-Nasir or a member of his harem. Another opinion states that the name is attributed to the scholar Abu Mansur al-Qumri, the contemporary of Ibn Sina. The mosque was last renovated in 1980 by the Ministry of Endowments and Religious Affairs, and the five daily prayers are still performed in it.
- Al-Shawy Mosque (Arabic: جامع الشاوي) is a mosque located between al-Jumhuriya Bridge and al-Ahrar Bridge on the banks of the Tigris River, near the Iraqi Radio building. The mosque was inaugurated in 1957 in the presence of King Faisal II and a gathering of notables and scholars of Baghdad, and the opening ceremony was shown on Baghdad TV at that time. The mosque is notable for its architecture.
- Sheikh Ma'ruf Mosque (Arabic: جامع الشيخ معروف) is an old Abbasid mosque located in the Sheikh Ma'ruf Cemetery. The mosque contains the tomb of Baghdadi Sufi Sheikh Ma'ruf al-Karkhi, who died in 815. The mosque was renovated several times throughout its history with the first taking place following orders from Abbasid Caliph al-Qa'im. The mosque is distinguished by its unique and strange architecture, which includes a mix of Iraqi architecture and newer elements.
- Sandal Mosque (Arabic: جامع صندل) is an old mosque now located on Haifa Street where feasts, religious events, and all Islamic prayers are held. Named after Sheikh Sandal bin Abdullah al-Muqtafawi and built in 1891, the mosque was significant during the revolt against the British colonialization of Iraq and attracted many poets. The mosque used to contain a dome although it no longer exists.
Mosques in al-Karkh

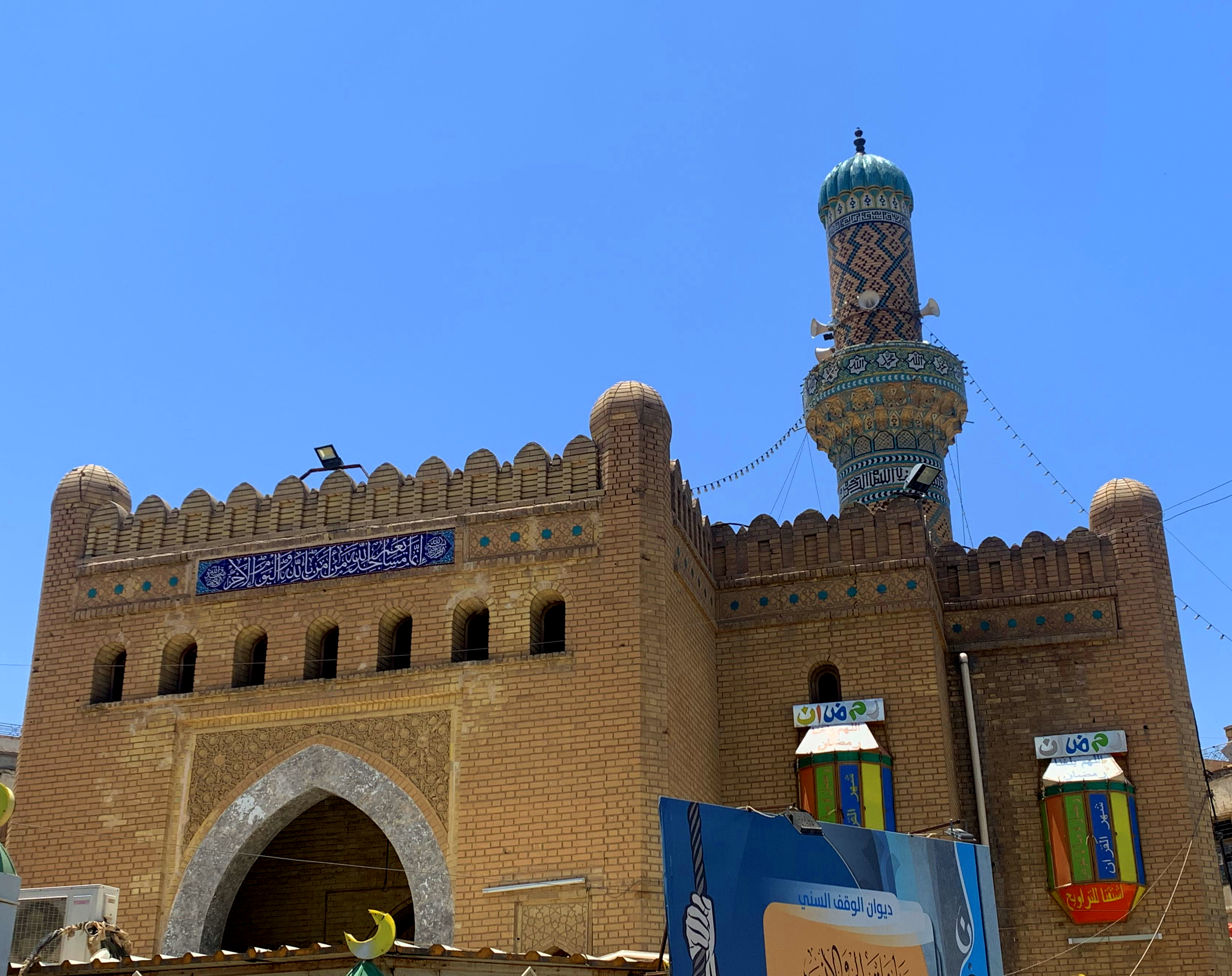
Hanan Mosque

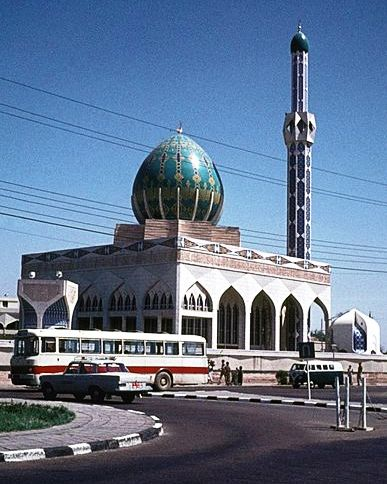
Ibn Bunnieh Mosque

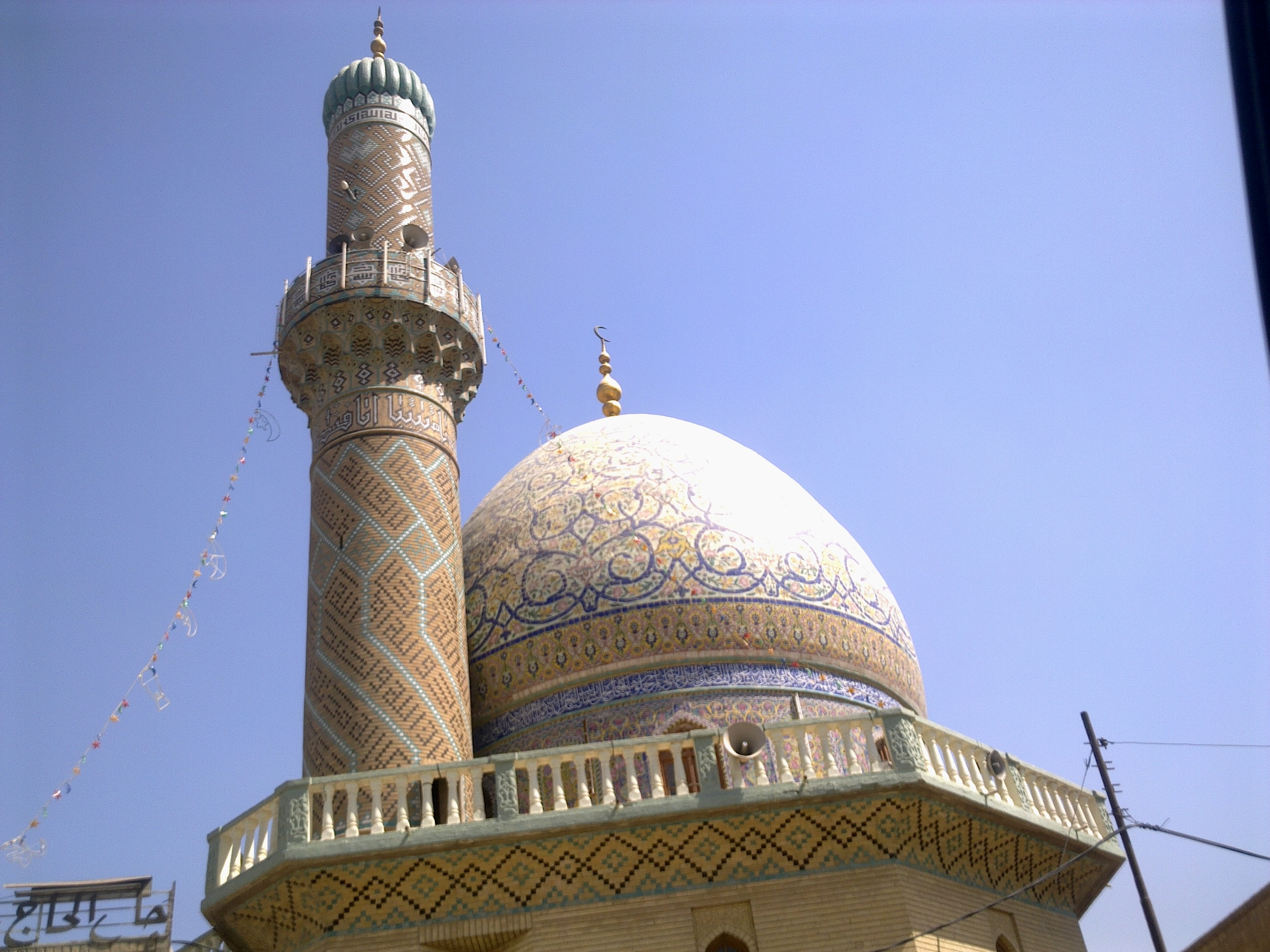
Al-Shawy Mosque

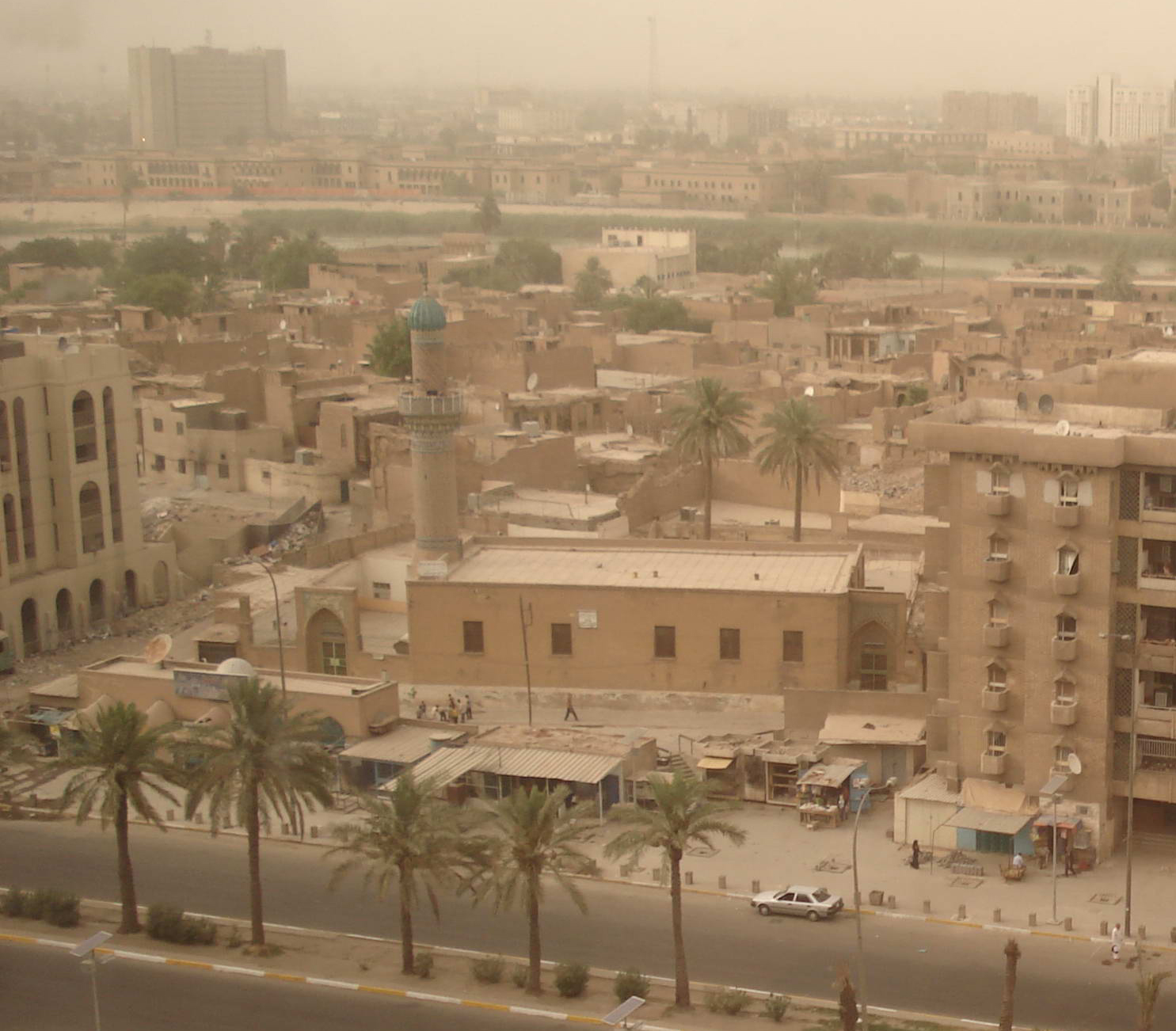
Sheikh Sandal Mosque on Haifa Street

=== Grand Mosque of Baghdad ===
There's a large incomplete mosque near the borders of al-Karkh called the "Grand Mosque of Baghdad", also known as the "Grand Saddam Mosque." The mosque was the innovation of former Iraqi President Saddam Hussein during the Faith Campaign in the 1990s. The mosque was supposed to be one of the largest mosques in the world and would contain 100,000 worshippers. The project cost an estimated 250 million to 500 million dollars. The Iraqi leader first thought of the project in 1994, and reportedly ten design teams were brought to design the mosque along with its dome which was 600 ft in diameter and 210 ft. high. It would also contain a huge lake of water over which the mosque building and its annexes will be built so that the water lake will be included within its architectural mass. Construction began on the grounds of the old al-Muthanna Airport, which was the only civilian airport in the city until the end of the 1960s. However, after the US-led invasion of Iraq, the project and its site have been abandoned and only its arches were ever built and remain.

== People ==
- Abdul Salam Arif
- Abdul Rahman Arif
- Ma'ruf al-Karkhi
- Uday Hussain

== See also ==
- Al-Karkh Sport Club
- List of places in Iraq
- List of neighborhoods and districts in Baghdad
- Ma'ruf al-Karkhi
