= Buratha Mosque =

Twelver Shi'ite mosque in Baghdad, Iraq

- جامع براثا
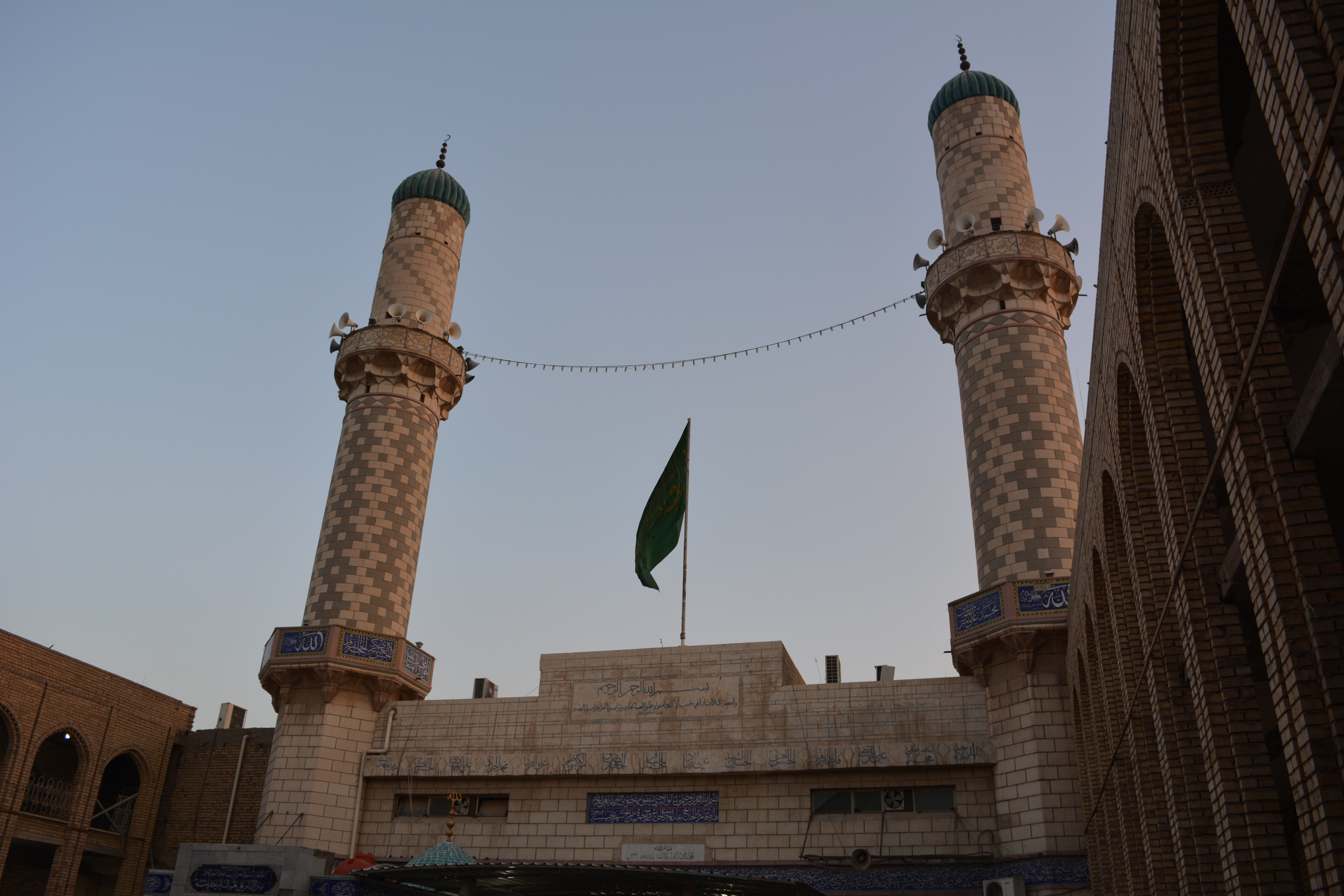
- The mosque in 2015

- Location of the mosque in Baghdad

Religion
- Affiliation: Shia (Twelver)
- Ecclesiastical or organizational status: Mosque
- Status: Active

Location
- Location: Karkh, Baghdad, Baghdad Governorate
- Country: Iraq
- Interactive map of Buratha Mosque
- Coordinates: 33°21′03″N 44°21′40″E

Architecture
- Type: Mosque architecture
- Style: Modern Iraqi
- Completed: 7th century (historic); 1955 (current structure)

Specifications
- Capacity: 1,000–3,000 worshippers
- Dome: One
- Minaret: Two

The Buratha Mosque (Arabic: جامع براثا) is a Twelver Shi'ite mosque, located in the Karkh district of Baghdad, Iraq. It is an important holy site for Twelver Shi'ites. The mosque was allegedly built in the 7th century over an old Nestorian Christian monastery, and it is now located at least 5 kilometres (3.1 mi) from the Al-Kadhimiya Mosque.

== History ==
Local tradition ascribes the construction of the mosque to be in the 7th century. The traditional account states that the mosque was formerly a monastery for the Nestorian Christians, managed by a monk named Hebar. When Hebar met with Ali ibn Abi Talib, he accepted Islam and converted the monastery into an Islamic place of worship. The mosque in that form existed until the 10th century, when the Abbasid Caliph Al-Radi ordered the demolition of the mosque as an attack against the Shi'ite communities. After the mosque was demolished, locals complained of the matter to the governor of Baghdad, whom rebuilt the mosque and inscribed the name of the Caliph Al-Radi there to prevent it from being demolished.

=== Modern history ===
Renovations to the mosque happened in the years 1659 and 1933. In 1955, the mosque was completely rebuilt with local efforts, and two new minarets were introduced to the structure.

==== 2006 bombing ====
In 2006, three suicide bombers, two out of three disguised as women, detonated themselves in the mosque compound, leaving 85 dead and 160 wounded. The attack was also a targeted attack against the Iraqi politician Jalaluddin al-Saghir, who was present in the mosque at the time as its main preacher. However, Saghir was not harmed by the attacks.

== Religious significance ==
The Buratha Mosque is a significant holy place for Twelver Shi'ites due to its association with Ali ibn Abi Talib. It is narrated in Shi'ite holy books that Ali rested here after a fight with the Khawarij. Another miraculous event reported by the Shi'ites is that Ali struck a stone in the floor of the mosque, which revealed a fresh spring.

=== Christian significance ===
Some have believed that the rock in the mosque belongs to the Virgin Mary. It is also believed that Patriarch Abraham and subsequent Patriarchs after him prayed at the site, and one of such Patriarchs is buried in the mosque.

== See also ==
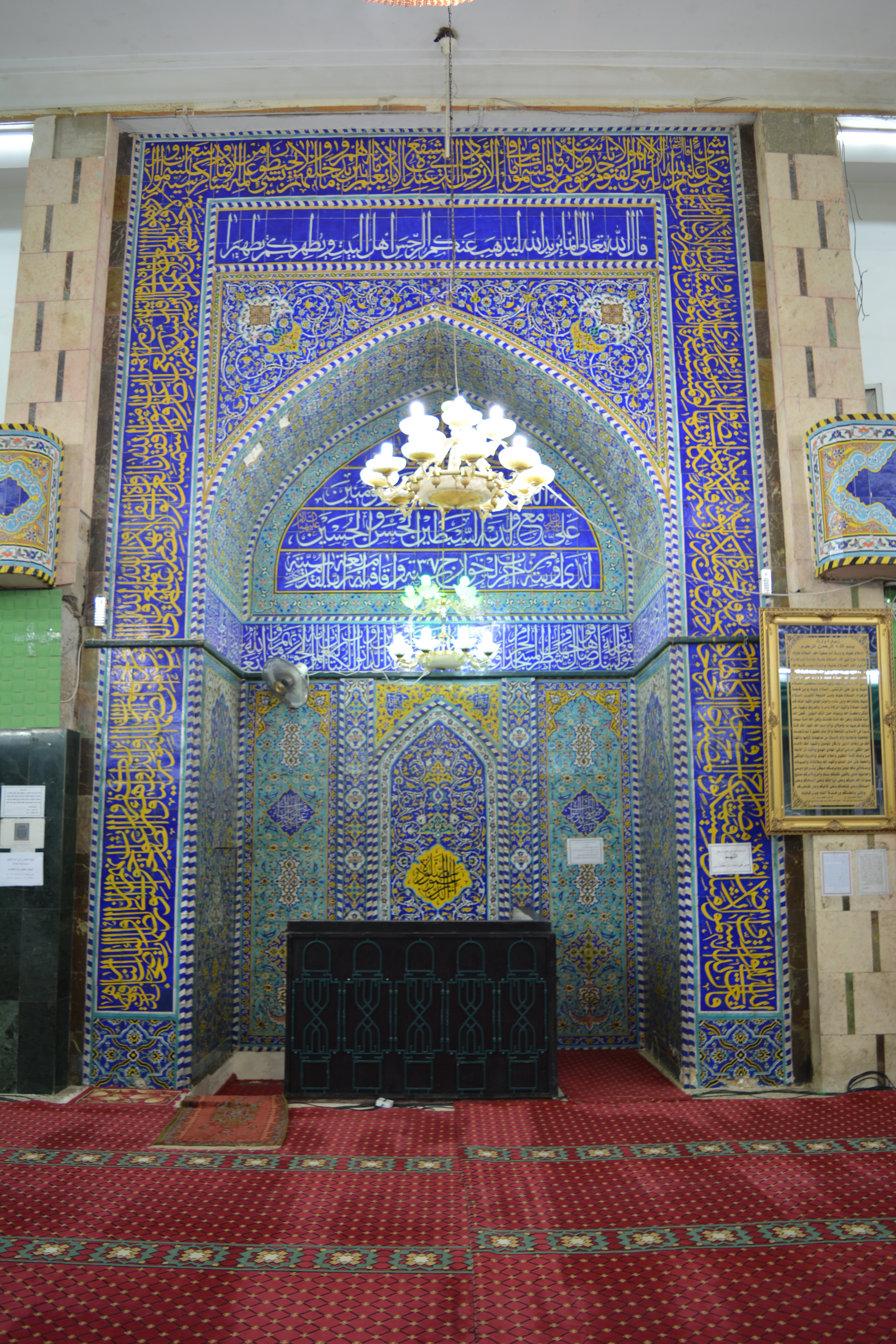
The mihrab of the mosque

- Shia Islam in Iraq
- List of mosques in Baghdad
