= Assassins' Gate =

Assassin's Gate in Baghdad, Iraq

Coordinates: 33.3202°N 44.4007°E

Assassin's Gate
- Interactive map of Assassin's Gate
- Type: Gate/Arch
- Location: Green Zone, Baghdad, Iraq

History
- Built: Early 2000s (during the Iraq War)

Site notes
- Current use: Entry point to the Green Zone, used during military operations
- Governing body: U.S. military (during the Iraq War); currently Iraqi government

The Assassin's Gate is one of four primary points of entry to the Green Zone in Baghdad, Iraq.

The name originates from Assassins Company, a US Army armor unit (Alpha Company - radio call sign "Assassins" - 4th Battalion, 64th Armor Regt., 2nd Brigade, 3D Infantry Division, which combined with combat engineer and infantry companies to form Task Force 464 in the 2003 invasion of Iraq.)

In the taking of Baghdad on April 7, 2003, Assassins Company led the assault on the government center and palace district that later became the Green Zone. On April 8, the unit repelled a significant pre-dawn counterattack through Assassins' Gate, by the Jumhuriyah Bridge. As many as 60 Iraqi soldiers and fedayeen fighters are reported to have been killed in about four hours of fighting. Several of the American tankers up in their hatches were wounded by fire coming down from surrounding buildings before A-10 Warthogs and F/A-18s were called in to destroy the buildings and work over a bunker complex in the adjacent park. Around mid-morning, while searching for a suspected Iraqi forward artillery observer whose radio transmissions were being monitored, one of the tanks fired at the Hotel Palestine from the Jumhuriyah Bridge, killing two European journalists the tank commander said he believed were enemy observers. This prompted accusations by media groups of purposeful targeting of journalists. A Spanish judge brought murder charges against the tank commander, the company commander and the battalion commander. A US military investigation cleared the soldiers of any intentional wrongdoing.

Assassins Company provided security at the gate for several months after the invasion, at one point facing a hostile crowd at the barricade, with the order given to fix bayonets, while at least one soldier was stabbed and wounded by someone in the crowd, according to soldiers who were present.

The name Assassins' Gate does not have any Iraqi origin. It is described as "a sandstone arch." This gate was also the site of a devastating attack from a vehicle-borne improvised explosive that left a 3-foot (0.91 m) deep crater early one morning on January 18, 2004. Many civilians were killed as they entered the gate for their daily jobs inside the Green Zone.
