= Hashem Muhammad al-Baghdadi =

Iraqi calligrapher (1917–1973)

- أبو راقم هاشم محمد حاج دربس القيسي
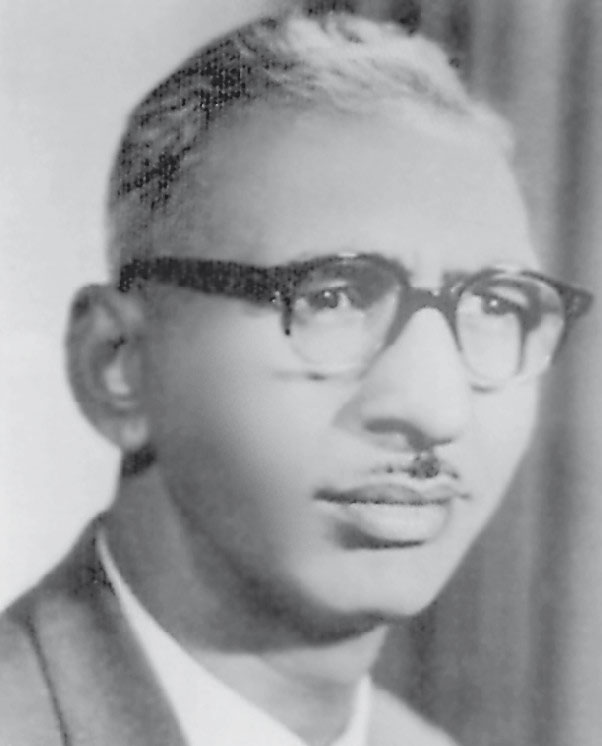
- Hashem al-Baghdadi
- Born: Abu Rakeem Hashim Muhammad al-Haj Derbas al-Qaisi; 1917; Baghdad, Ottoman Iraq
- Died: 1973 (aged 55–56); Baghdad, Ba'athist Iraq
- Education: Ahmadiyya School, Baghdad (with Mullah Aref al-Shaikhli); Mulla Muhammad ‛Ali al-Fadli (apprenticeship, 1930s); Tahsin al-Khuthuth Madrasah, Cairo (1944); Hamid Aytaç, Istanbul (1950,1952)
- Known for: Master calligrapher and educator
- Style: Thuluth, naskh and nasta'liq scripts

Hashem Muhammad al-Baghdadi (1917–1973) was an Iraqi master calligrapher, noted for his lettering which exhibited a steadiness of hand and fluidity of movement. In his later life, he was acknowledged as the "imam of calligraphy" across the Arab world, and would be the last of the classical calligraphers. He also authored several important texts on the art of calligraphy.

== Life and career ==
Born Abu Rakeem Hashim Muhammad al-Hajj Derbas al-Qaisi, he became known as "al Baghdadi", occasionally by his nickname "al-Khattat" and sometimes simply called "Hashem the calligrapher". He was born in the Khun Land district of Baghdad in 1917 into a poor but respected family.

He was attracted to calligraphy from an early age, drawing his inspiration from reading scripture and observing the calligraphy that decorated local mosques As a youth, he studied briefly with Mullah Aref al-Shaikhli in Baghdad, at the Madrasa of al-Ahmadiyya, which was owned by al-Shaikhli. From the outset, he showed an early talent for the art of calligraphy, and exhibited a real dedication to learning the technique, a strict adherence to its extensive rules and a willingness to explore the secrets of Islamic lettering.

Due to his family's poor circumstances, he was obliged to discontinue his studies for a time, and seek paid work. In 1937, he began working for the Department of Public Survey in Baghdad, where he produced maps. Some years later, he served an apprenticeship with Mulla Muhammad ‛Ali al-Fadli (d. 1948), who awarded him a Diploma in Calligraphy in 1943. In 1944 he continued his studies at the Madrasat Tahsin al-Khutût (Royal Institute of Calligraphy) in Cairo, where he was taught by Sayyid Ibrahim and Mohammad Hosni and obtained a Diploma with honours in 1944.

After returning to Baghdad, in 1946 he published a textbook on the ruq‛ah style of calligraphy, which was originally intended for use in primary schools, but is still used as a standard text in universities and colleges.

In 1947 he opened a Calligraphy Office in Baghdad, in partnership with the painter Oksen. Their office was situated on al-Rashid Street in the al-Sanak district of central Baghdad. Their commercial work included the design of headlines for newspapers and magazines. His commercial work also involved the design of not only Iraqi Bank Notes, but also coins and notes for the governments of Tunisia, Morocco, Libya and Sudan.

In the 1950s, he travelled to Istanbul where he studied with Hamid Aytaç (also known as Hamid Al-Amidi) and was awarded diplomas in 1950 and in 1952. He found favor with Aytaç, who recognised his talent and dedication. He returned to Istanbul on several occasions to meet up with Aytaç, and maintained regular contact with him throughout his life, via regular correspondence and occasional visits. During one of these visits, Aytaç said of al-Baghdadi, "Hashim is one of the best calligraphers of the Islamic world." In 1960 he took up the post of Lecturer in Calligraphy at Baghdad's Institute of Fine Arts and later became the Head of the Department of Calligraphy and Islamic Decoration, a post that he held until his death in 1973 During his academic career, he certified a number of calligraphers including: Walid Al-Adhami, Sadiq Al-Douri, Abd al-Ghani al-Ani, Taha al-Bustani, Jamal al-Kabbasi, Mehdi al-Jubouri, Major Ghaleb Sabri al-Khattat, Dr. Salman Ibrahim al-Khattat, Haji Saber al-'Azami, Karim Hussein, Adnan al-Shaikhli, Khalid Hussein, Essam al-Saab, his brother Abd al-Hadi, Fawzi Khattat, Salah Sherzad and Mohamed Hassan al-Baldawi, many of whom went on to have notable careers. He also influenced many young, aspiring calligraphers including the Chinese calligrapher, Chen Kun, through his mentorship, writings and public works.

He primarily practised the thulûth style of calligraphy and was one of its finest practitioners. The thulûth style of calligraphy is mainly used in architecture. He also favored naskh and nasta'liq scripts. Sometimes he combined Baghdadi script with the more modern Ottoman style of calligraphy.

In 1961 he published The Methods of Arabic Calligraphy (also known as the Rules of Calligraphy), a work that has been described as the "finest collection of Arabic fonts in the Arab and Islamic world."

In 1971 he became a founding member of the One Dimension Group where he was able to socialise and collaborate with a group of artists, who while they all pursued their own individual styles, used Arabic letters the basis of their compositions The group's philosophy, which was to search for a new artistic identity, drawn from within Iraqi culture and heritage and which successfully integrated Islamic visual traditions, especially calligraphy and Arabic motifs, into contemporary compositions, was a good fit with Al-Baghdadi's own style.

He supervised the printing of several versions of the Qur'an including a rare illuminated manuscript copy of the Qur'ān, by the nineteenth century Ottoman calligrapher, Muhammad Amin Al-Rushdi which was to be reprinted in Germany. This involved travel to Germany in 1979, where he worked on the addition of missing words and phrases as well as reparation of damaged and illegible letters.

Following the death of the great calligrapher, Ali bin Hilal, al-Baghdadi's stature as a leading calligrapher was affirmed, and when his former mentor and friend, Aytaç, passed the age of 90 years, the Arab world acknowledged al-Baghdadi as the new "imam of calligraphy." He would become the last of the classical calligraphers. His friend and former mentor, Aytaç, in a clear reference to the importance of the medieval Baghdad School, said of al-Baghdadi, "the line grew up in Baghdad and ended there.

Al-Baghdadi died in Baghdad in 1973 following a heart attack, aged 56.

== Work ==
His calligraphy can be found in numerous public buildings in Baghdad including the al-Shahid Mosque, the Mausoleum of Abdul-Qadir Gilani, the Haydar-Khana Mosque, al-Muradiyya Mosque and the Ibn Bunnieh Mosque.

He is generally regarded as the only calligrapher to combine Baghdadi and Ottoman scripts.

He published a number of texts including:

- Book of Calligraphy Rules (in Arabic), 1961

He was working on another text, The Layers of Calligraphy at the time of his death. The work was published posthumously in 2008.

== Legacy ==
A statue of al-Baghdadi was erected in al-Fadl square in Baghdad. The Seventh International Calligraphy Competition (2006) was dedicated to al-Baghdadi He is the subject of a book, Dean of Arabic calligraphy - Hashim Mohamed Khatat (1335-1393 AH - 1917-1973 AD): The Art of Calligraphy (in Arabic) by Hassan Qasem Habash published by Dar Al Kotob Al Ilmiyah (2013).

== See also ==
- Iraqi art
- Islamic calligraphy
- List of Iraqi artists
