= Amani Alaa =

Iraqi actress and comedy artist (born 1994)

- أماني علاء
- Born: June 18, 1994 (age 32); Najaf, Iraq
- Education: Al-Mustansiriya University
- Occupation: Actor

Amani Alaa (Arabic: أماني علاء; June 18, 1994 in Najaf) is an Iraqi actress and comedy artist.

== Works ==
=== Series ===
- (Karekater)
- (Fitamen)
- (Habazboz)
- (Dolab Almadina)
- (Zaraq Waraq)

=== Plays ===
- (Play Fakhfh fi amreka)

=== Sound performance ===
- Alatak
- Shalash
