= Al-Wazeer Mosque =

Sunni mosque in Baghdad, Iraq

- جامع الوزير
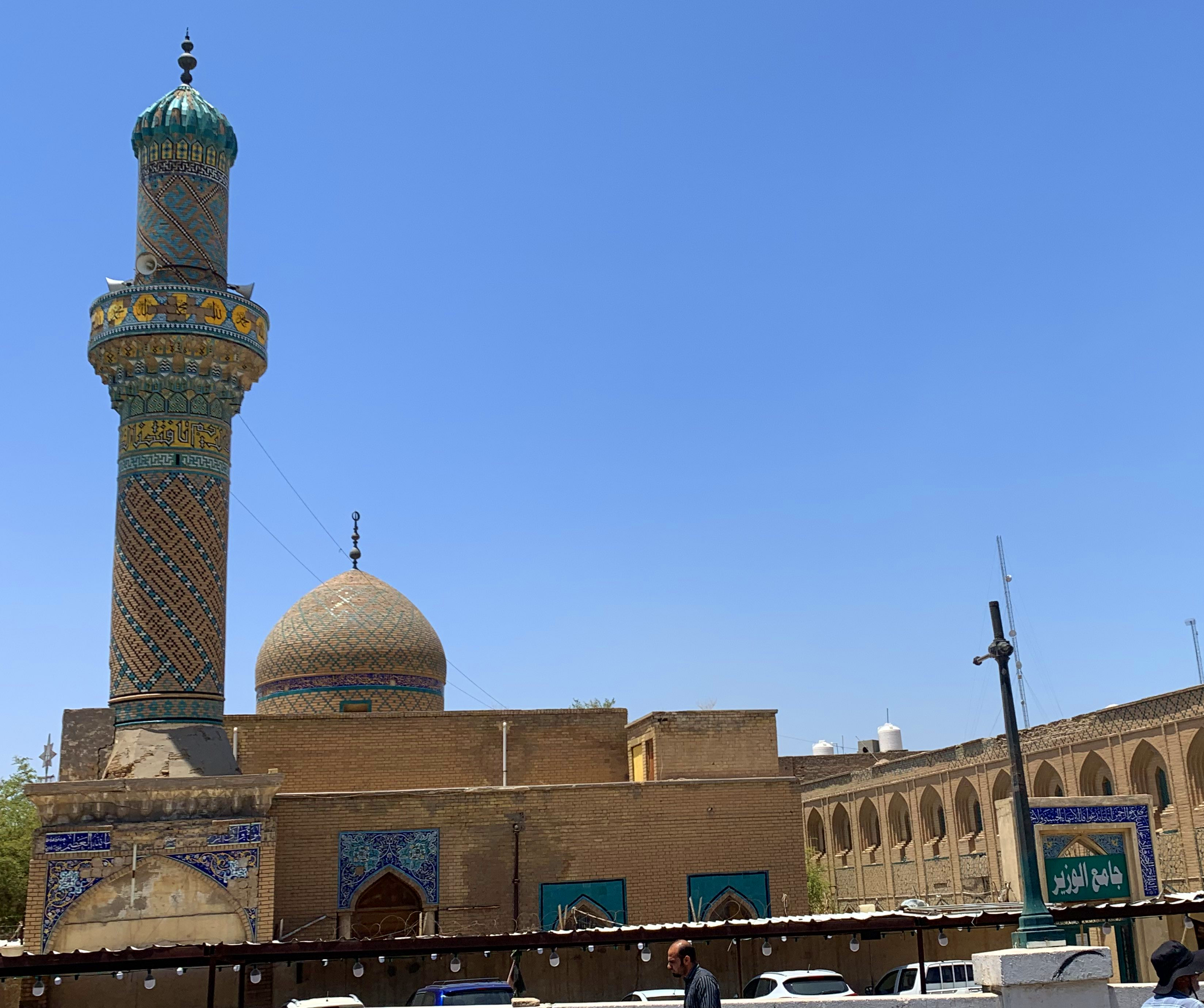
- The mosque in 2023

- Location of the mosque in Baghdad, Iraq

Religion
- Affiliation: Sunni Islam
- Ecclesiastical or organizational status: Mosque
- Status: Active

Location
- Location: Al-Rusafa, Baghdad, Baghdad Governorate
- Country: Iraq
- Interactive map of Al-Wazeer Mosque
- Coordinates: 33°20′21″N 44°23′19″E

Architecture
- Type: Mosque architecture
- Style: Ottoman
- Completed: c. 1599 CE; 1686 (dome added)

Specifications
- Capacity: 400 worshipers
- Dome: One
- Minaret: One
- Materials: Tiles; marble; bricks; timber

The Al-Wazeer Mosque (Arabic: جامع الوزير, romanized: Jami' al-Wazir) is a Sunni mosque, located in the Al-Rusafa district of Baghdad, in the Baghdad Governorate of Iraq. The mosque was built by the Wazir of Baghdad Hassan Pasha in 1599 CE during the Ottoman era. The mosque was renovated and restored in the intervening years. The main characteristic of the mosque is its Ottoman style. The mosque is situated behind the Souk al-Sarai, near the riverbank of the Tigris.

The a mosque is located, adjacent to the al-Asifyah Mosque, in an area that is part of a tentative UNESCO World Heritage Site.

== History ==
The site of the mosque, located next to Souk al-Sarai and overlooking the Tigris River, used to belong to a previous mosque named "Dhu al-Manara Mosque", that dated from the Abbasid era. Imad Abd al-Salam Rauf, an Iraqi historian, suggested that the location of a madrasa, built in 1106 CE during the reign of Seljuk Emir Muhammad I Tapar, was named "Tatchi-Baghdadi Madrasa".

Construction on the mosque began in 1599 under the supervision of Hassan Pasha who governed Baghdad under the Ottoman Empire between 1594 and 1603. The mosque became known as "al-Wazeer Mosque" meaning "The Governor's Mosque". The Pasha renewed the architecture of the mosque and established a scientific madrasa that taught rational and communicative sciences. Among the most well-known teachers who taught at the mosque was the Sheikh Taha al-Sanwi who was also buried in the mosque.

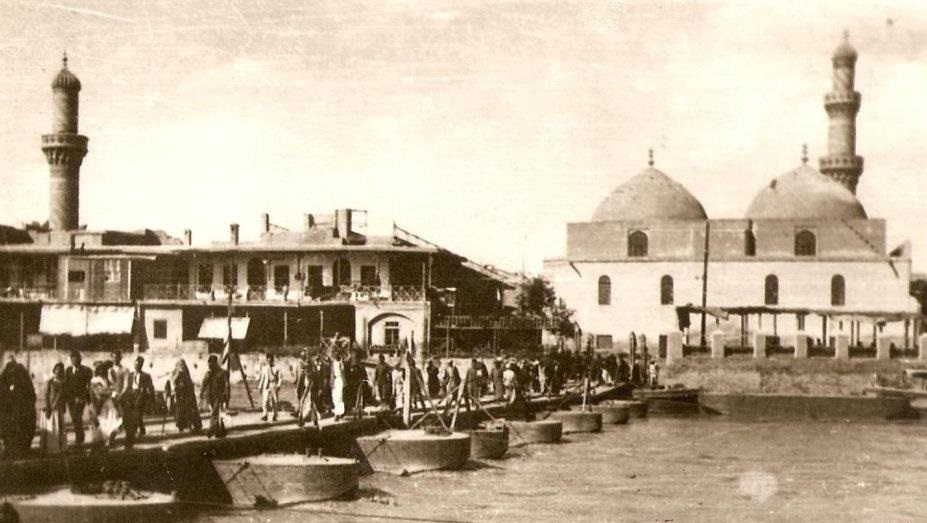
The mosque's minaret as seen on the left next to al-Asifyah Mosque, 1930

In 1604, a famous coffeehouse was built next to the mosque that overlooked the Tigris River and was named the "Hassan Pasha Café." In 1686, an army officer named "Ahmed Agha" was ordered to rebuild the western side of the mosque. He also added a high dome and expanded it. According to Sherif Youssef, an Iraqi historian, the mosque was renewed multiple times throughout its history that its minaret remains the oldest preserved part of the mosque in its original form.

In 1916, James Silk Buckingham, a British traveler and journalist, visited the mosque and, during his visit, he noted the mosque for its "fine dome and lofty minaret" in his 1827 journal, Travels in Mesopotamia.

== Architecture ==
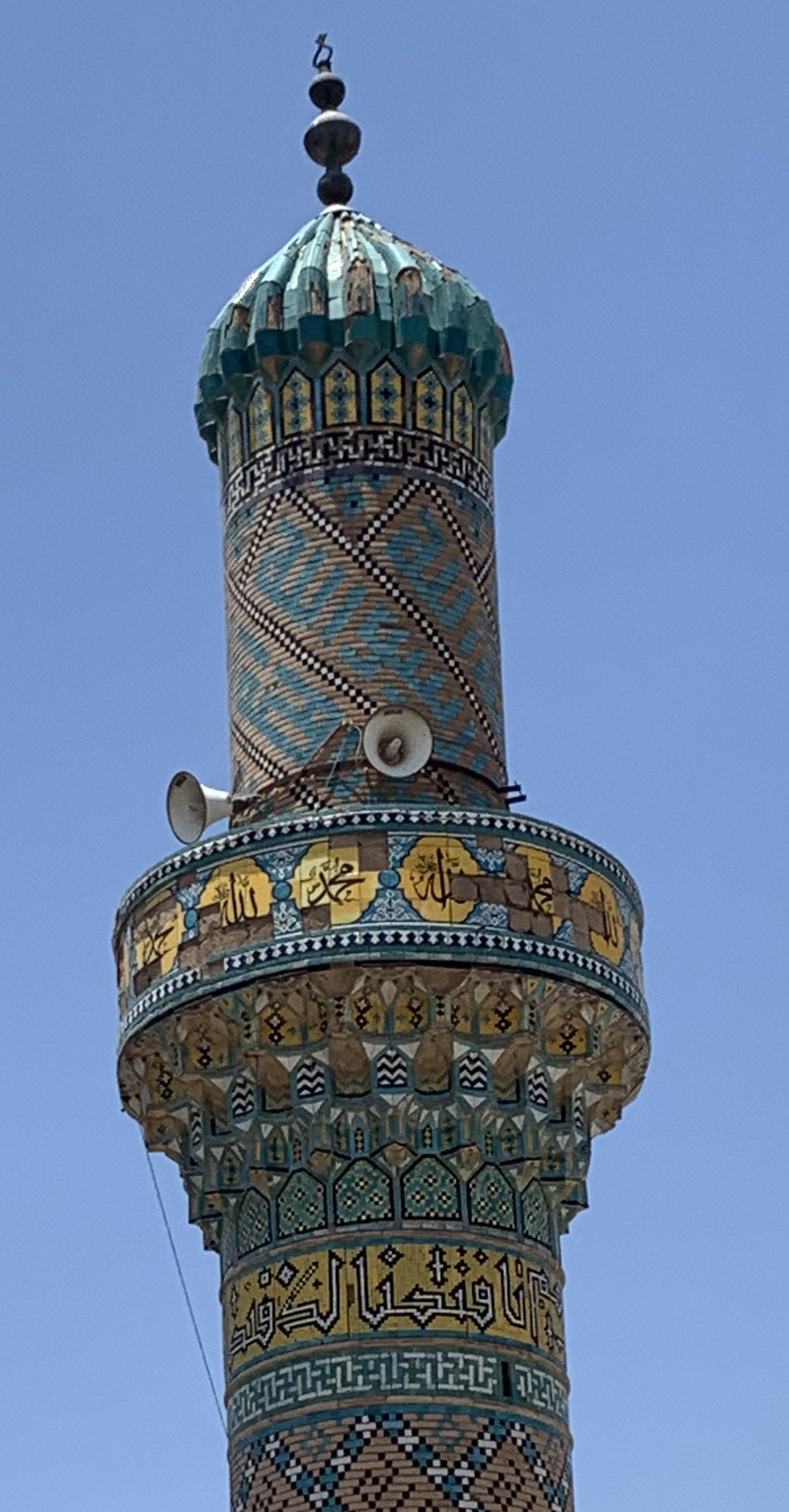
The minaret.

The Al-Wazeer Mosque is located in the heart of the Souk al-Sarai, near al-Mutanabbi Street. The mosque contains a traditional Iraqi minaret in addition to a dome covered with glazed tiles and marble. Inside, there are decorations consisting of stalactites and muqarnas decorated with Qur'anic verses and floral motifs. The entrance to the mosque is a wooden door surrounded by yellow bricks and glazed with blue. Once entering the mosque, a wide courtyard reaches more than 1,000 square metres (11,000 sq ft), with walls decorated with motifs and writings. The mosque contains prayer space for over more than 400 worshippers. On the left side of the mosque, there is a round-shaped minaret. The attached garden extends to the riverbank of the Tigris river.

The mosque has two places for the summer prayer, which can accommodate about 330 worshippers, and also the winter prayer room, which can accommodate 500 worshippers. The mosque is considered one of the most beautiful mosques in Baghdad and it generated a folktale about its construction following a shipwreck on the bank of the Tigris River that set its location.

== Gallery ==
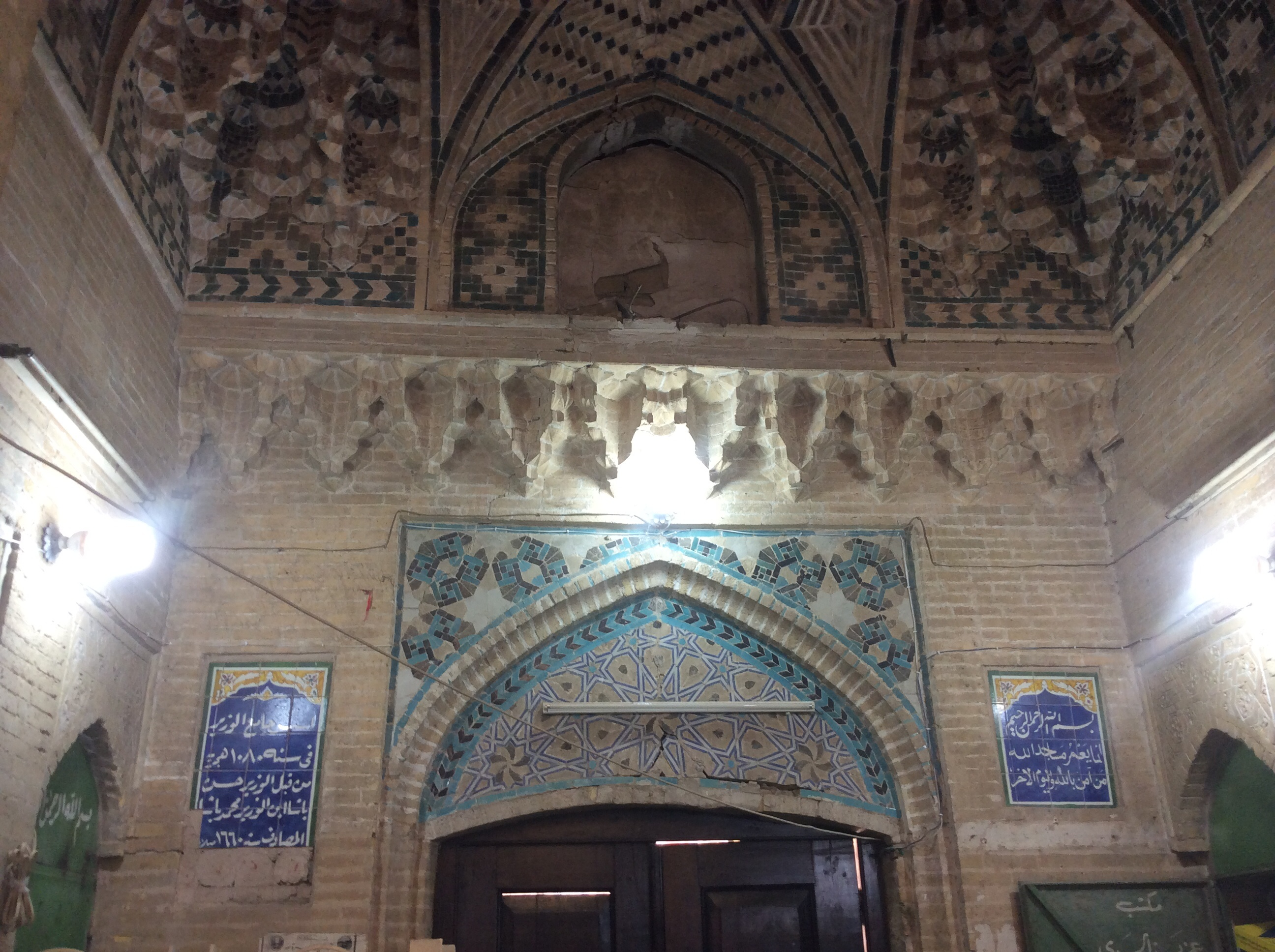
The interior design features muqarnas

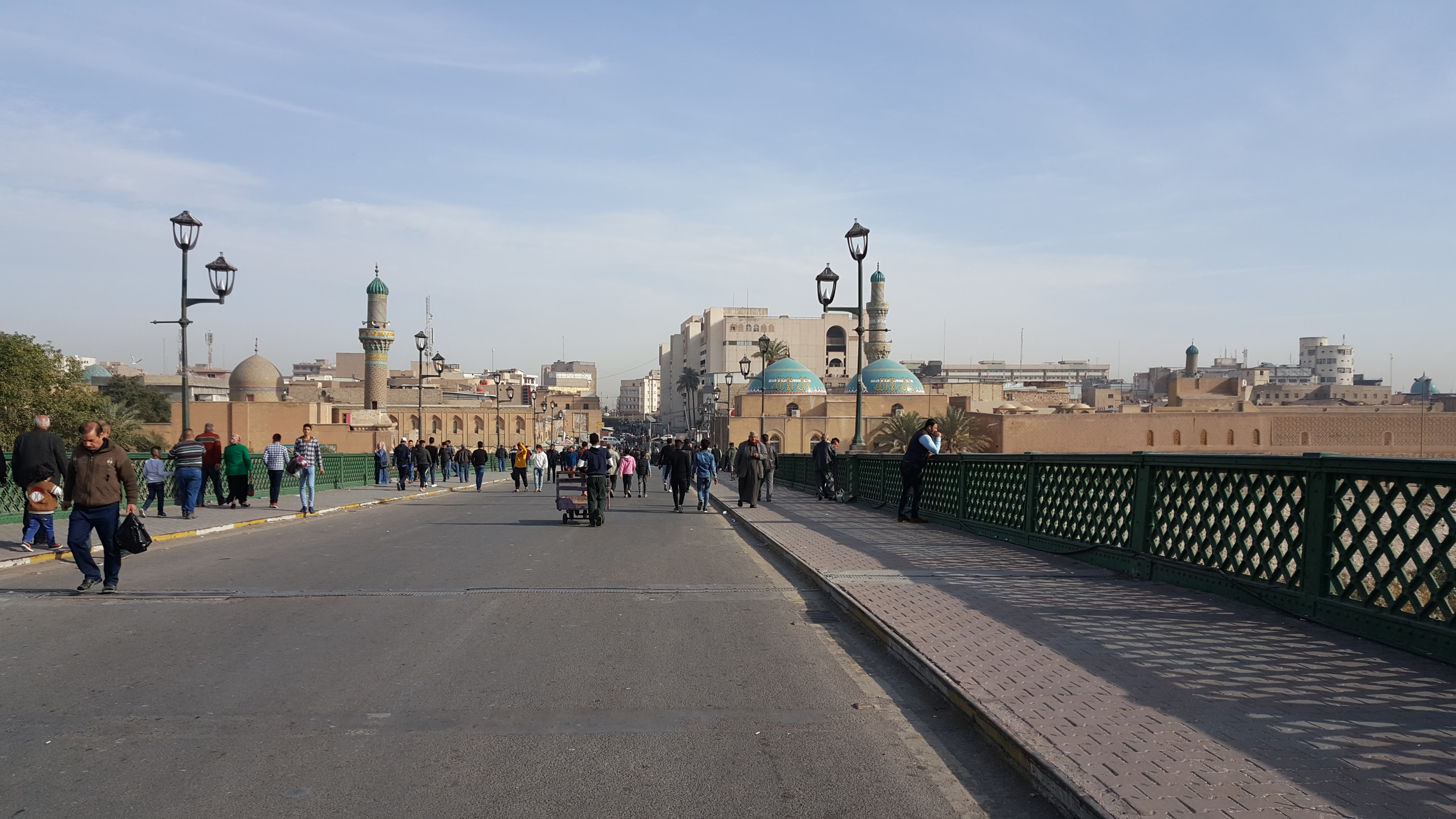
The mosque next to al-Asifyah Mosque, 2017

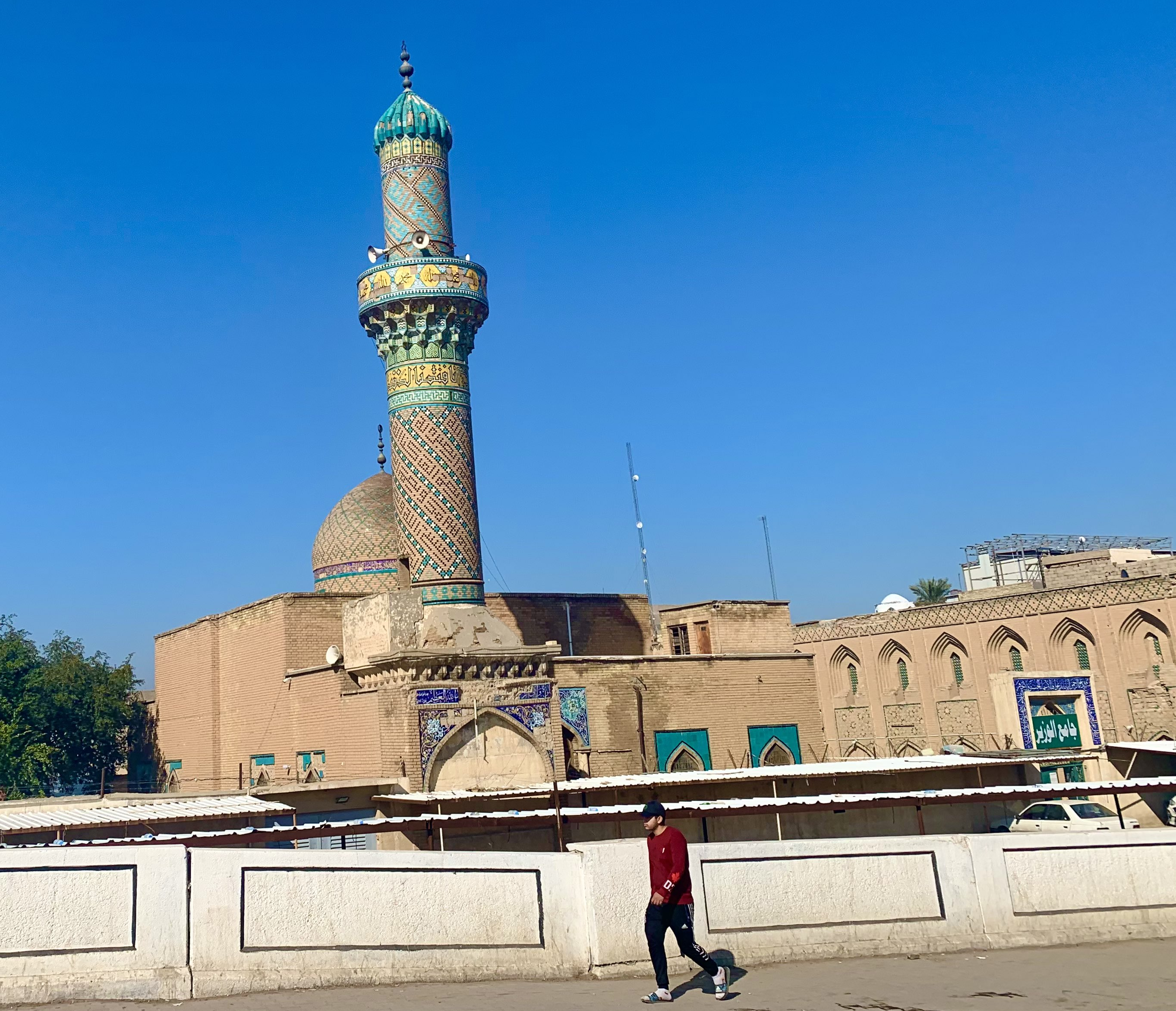
The mosque in 2023

== See also ==
- Islam in Iraq
- List of mosques in Baghdad
