= Abbasid Palace =

Ancient Abbasid complex in Baghdad, Iraq

- القصر العباسي
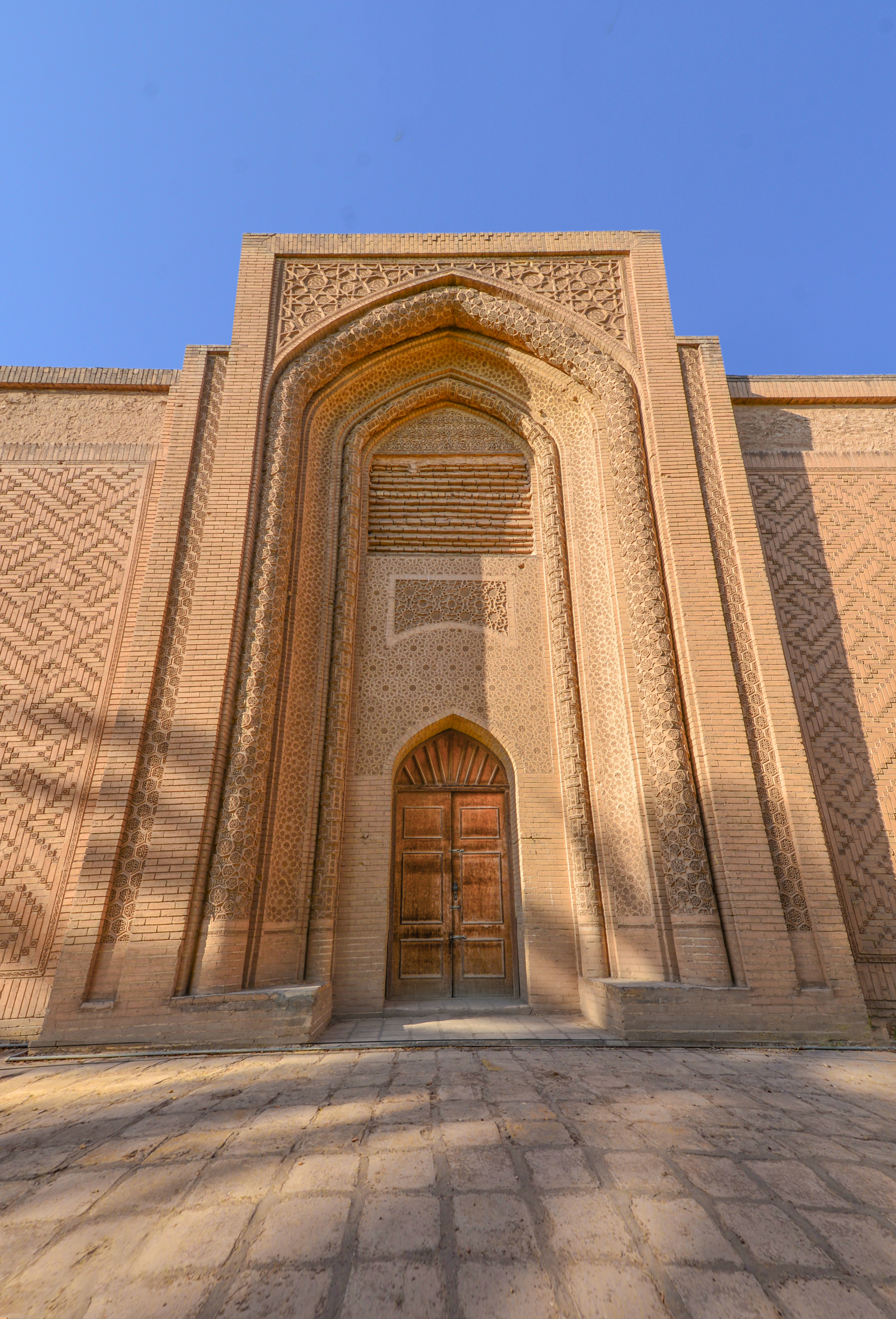
- Entrance gate of the Abbasid Palace

General information
- Type: Historic architectural complex
- Architectural style: Abbasid
- Location: Baghdad, Iraq
- Coordinates: 33°20′35″N 44°23′01″E
- Year built: Late 12th or early 13th century

Technical details
- Material: Brick and wood

The Abbasid Palace (Arabic: القصر العباسي, romanized: al-Qaṣr al-ʿAbbāsī) is the conventional name of a late Abbasid-era brick complex in Baghdad, Iraq. Its original identity and function remain disputed. It has been identified as either a palace of the Abbasid caliph al-Nasir or a madrasa commonly identified as the Sharabiyya Madrasa. The building stands near the eastern bank of the Tigris in the al-Rusafa district and is generally dated to the late 12th or early 13th century. North of al-Mutanabbi Street and a part of al-Maidan area. The palace dates back to the late 12th or early 13th century. It was most likely built by the Abbasid caliph al-Nasir (although this is disputed). Fortified walls with elevated walkways and vantage points surround the complex. The Abbasid Palace is one of the few remaining examples of Abbasid-era buildings in Baghdad along with the Mustansiriyya Madrasa and others. After falling into ruin, it was heavily reconstructed during the 20th century.

The Abbasid Palace is considered one of the most important archaeological buildings in Baghdad due to its age and Islamic architecture. The area in which the palace is located in, as well as the palace itself, are a part of a tentative UNESCO World Heritage Site.

== Background ==
The palace was said to be built under the reign of Abbasid Caliph al-Nasir and includes special examples of Islamic architecture and façade of that time. During the early 20th-century, the German archeologist Ernst Herzfeld would examine the complex for the first time. At the time, he referred to it as "Iwan al-Qal'ah" since the only remains of the complex are the large gate and the courtyard with vague inscriptions. Several excavation and restoration missions would then materialize over the complex between 1933 and 1970. But the palace was left mostly untouched until 1980 under the leadership of former president Saddam Hussein when the palace was restored to its current form and also served as the headquarters for the former Iraqi House of Culture and Arts.

=== Debate on the building's origins ===
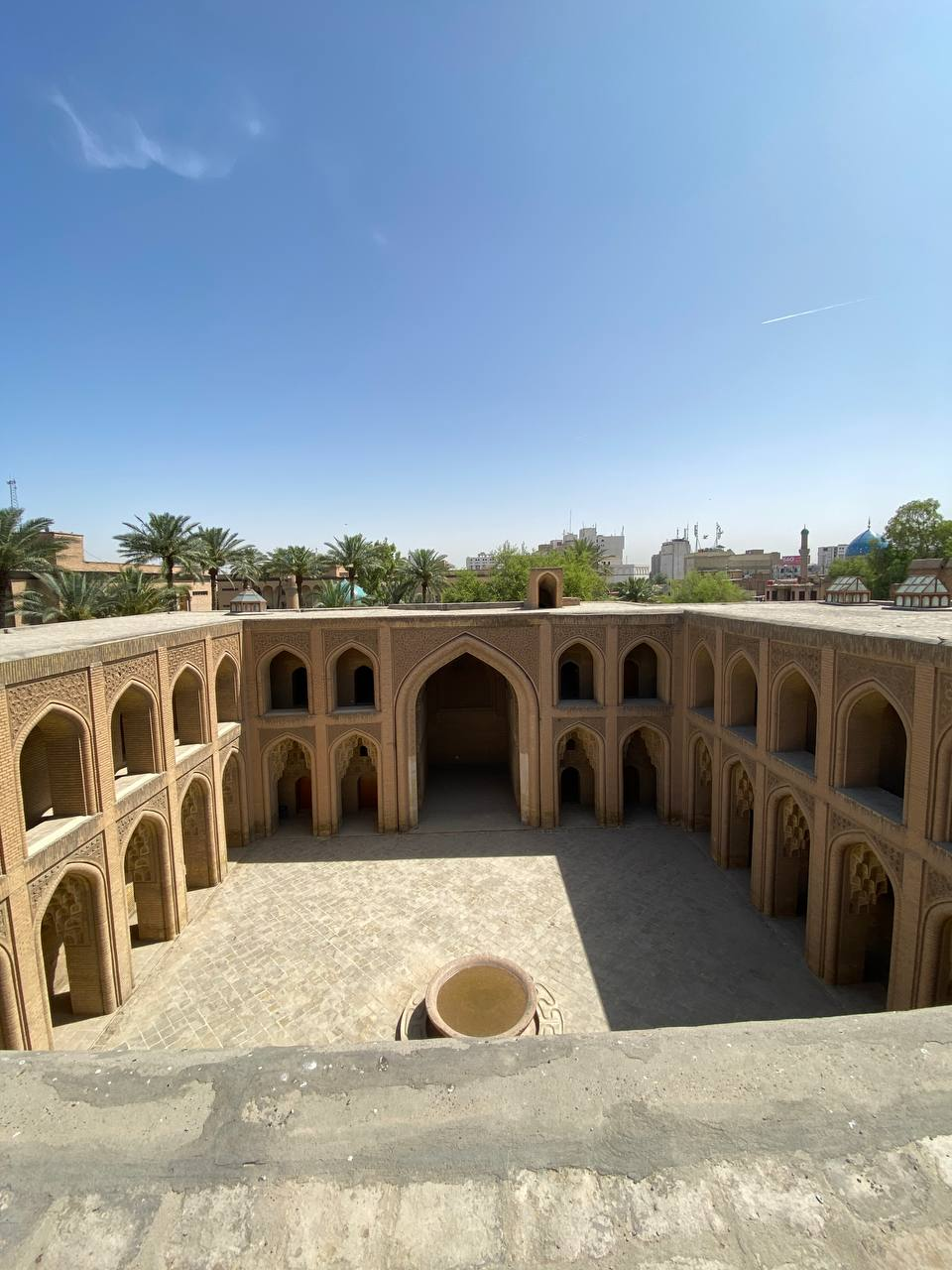
The courtyard of the Abbasid Palace

During the many episodes of archeology, restoration, and excavations, many discoveries were made such as the northern side of the courtyard is occupied by a structure that is topped by six domes suggesting Ottoman-like features. But no epigraphic evidence was found to suggest this was a caliph's palace or to back up its origins in general.

Due to this, researchers and historians studying the complex gave it many names according to their opinions and research. It was first called Iwan al-Qal'ah or the Palace of the Castle. They also debated on which of the Abbasid palaces this one was if it was one. Some historians, including Iraqi historians Mustafa Jawad and Ya'qub Sarkis, supported the idea that it was the palace of caliph al-Nasir, relying on historical and schematic evidence, including what Andalusian traveler Ibn Jubayr mentioned on his trip to Baghdad where he reported seeing Caliph al-Nasir as he descended with his boat to his palace at the top of the eastern side on the Tigris River's shore. This matches with the location of the palace as it is at the top of the eastern side along with the old wall of Baghdad that still has its foundations remaining in the wall of the palace. Al-Nasir demolished the walls and built this palace in its place between 1180 and 1184. The architecture of the complex is also an important factor as it mirrors the architecture of another Abbasid structure, the Mustansiriyya Madrasa. Factors such as the gate, the iwans, and the structure suggest it dates back to the Abbasid Caliphate. Traditionally, its considered a place where the caliph would meet dignitaries and visitors.

Although it was also argued that the palace may belong to Caliph al-Mustansir or that the building was a madrasa called the "Sharabiyya Madrasa" instead of an Abbasid caliph's palace. Many scholars have rejected the idea that this complex was intended to be a palace. Suggesting that it was the Sharabiyya Madrasa, or at the very least a madrasa, instead due to its architectural similarities to the Mustansiriyya Madrasa. Mainly, the architecture and the two levels contain side rooms that are large enough to be classrooms and house students. Despite arguments that the complex was allegedly a madrasa, there is also evidence that challenges this perspective. The historical sources suggest that the complex's location was home to the old Baghdad citadel and historically has been an administration center. Furthermore, historical sources have been silent on the alleged madrasa and that medieval complexes often share typological features. Therefore, it has been agreed that the complex may have been at least an Abbasid palace. (Note: Despite the disagreements, the complex became publicly known as the "Abbasid Palace.")

=== Recent history ===
By the early 20th century the building was partly ruined. Significant parts of it were reconstructed between (approximately) 1933 and 1971 by the Iraqi Directorate of Antiquities. Excavations were also carried out during this period to uncover missing parts of the building. The exterior main entrance on the southwestern side of the building is a product of this reconstruction, while the vestibule to which it leads has been well preserved. In the courtyard, the main iwan was restored while some of the arcaded façades around it and two other sides of the courtyard were rebuilt.

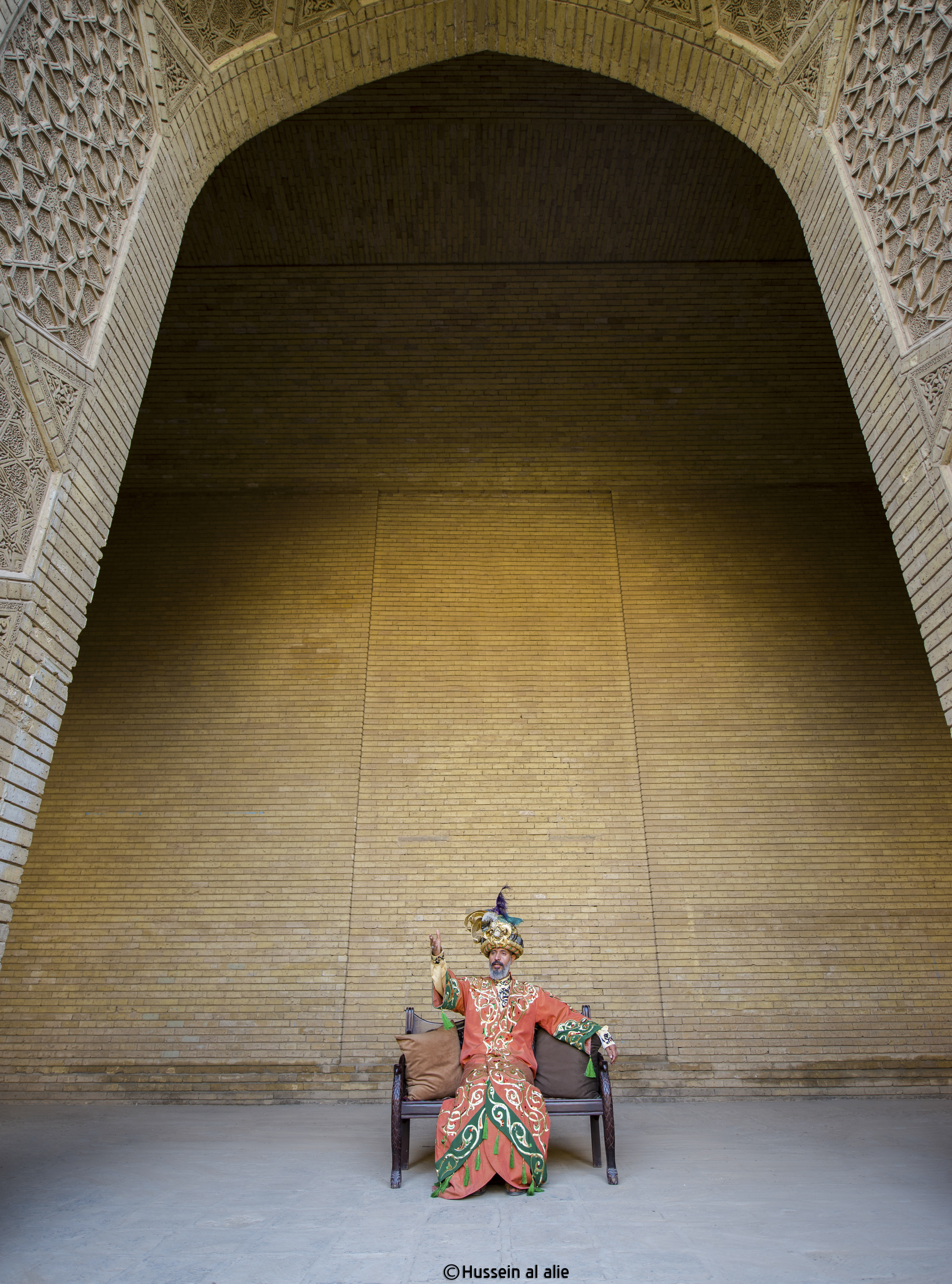
A cosplayer in Abbasid Caliph clothes inside the Abbasid Palace.

In May 2018, a ceremony was held inside the Abbasid Palace that included poetry readings accompanied by playing the oud, followed by the playing of Sufi compositions by a band, maqam songs from the Iraqi heritage, a plastic art exhibition and a folklore bazaar that included accessories, handmade carpets and handicrafts. The event saw a crowded and diverse audience and also the supervision of the Director General of the Department of Public Cultural Relations, Falah Hassan Shaker. This event also gave two main messages. The first is sending a message to the world that Iraqis are proud of their heritage and civilization, with everyone participating in reviving the occasion, and the other message was aimed towards the Iraqi government with the need to pay attention to Iraqi archaeological sites and heritage buildings. The supervisor of the Baghdad file, the City of Literary Creativity, Dr. Sadiq Rahma, praised the event, saying, “The Abbasid Palace is a new creative space in which we can hold future activities, and the activity of the Department of Cultural Relations today is one of the best cultural activities, especially after its rehabilitation, which was completely neglected.”

In May 2024, a wedding took place in the Abbasid Palace. The wedding included 50 guests and a band that played traditional Iraqi music. Areej Fadhil chose this location for her wedding due to her love for the complex and was inspired by other couples around the world who had their weddings at heritage locations. Despite this, the decision to open the palace to such events by authorities ignited debates across Iraq about the misuse of heritage sites and the history of such sites, including recent neglect and looting of heritage landmarks.

== Architecture ==
=== Gate ===
The gate of the complex is located on the western side of the building which faces the Tigris River and leads to the rectangular courtyard. The gate to the palace consists of an altar with a roof decorated with carvings and benches designated for guards and servants. It is the entrance to the palace and the altar to the side of the grand palace. It is more than 21 meters long and is surrounded by two niches in the form of a large, full circle, and is engraved with Qur’anic verses. It is recognized as one of the largest heritage Abbasid arches in Baghdad in the ornate Islamic architectural style.

=== Layout and features ===
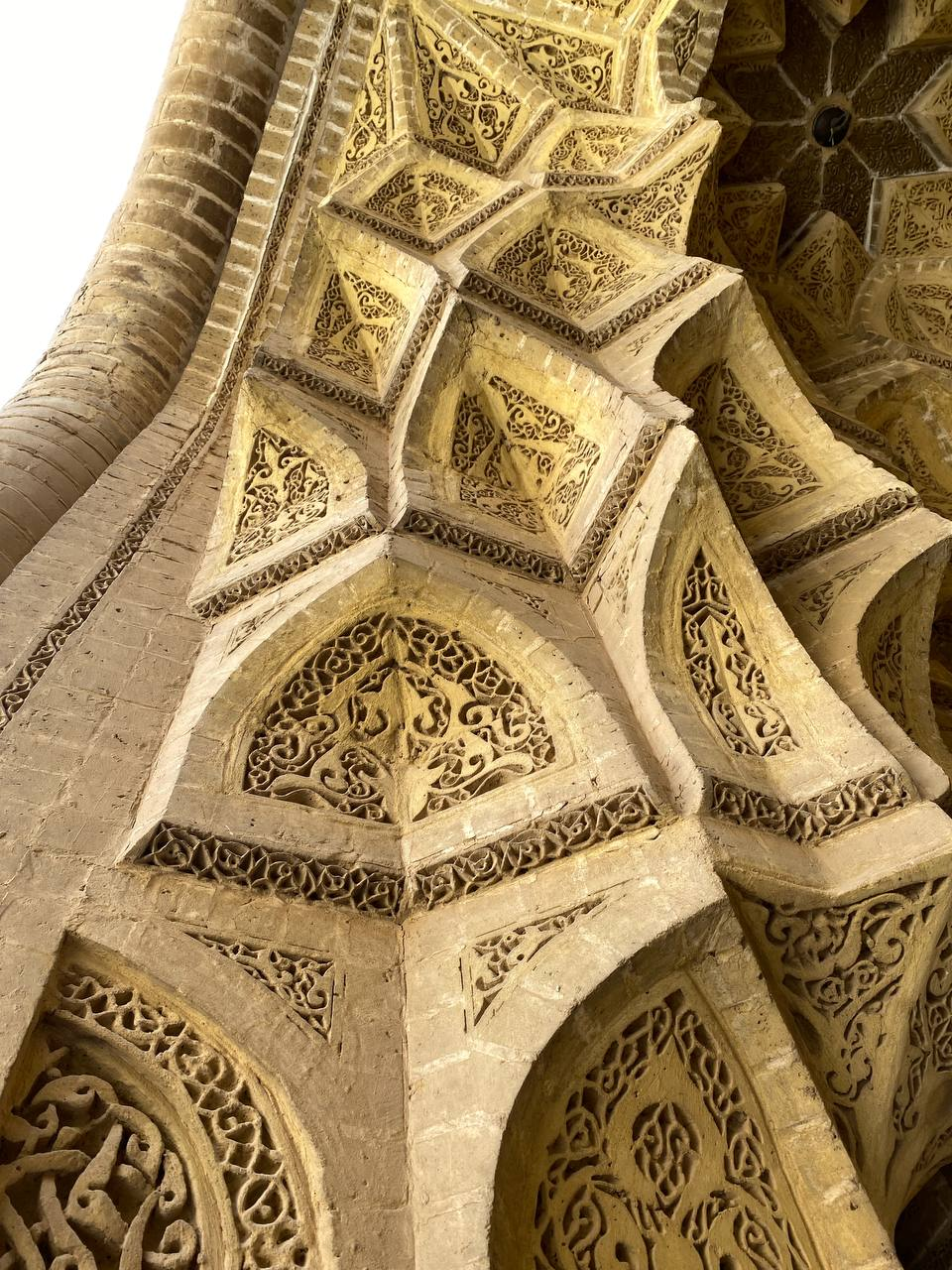
Decorations of the muqarnas in one of the iwans of the palace that extends to the vault and ends in an eight-pointed star at the top.

The palace is notable for its special architectural carving style in Islamic architecture which is similar to that of al-Mustansiriya Madrasa. Inside the complex is a rectangular courtyard with a large fountain in the middle, the courtyard is distinguished by brick decorations of different sizes and shapes. Surrounded by the courtyard are corridors and vestibules each of which is more than 26 meters long and more than nine meters high. The corridors contain muqarnas and open up to the courtyard through pointed arches.

The bricked arches and iwans of the palace include vaulted recesses and are filled with carved geometric decorations. Specifically the eastern corridor contains a vault that consists of a series of interlocked muqarnas that appear like a corbelled cell. The muqarnas appear through the iwans and end each in an eight-pointed star. Although vaulted muqarnas have already become a widespread feature of Islamic architecture by the 13th century, the muqarnas in the palace feature unique inscriptions and ornaments.

Entering the palace, one can feel cold air surrounding them, this is because the building was designed to be cool in the summer and warm in the winter. The bricks of the building that were used for walls and ceilings were exposed to high temperatures so that they can be more durable and solid. Decorative bricks were exposed to medium and light temperatures so that the sculptor and engineer could make decorations and sculptures out of them. The walls of the building are thick which made the palace fortified and durable. The ground floor includes 18 rooms while the second floor contains 22. Among the rooms is an iwan, madrasa rooms, and a prayer mosque. Parts of the complex are also decorated with arabesque motifs which originated in Baghdad.

General details of the Abbasid Palace

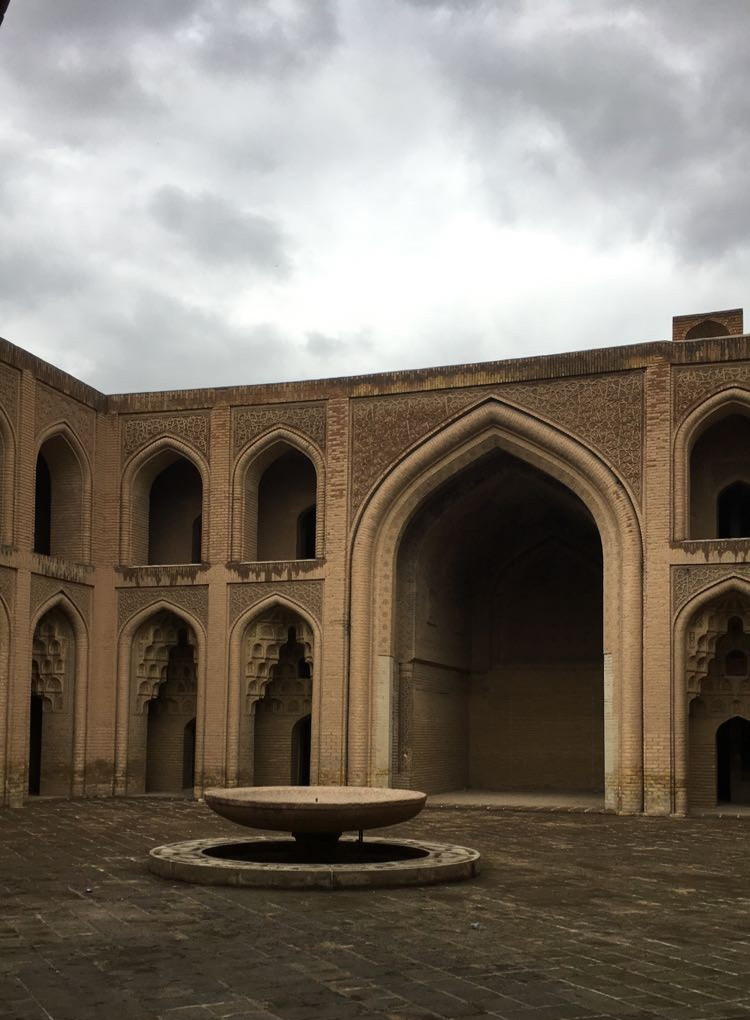
The Abbasid's Palace's courtyard.

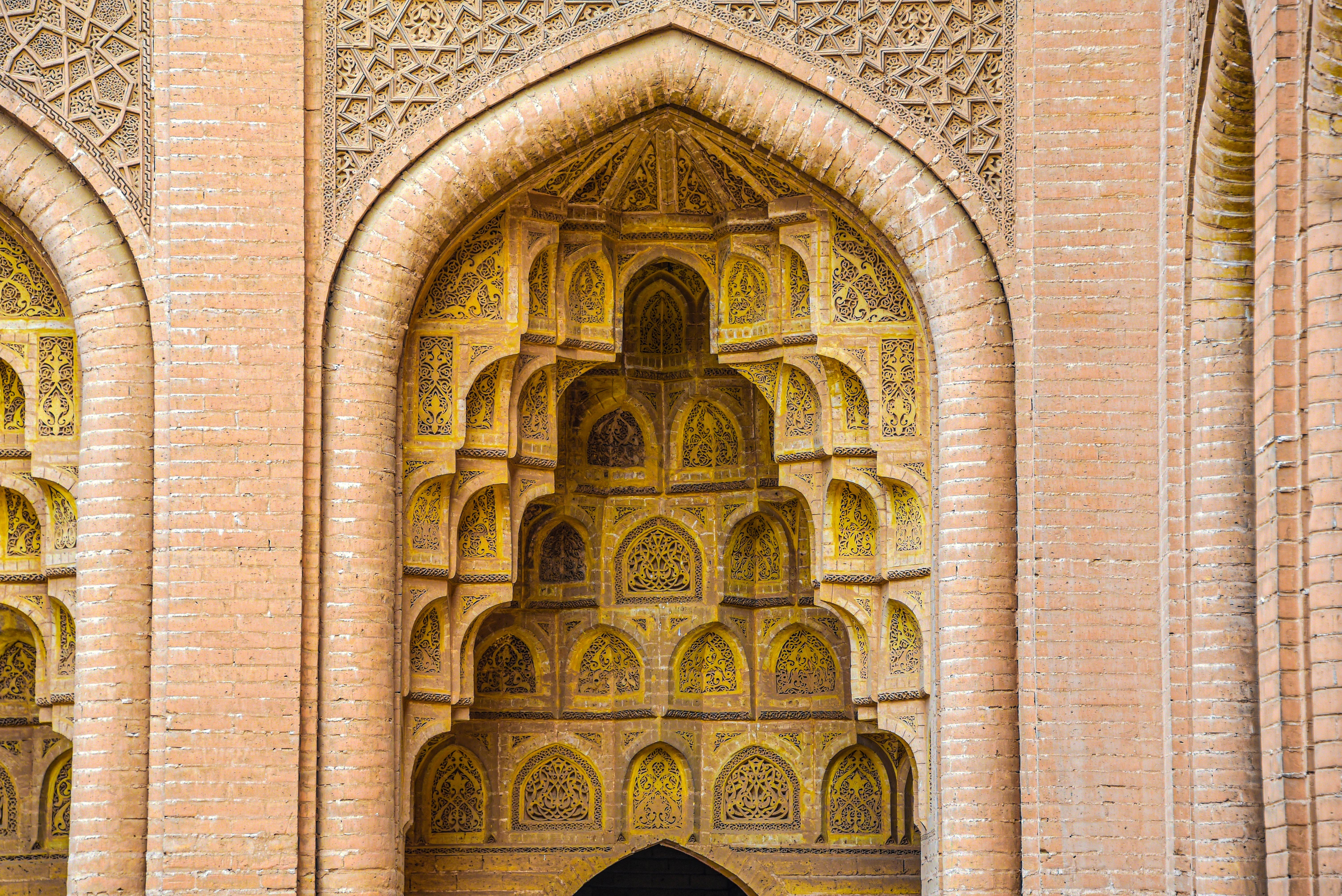
Pointed arch and muqarnas

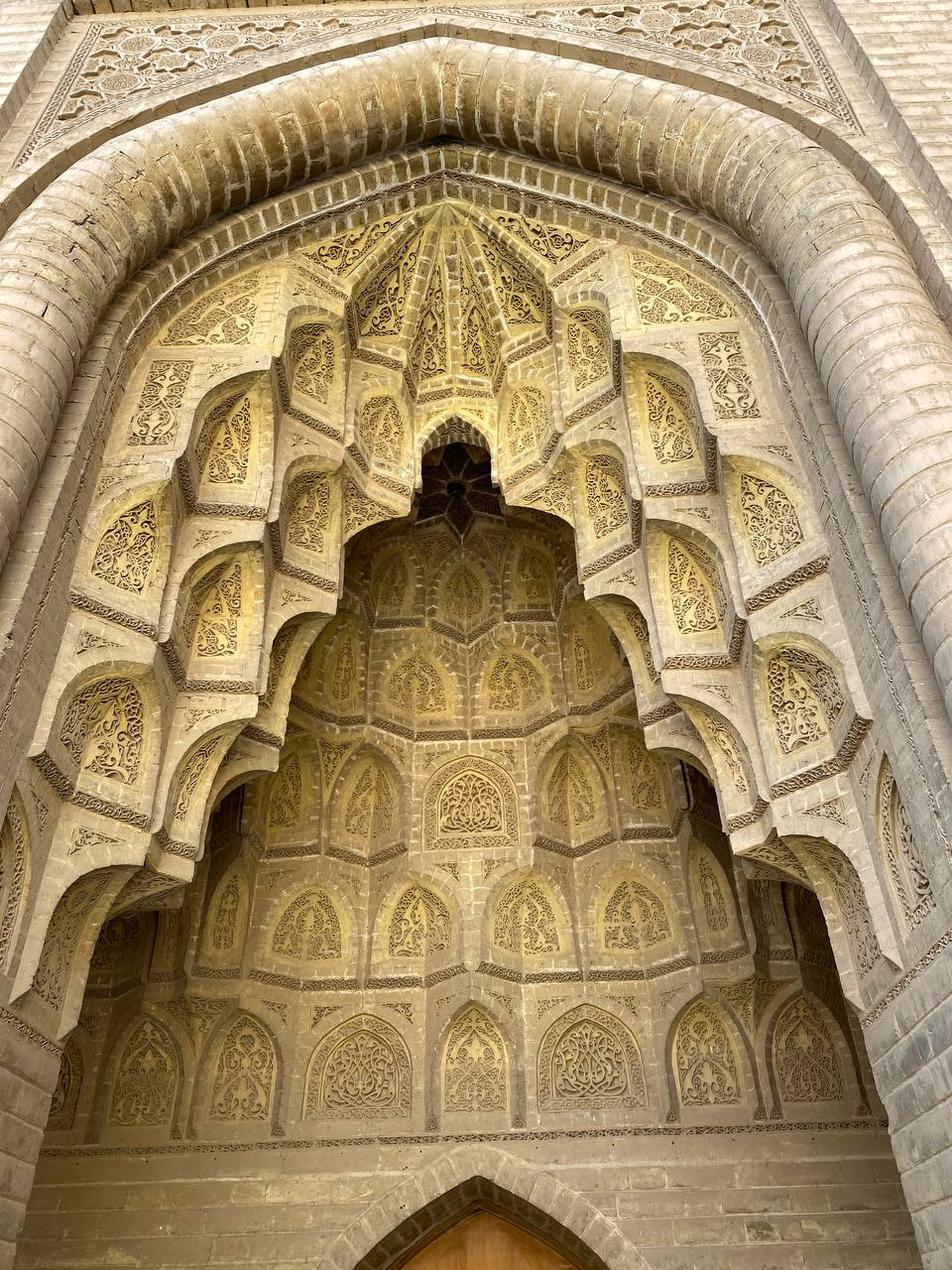
One of the arches in the Abbasid palace.

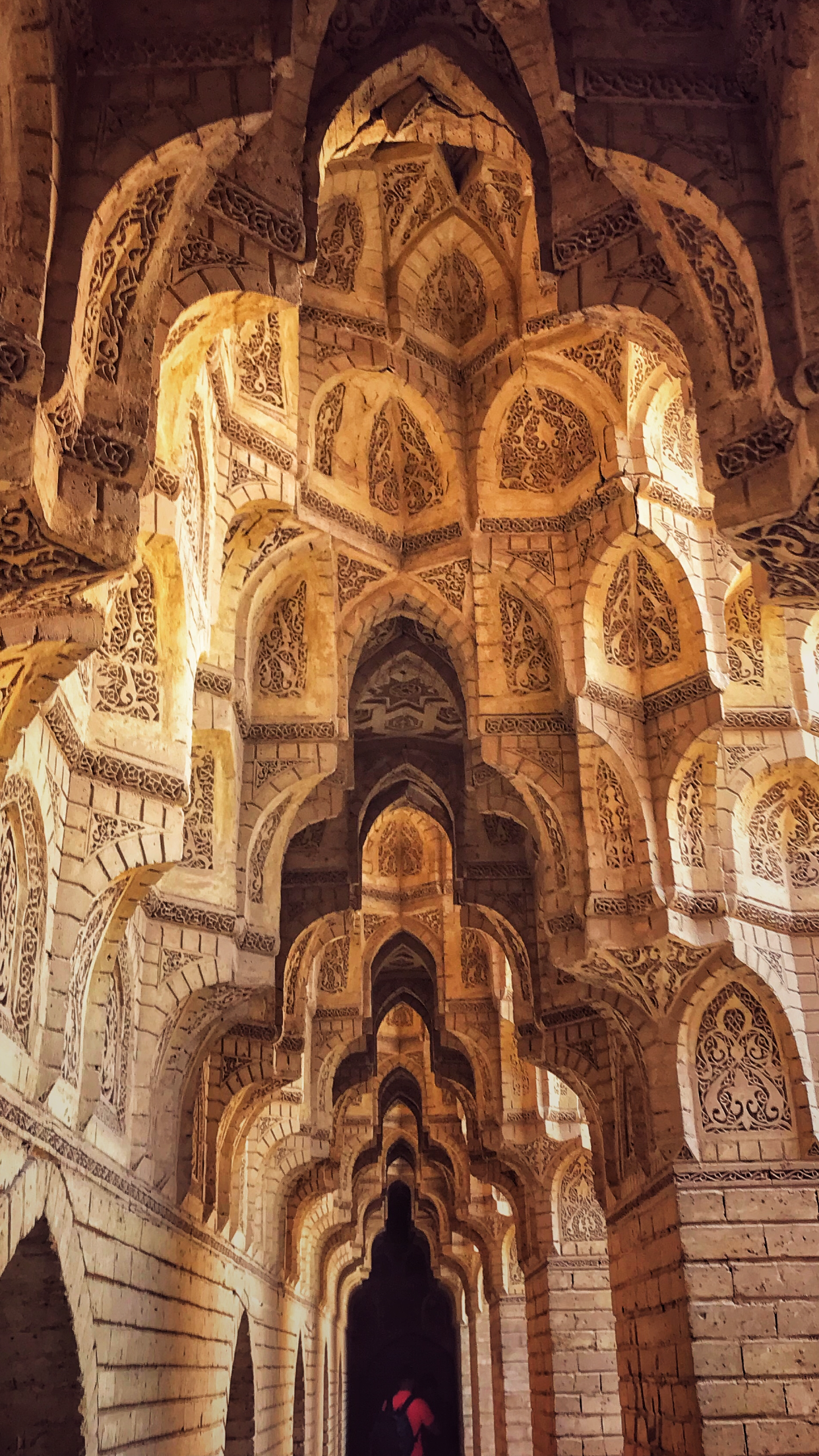
Muqarnas in the palace's halls.

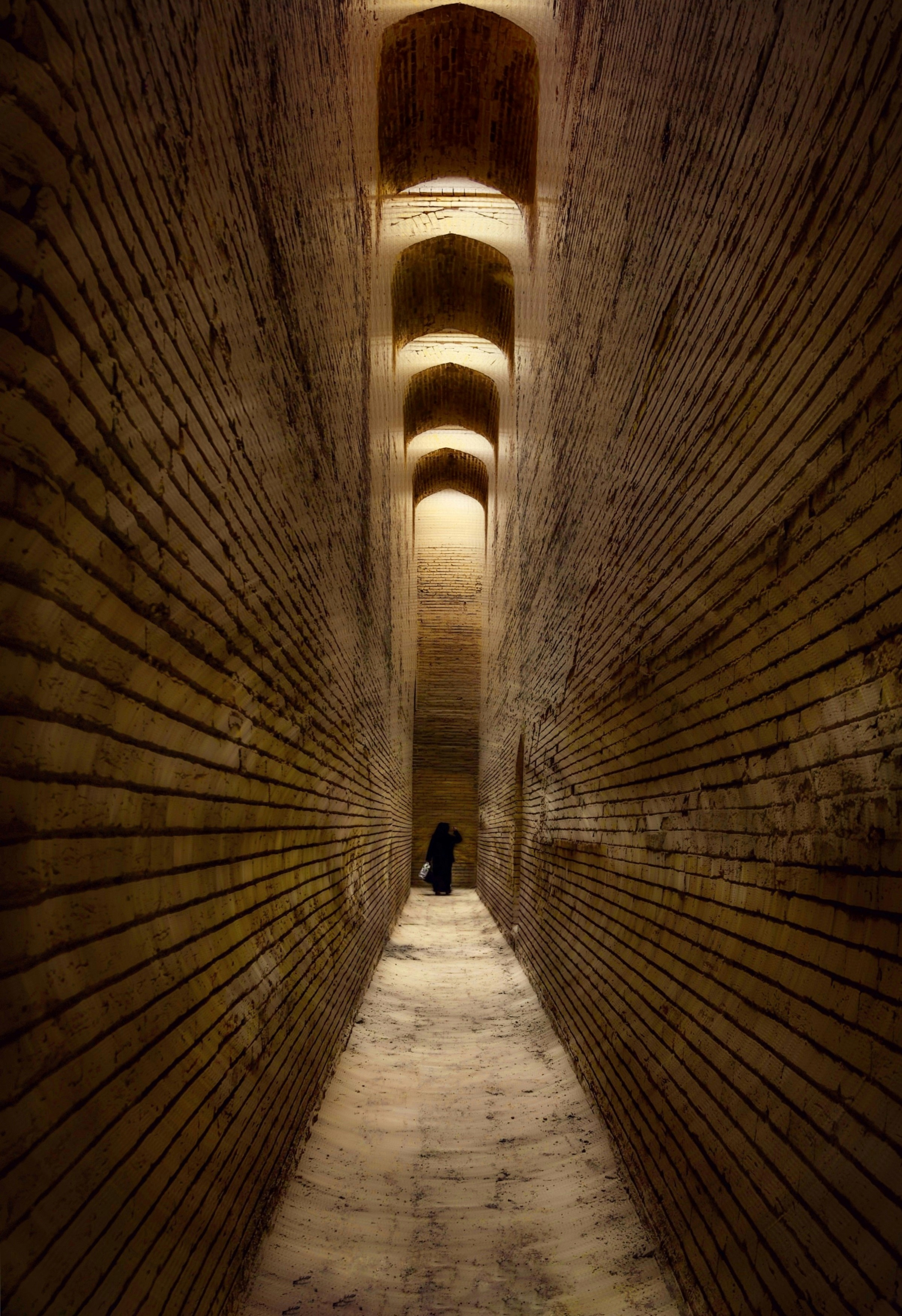
One of the palace's alleys.

Similar to the Mustansiriyya Madrasa, the center of the complex contains a courtyard shaped like a square. The eastern side is dominated by a massive iwan that leads to the gate that is undoubtedly the main gate to the entire complex. The massive keel-like shaped iwan is double-sized compared to the rest of the iwans that surround the courtyard and are arranged on two levels. Facing the massive iwan is a specious rectangular room which has been interpreted as a mosque area. Although the alleged mosque's room is flawed. Particularly, the room includes incorrect orientation to the Qibla by around 30 degrees. As well as lack of a mihrab and Qu'ranic inscriptions.

== See also ==
- Abbasid architecture
- Al-Khulafa Mosque
- Al-Mustansiriyya Madrasa
