= Betool Khedairi =

Iraqi novelist (born 1965)

- بتول الخضيري
- Born: 1965 (age 59–60); Baghdad, Iraq

Betool Khedairi (Arabic: بتول الخضيري; born 27 November 1965 in Baghdad, Iraq) is a novelist born to an Iraqi father and Scottish mother. She is most known for her debut novel, A Sky So Close which has been published in numerous languages such as Arabic, English, Italian, French and Dutch. The novel was first published in Lebanon in 1999 and is often used as the subject of literary critique studies in various international universities.

She received a BA in French literature in 1988 from the University of Mustansiriya in Baghdad, and then she used to divide her time between Iraq, Jordan and the United Kingdom while working in her family's business; in the food industry.

She lived in Iraq until she was 24 and now resides in Amman, Jordan.

== Themes ==
Absent has been described by Susan Comfort as a novel that features subjective stories about the effects of oil extraction, focusing on gender violence and women's survival, in Iraq during periods of war.

== Bibliography ==
- A Sky So Close (translated by Muhayman Jamil)
- Absent (translated by Muhayman Jamil)
