= Mustansiriyya Madrasa =

Medieval-era scholarly complex in Baghdad, Iraq

- Arabic: المدرسة المستنصرية
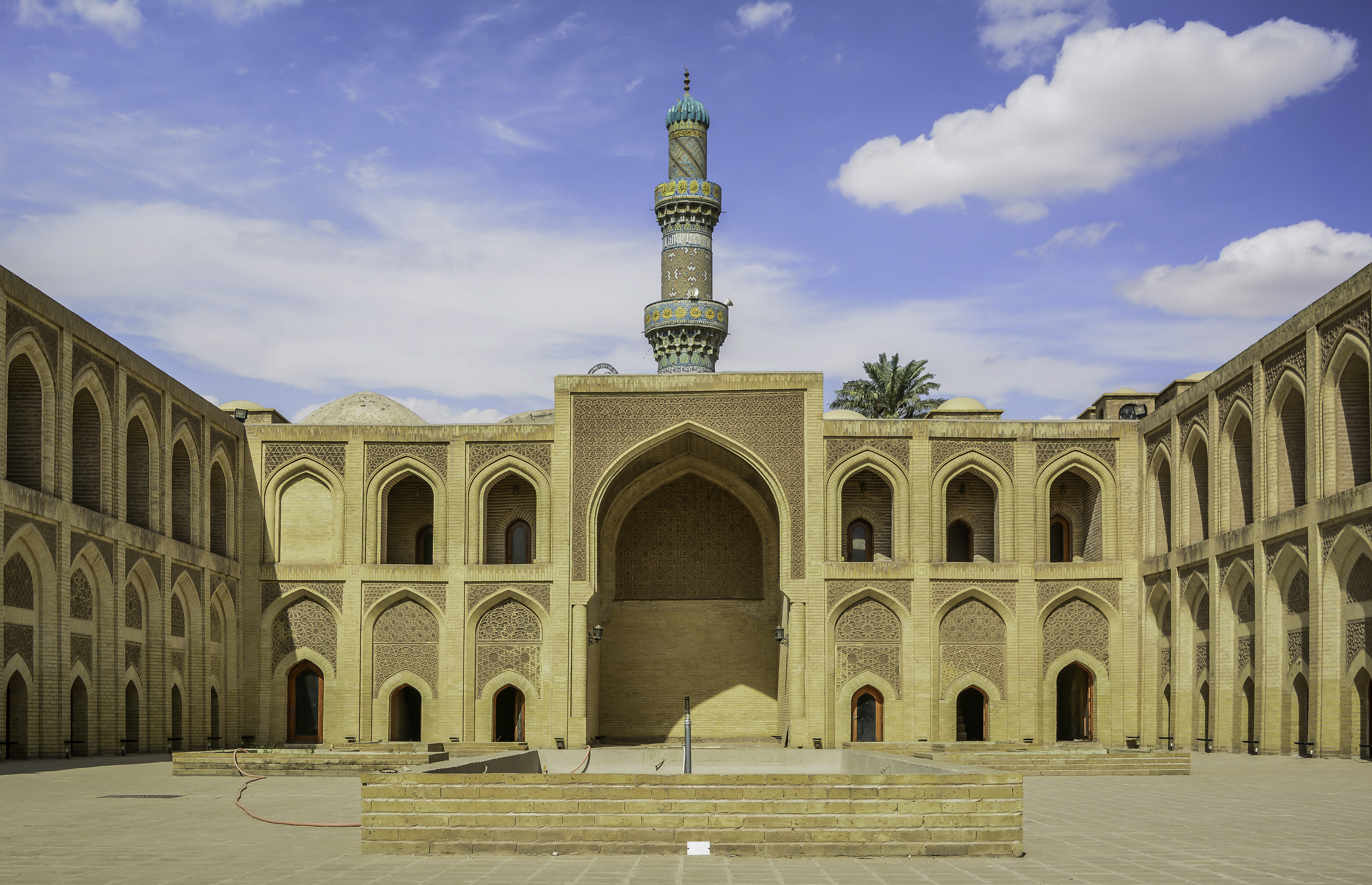
- The courtyard of the madrasa

- Location within Baghdad

Religion
- Affiliation: Islamic
- Ownership: Al-Mustansiriya University

Location
- Location: Baghdad, Iraq
- Interactive map of Mustansiriyya Madrasa
- Coordinates: 33°20′18.6″N 44°23′22.56″E

Architecture
- Type: Islamic architecture
- Style: Abbasid
- Founder: Caliph Mansur al-Mustansir
- Established: 6 April 1233; 793 years ago

The Mustansiriyya Madrasa (Arabic: المدرسة المستنصرية, romanized: al-Madrasa l-Mustanṣiriyya, lit. 'the Mustansirite School') was a medieval-era scholarly complex in Baghdad, Iraq, that provided a universal system of higher education. It was established in 1227 CE and was named after and built by the Abbasid caliph al-Mustansir. The madrasa taught many different subjects, including medicine, math, literature, grammar, philosophy, and Islamic religious studies. However, the major focus of education was Islamic law. It became the most prominent and high-ranking center for Islamic studies in all of Baghdad.

The architecture of the madrasa was also an important example of Islamic architectural development in Baghdad. The madrasa has experienced several periods of decline and reemergence throughout its history. The most significant degradation to the madrasa's architecture and position within Baghdad was the 1258 Mongol Siege of Baghdad. Today, the complex is in a state of restoration as is it being overseen by the Directorate of Antiquities in Iraq. It is currently a part of al-Mustansiriyya University, and is located on the left bank of the Tigris.

The Mustansiriyya Madrasa remains one of the only surviving and authentic landmarks of Abbasid Baghdad. It is officially listed as a part of a tentative UNESCO World Heritage Site list as an important example of historical Baghdad.

== Historical background ==
=== Establishment in the late Abbasid Period ===
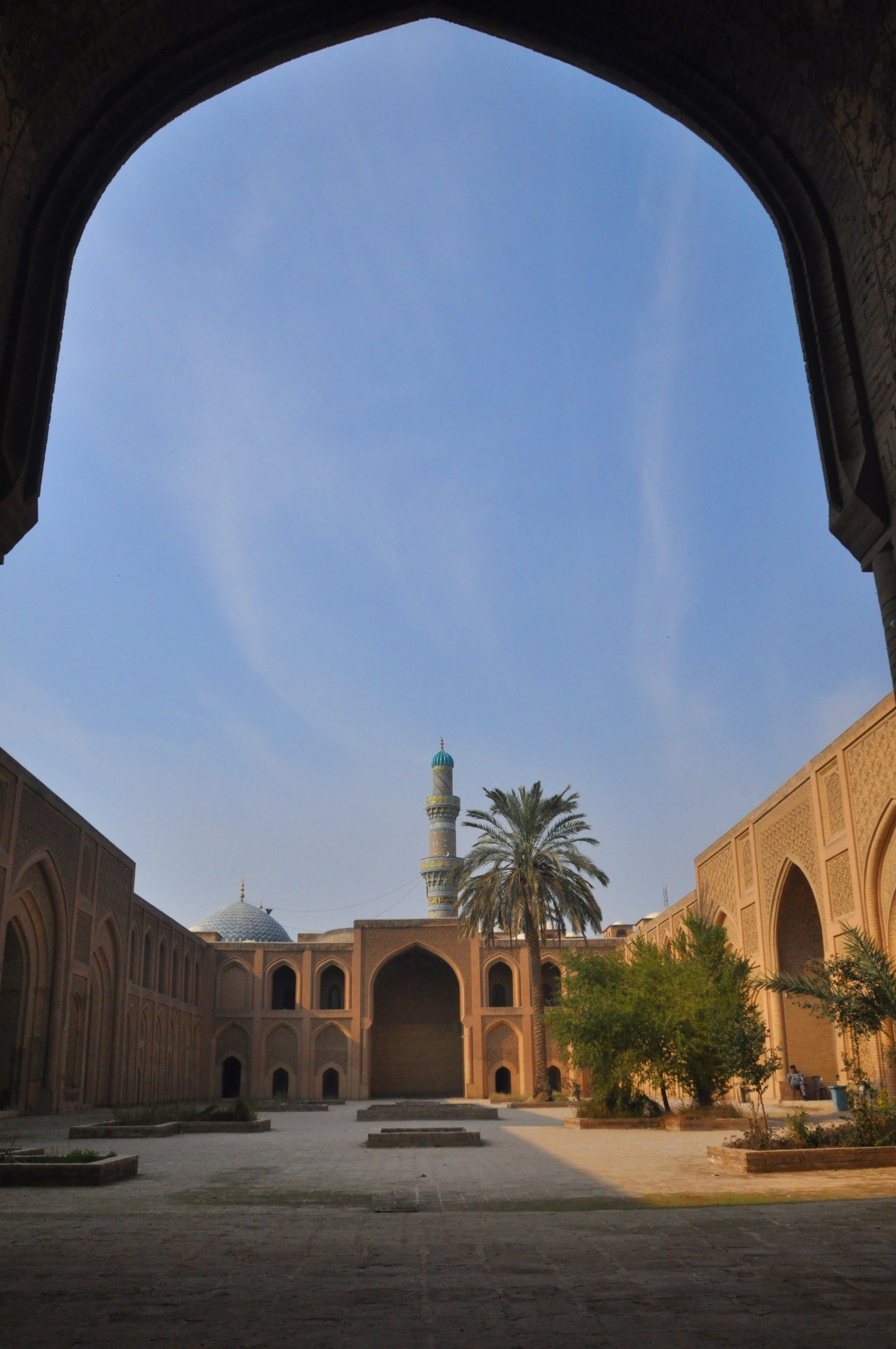
The madrasa contains a green courtyard surrounded by two floors that lead to several rooms and iwans.

Madrasas during the Abbasid period were used as the predominant instrument to foster the spread of Islamic and scientific thought as well as a way to extend the founder's pious ideals.

This madrasa was established by Caliph al-Mustansir and its cost amounted to 700 thousand dinars, and it was opened for study on the 6th of April, 1233, and a large celebration and feast was held in its opening. It was the first Islamic university in which the study of jurisprudence based on the four schools of thought; Hanafi, Shafi’i, Maliki, and Hanbali and all were combined into “one school.” This inspired the Salihiyya Madrasa in Cairo which was established almost a decade after the Baghdadi madrasa and also taught and mixed four schools of thought into one. In addition to theological schools of thought, it also had several other disciplines such as mathematics, algebra, and philosophy. The scholarly university provided students from all over Iraq with academic education, lodgings, clothes, food, and monthly allowances.

The management of the madrasa was carried out by a headmaster who was chosen by the senior state employees. The headmaster was assisted by a number of assistants, led by the supervisor, who was like the financial inspector. A number of employees were also hired to serve the teachers and students. Teachers usually consisted of senior Sheikhs and Imams from Iraq, the Levant and Egypt who were known for their deep research and study. Some of the teachers were also assisted by higher teachers. Employees of the Madrasa also had a salary. Due to the diversity of its subjects, the madrasa had several institutions established by al-Mustansir that taught several different subjects.

In 1235, an early monumental water-powered alarm clock that announced the appointed hours of prayer and the time both by day and by night was completed in the entrance hall of the Mustansiriyya Madrasa in Baghdad.

=== Education and features ===
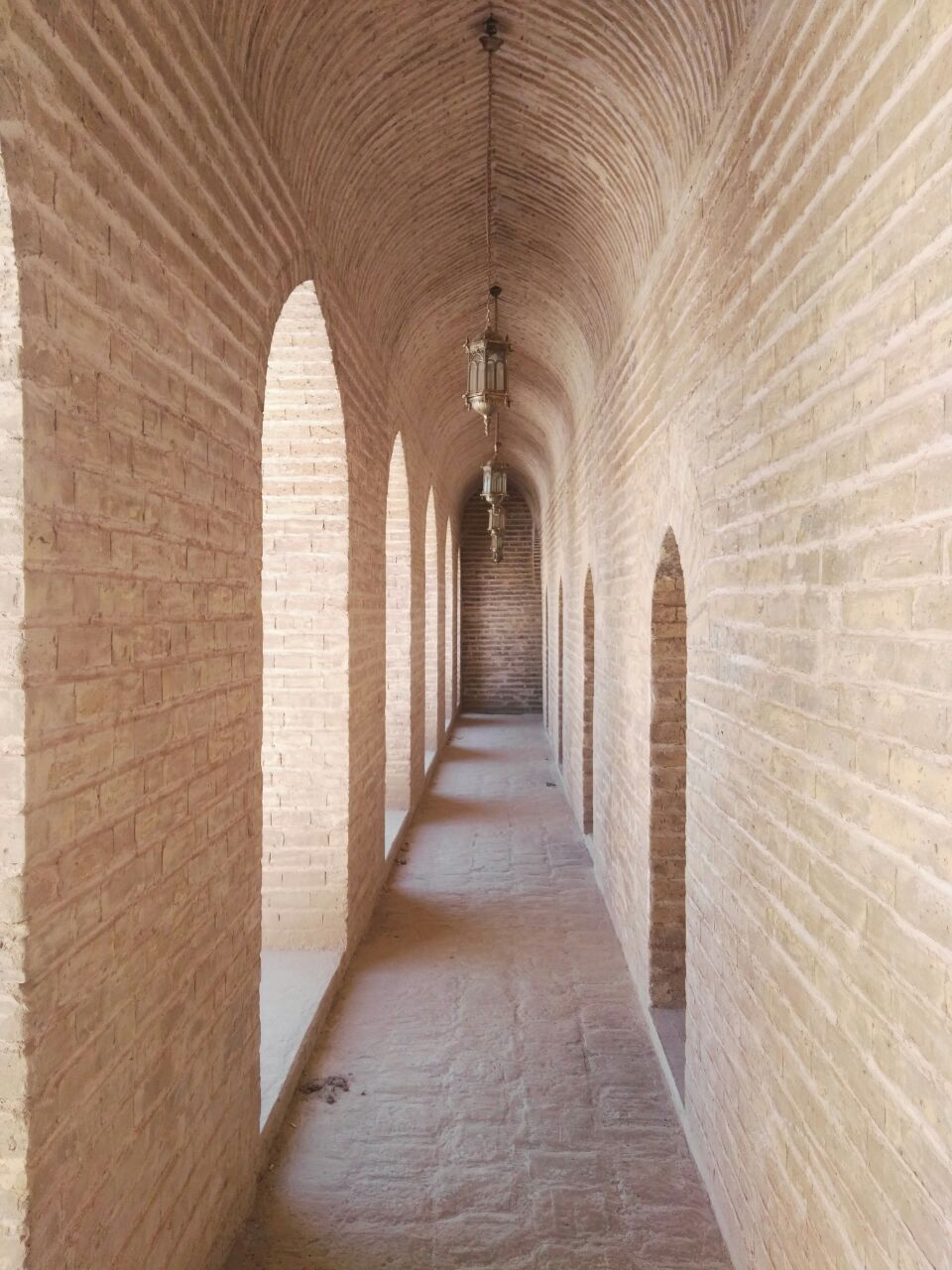
One of the hallways that lead to several classrooms in the scholarly complex.

Within the school of Islamic studies, there were specific institutions of Islamic knowledge. The divisions included the Dar al-Hadith, in which a high level sheikh and a Qur'an Qāriʾ would recite hadiths every Monday, Thursday, and Saturday to a class of ten. Dar al-Hadith was dedicated to the study of the sayings and traditions of the Prophet Muhammad. Another significant institution was the Dar al-Qur’an, which was dedicated to the study and recitation of the Qur’an. There was a designated reciter of the Qur'an and a fellow aid to help teach the students. Along with the students, there were thirty orphans who were housed in the complex. All students, including the orphans, were designated an equal wage, bread, and stew. Within this school, there was a senior scholar, or Shiekh, who held the highest position of education within the scholarly complex.

Additionally, the School of Medicine was housed in the Mustansiriyya Madrasa. The School of Medicine was led by a senior Muslim physician who was required to have ten students employed to him. There was also a hospital located in the Madrasa, allowing medical students to learn and practice medicine within the same complex.

Despite the fact that Muslim jurists taught in the scholarly complex and its institutions, evidence in Ibn al-Athir's The Complete History suggests that none-Muslims were not forbidden from also teaching. In fact, Abbasid Caliphs had encouraged Christian and Jewish scholars, who had their own institutions and religious monasteries, to teach in the scholarly complex.

The Mustansiriya Madrasa included a variety of buildings such as a hammam, public hospital, pharmacy, food storage site, and kitchen. There was also space designated for student residences. The Madrasa provided food, lodging, clothing, and a monthly stipend for its students. Its library had an initial collection of 80,000 volumes, given by the Caliph. The collection was said to have grown to 400,000 volumes, although the reports of both these figures may have been exaggerated.

Even though the libraries’ collection survived the Mongol sack of 1258 CE, it was merged with that of the Nizamiyya of Baghdad in 1393 CE, whose collection had subsequently been dispersed or disappeared. As a result of the Ottoman invasion and capture of Baghdad in 1534 CE, books from the palaces and libraries were taken as the spoils of war and became an important part of the royal library in Istanbul.

=== Decline and later use ===
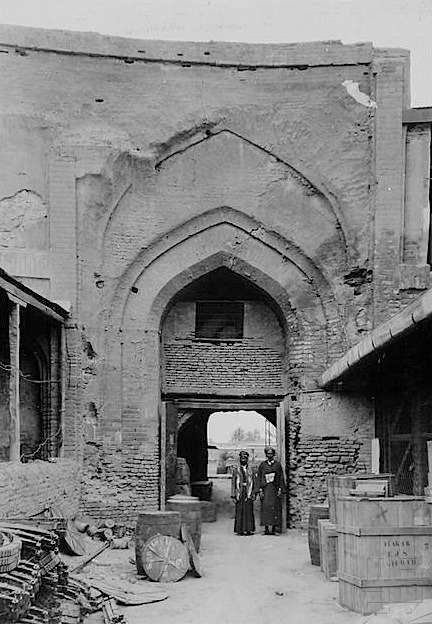
The Mustansiriyya Madrasa's gate in the 1930s.

After the 13th century, the madrasa experienced a period of decline in prominence, followed by fluctuating centuries of purpose and power. The widespread annihilation and conquest of the Mongols throughout the Middle East resulted in the first stages of transformation for the complex. The Mongol Sack of 1258 devastated parts of the Madrasa that were later restored. After the initial attack, the Mongols settled in Baghdad under the emperors of the Il-Khanids. Among the notables of the madrasa during this period was the librarian and historian Ibn al-Fuwati who returned to Baghdad in 1281 and was appointed director of the Madrasa.

Under Timur, the madrasas of Baghdad, including this one, suffered greatly and studies in them were suspended. He had destroyed Baghdad twice, first in 1392 and second in 1400, and destroyed its schools; he took many of its writers, engineers, and architects to Samarkand. The Madrasa's library has also lost thousands of books and a large number of its scholars left Baghdad to Egypt, the Levant, and other Islamic countries at the time. Two centuries after Tamerlane's destruction, there was an attempt at revival in 1589 but it closed its doors in 1638. In its place, the Mosque-Madrasa of al-Asifyah was established and connected to the Madrasa.

In 1534, the Ottoman Turks seized control, maintaining a stable reign until the British accession in the early 20th century. During the late 18th to early 20th century, the Mustansiriyya Madrasa was used largely for military purposes such as serving as a place of rest and resource as well as a storage house for soldier uniforms. This multipurpose building also became known as the Khan al-Muwasilah in the 18th century specifically, which served as a caravanserai for traders passing through Baghdad. Over the years, the madrasa suffered from neglect, and much of the building was lost until 1960 when the Iraqi government restored the Madrasa's complex and opened it for visits and tourists as a historic monument.

== Architecture ==
=== Layout ===
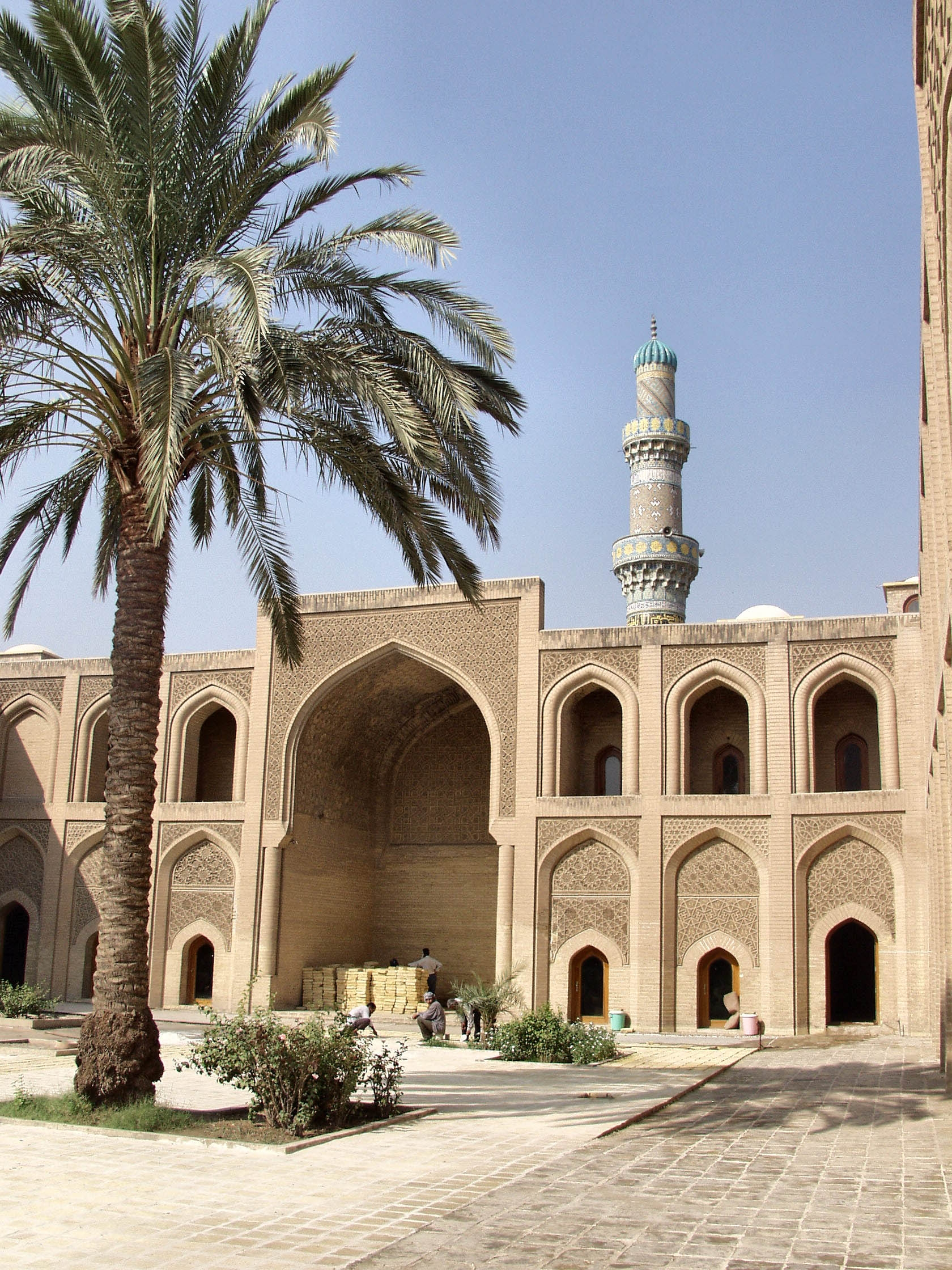
Mustansiriya University Building in Baghdad 2005

The Mustansiriyya Madrasa is one of the only buildings still standing that provides evidence for Baghdad's role as a center for Islamic Art and for the city's role in the development of geometric ornaments. The layout of the Madrasa is a basic four-iwan plan fit into a two-story rectangular building with a large courtyard. Each school of Islamic law was designated to a separate corner of the building.

=== Decorations ===
Some of the main decorative features includes muqarnas; series of interconnected vaults used to highlight squinch zones of domes or exterior of minarets and domes. The Mustansiriyya incorporates arabesque and carved brick decoration in an exterior tripartite façade. The main entrance is made up of three conical archways, star and polygon figures, and an inscription describing the patron of the building, al-Mustansir. Earlier Umayyad and Abbasid themes of foliage and greenery are also evoked in the exterior façade of the entrance archways. The other entrances are ornately decorated with geometric patterns of zig-zags, square designs, and ornamentation centered around water. The southwestern entrance also includes a later inscription about the Ottoman Sultan Abd al-Aziz.

General elements of the madrasa

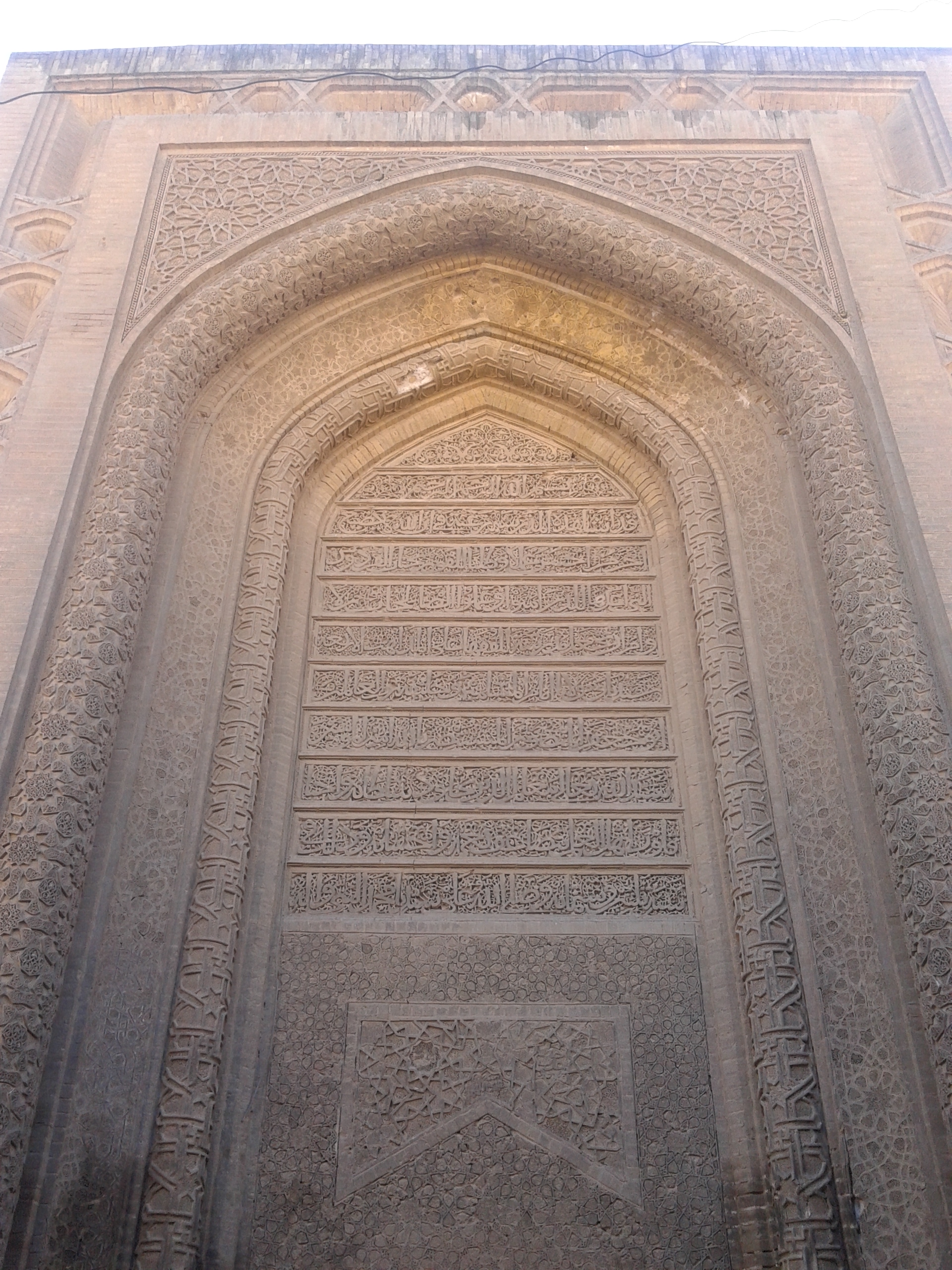
Gate of the Madrasa which includes Qu'ranic verses.

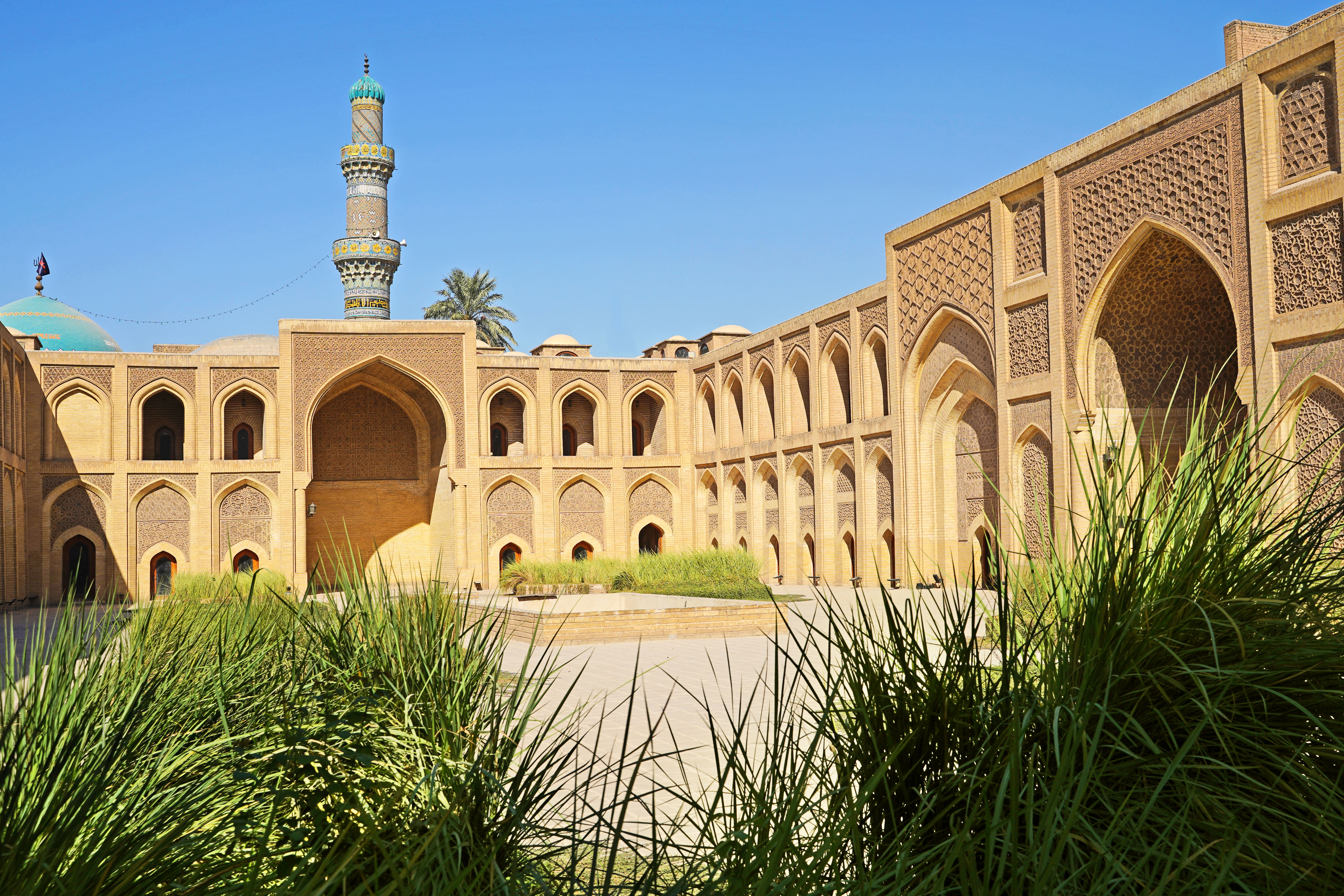
The courtyard of the madrasa.

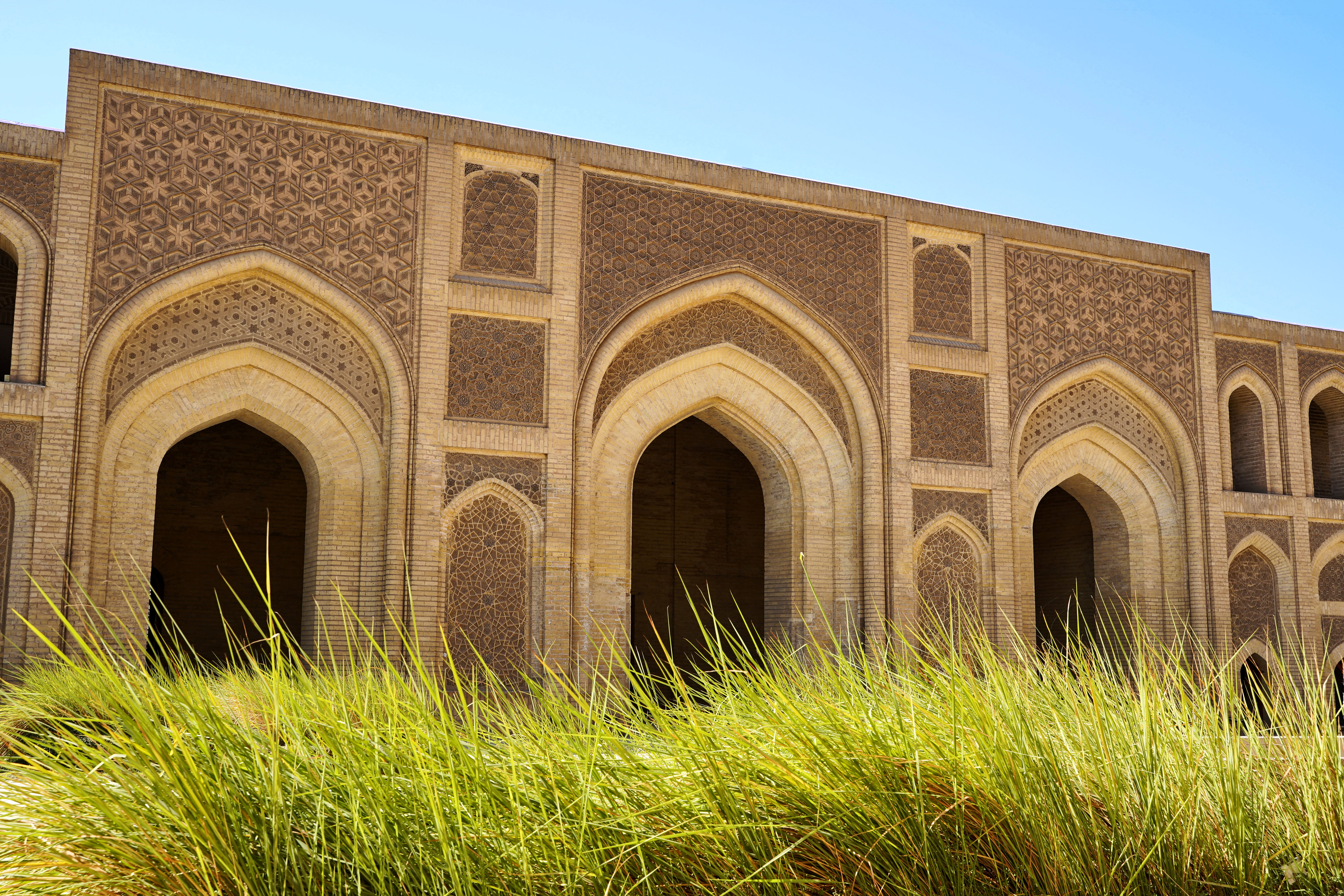
Three of the arched openings of the madrasa's complex.

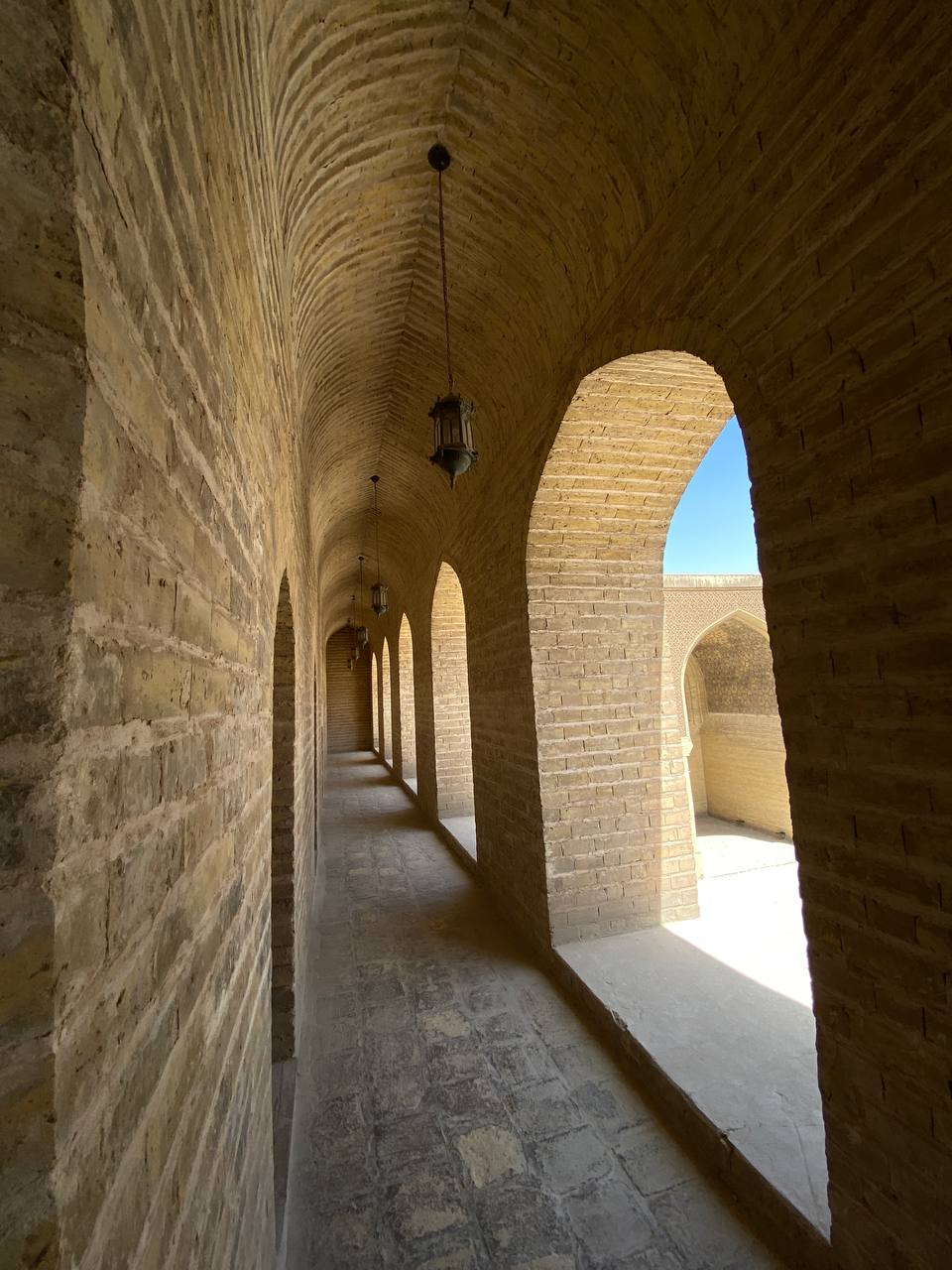
Inside one of the corridors on the second floor.

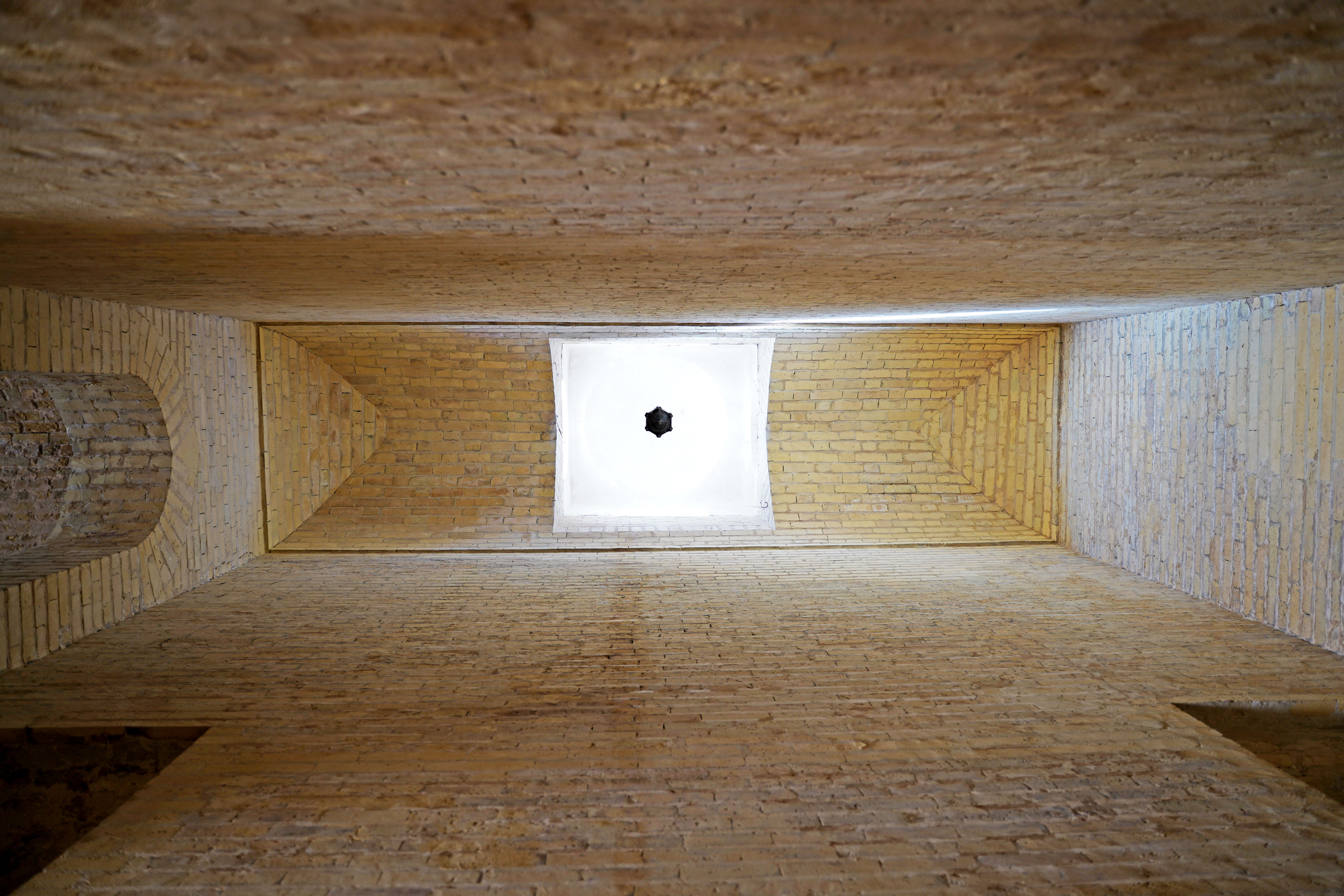
A rooftop which includes a dome of the madrasa.

== Water clock ==
There's evidence that suggests that in 1235, the madrasa contained an example of an early monumental water-powered alarm clock that announced the appointed hours of prayer and the time both by day and by night in the entrance hall as the Abbasids had many of these water-powered clocks at the time. The clock was said to be built by a man named "Ali Ibn Tha’lab" and based on the traditional clocks found in Damascus at the time. The clock included metallic and golden doors; bird figurines dropping metal balls into vessels that told the elapsing of an hour during the day as well as functions and lighting to announce the night which mirrored the movements of celestial objects. Furthermore, the clock was mentioned with great detail in aI-Hawadith al-Jami'a Wal-Tajarub al-Nafi'a Fi al-Mi'a al-Sabi'a by Ibn al-Fuwati which dealt with the period of Iraq before the Mongol invasion. It is safe to assume that since Ibn al-Fuwati was a native of Baghdad, the following description he gave on the clock was either his eyewitness account or one that he heard firsthand from another person. Ibn al-Fuwati recounts:

On the outside wall of this counter was a circle on which there was a depiction of the heavens, and on it were many finely decorated bronze arches housing finely decorated doors. Within the circle were two model falcons, made of gold, each inside a golden bowl. Two bronze ball bearings were positioned behind each falcon so that they were not visible to the observer. At the moment of the elapsing of an hour, the mouth of each falcon opened, and out fell the ball bearings. Each time a ball bearing fell, one of the doors inside the arches opened. The doors were golden, but they then became silver (i.e. the golden door was replaced by a silver one). When the ball bearings fall into the bowls below they then run back to their original positions. Then golden planets ascend into the azure sky within this depiction of the heavens simultaneously with the rising of the real sun in the sky. They move [on the clock face] mirroring the movement of the sun across the sky [so that they eventually] descend and disappear with the setting of the sun. When night comes then there are planets that gradually emerge [to the observer] because of a light glowing from behind them. The [strength of the] light emitting from the discs of the planets [grows gradually and] reaches its fullest intensity on the completion of a full hour. Then this process begins in the next planet-disc and so on until the night ends and the sun begins to rise. In this way, you can know the times of the prayers.

== Modern-day use and restoration ==
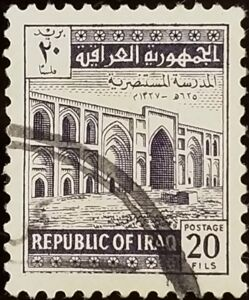
A 1963 Iraqi stamp that features the Mustansiriyya Madrasa

In 1973, the Mustansiriyya Madrasa was overseen by the Directorate of Antiquities in Iraq. Since then, the complex has been in a consistent state of reconstruction. Recently, the modern businesses surrounding the madrasa have been demolished with the intention of restoring the original perimeters of the complex. As a result of the reconstruction and conservation of this complex, the Mustansiriyya Madrasa still plays an important role in Baghdad as the madrasa is now part of al-Mustansiriyya University.

Currently, the Minister of Culture takes care of the complex of the madrasa. The Mustansiriyya Madrasa was included on the list of the Islamic World Educational, Scientific and Cultural Organization (ISESCO) in 2013, due to its great importance and significance in Islamic history. Generally, the Mustansiriyya Madrasa is sometimes recognized as the first university of its time. In 2020, the Abbasid complex was closed for maintenance and restoration purposes although the restoration was stretched due to the COVID-19 pandemic. The complex is also fenced with an iron fence surrounding it on all sides.

== See also ==
- Abbasid architecture
- Abbasid Palace
- Education in Iraq
- Al-Khulafa Mosque
