= Kasim Muhammad Taqi al-Sahlani =

Iraqi politician

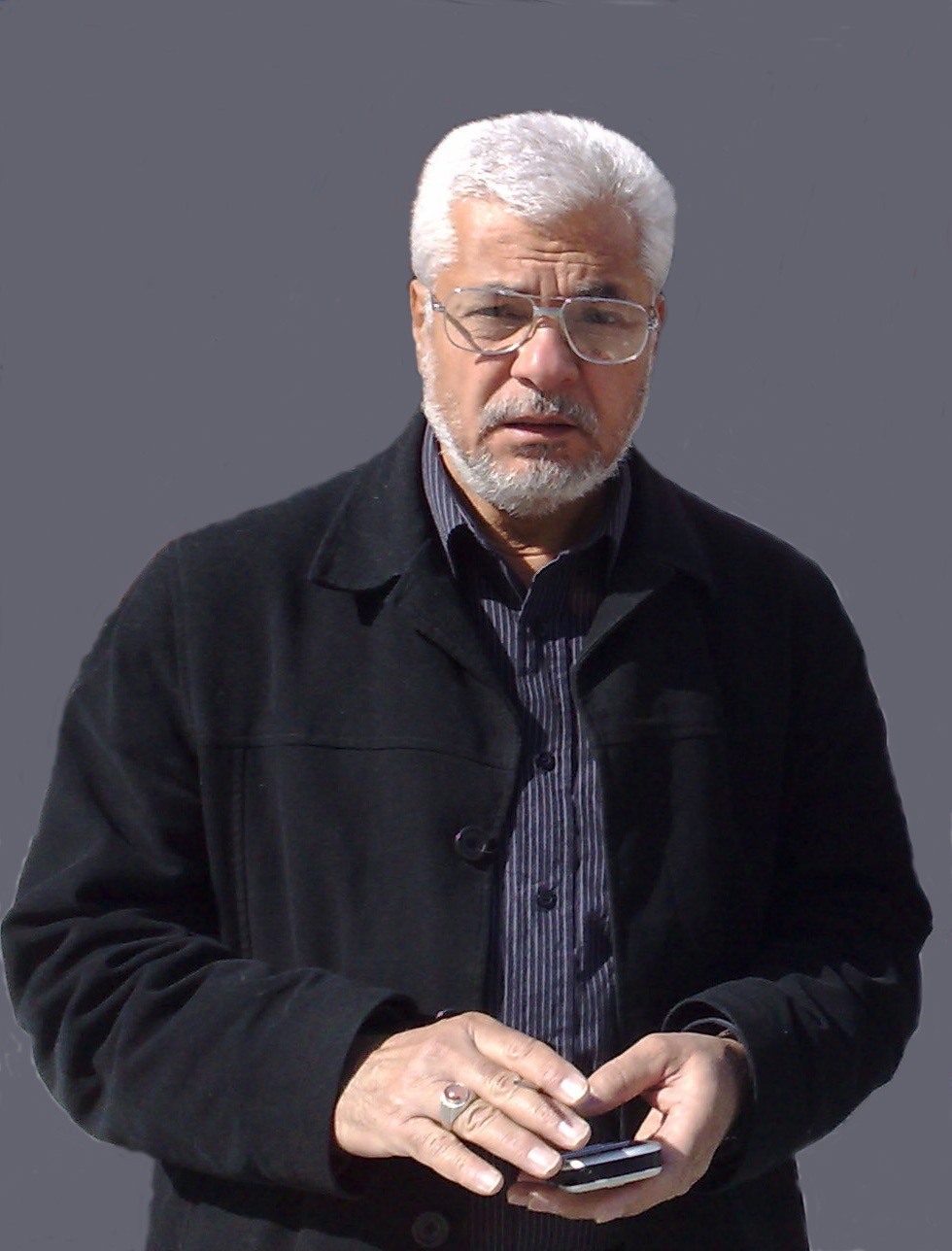

Personal details
- Born: 1949 Maysan, Iraq
- Died: June 21, 2009 (aged 59–60) Iraq
- Education: University of Pittsburgh (Ph.D., uncompleted); Al-Mustansiriya University
- Profession: Teacher, politician

Kasim Muhammad Taqi al-Sahlani (1949 – 21 June 2009) was an Iraqi politician. He was a member of the National Assembly of Iraq and was the head of the parliamentary bloc of the Islamic Dawa Party - Iraq Organisation, the fifth largest party within the ruling United Iraqi Alliance coalition. Furthermore, he was a member of the National Assembly's Foreign Affairs Committee.

== Biography ==
Al-Sahlani was born in Maysan in 1949. His Father Mohammad Taqi Ali al-Sahlani was the Chief Administrator of the Maysan Governorate. Kasim al-Sahlani graduated from the Maysan Teaching Institute in 1969 and became a primary school teacher in Baghdad. Whilst teaching he also studied at the Al-Mustansiriya University. He graduated with a BA in Counselling, Guidance and Psychology.

In 1979 Al-Sahlani left Iraq for the USA where he studied for his PhD in Psychology at the University of Pittsburgh. Al-Sahlani was unable to complete his PhD though, as he was pursued and harassed incessantly by members of the Baathist regime (Mokabaraat), and forced to abandon his studies. The next few years saw him travel to many countries before finally settling in the UK where he became an important figure in the Iraqi opposition to Saddam's regime.

Kasim al-Sahlani joined the Islamic Dawa Party in 1968 and became part of its leadership in 1994. He was one of the first members of the Iraqi opposition to return to Iraq and begin his work in rebuilding the war-torn country,

In 2004, Al-Sahlani was elected as a member of The National Council which consisted of 100 members: 81 members were elected to the interim National Council, and 19 members previously selected from the Governing Council. In the general elections of 2005 he was elected to the Council of Representatives of Iraq and became the head of the parliamentary bloc of the Islamic Dawa Party - Iraq Organisation.

Kasim al-Sahlani was killed in a traffic accident (21 June 2009), while traveling on official duties from Basra to Nasiriyah. His sudden death saw thousands of mourners turning out to pay their final respects all over Iraq and especially in the cities of Nasiriyah and Najaf as his body was transported to its final resting place, He left behind his wife and 6 children.
