= Ibn al-Fuwati =

Medieval librarian and historian

Kamāl al-Dīn ʿAbd al-Razzāḳ ibn Aḥmad ibn al-Fuwaṭī (Arabic: عبد الرزاق بن أحمد بن الفوطي) best known as Ibn al-Fuwati (25 June 1244 – 1323), was a medieval librarian and historian who wrote a great deal, but whose works have mostly been lost. His most important extant work is the Talḵīṣ, a biographical dictionary.

== Biography ==
Ibn al-Fuwati was born on 25 June 1244 in Baghdad. His family originated in Marw al-Rudh in Khurasan. His nisba indicates that one of his parents was a seller of waist wraps (Arabic: fūṭa, plural: fowaṭ). Aged 14, he was enslaved and incarcerated by the Mongols at the Siege of Baghdad (1258) and was subsequently brought to Adharbayjan. In 1261/2, he joined Nasir al-Din al-Tusi in Maragheh and was appointed librarian of the Maragheh observatory by Tusi. While in Maragheh, Ibn al-Fuwati wrote a biographical dictionary of astronomers, the Taḏkerat man qaṣada’l-raṣad (non-extant). He stayed in Maragheh together with Tusi's son and successor Asil al-Din. In 1281, Ibn al-Fuwati returned to Baghdad on the request of Ata-Malik Juvayni and was appointed director of the Mustansiriya School.

Ibn al-Fuwati visited Adharbayjan at least three times between 1304 and 1316. He retired to Baghdad after the execution of Rashid-al-Din Hamadani in 1318. Charles P. Melville suggests that some of Ibn al-Fuwati's works were destroyed during the subsequent sack of the Rashidiya quarter. Ibn al-Fuwati's religious beliefs were not strictly categorizable, for he is variously claimed to have been a Hanbalite, Shafi'ite, Shi'ite, and Sufi. He drank wine and was renowned for his calligraphical works. He died in 1323 in Baghdad.

== Literary output ==
Ibn al-Fuwait's most important extant work is his biographical dictionary, the Talḵīṣ. The Talḵīṣ is believed to be an abridgement of the Majmaʿal-ādāb fī moʿjam al-alqāb. However, it may be that the Majmaʿal-ādāb fī moʿjam al-alqāb never even existed. Melville notes that even if the work did exist, it was probably never completed. The Talḵīṣ itself was also never completed, for many entries are unfinished or left blank. The exact scope of the Talḵīṣ is not clearly defined, as it appears to include a wide array of people whose names Ibn al-Fuwati had come across. Most entries cover people from present-day Iraq and present-day western and central Iran, especially Isfahan. Melville notes that the Talḵīṣ contains a wealth of information about the intellectual and cultural life of the Ilkhanate.

Ibn al-Fuwati studied Mongolian and Persian; although he did not write books in Persian, he did own a memorabilia book (majmu'a) for Persian poetry. In his Talḵīṣ, Ibn al-Fuwati occasionally quotes Persian poetry.

== Sources ==
- Melville, Charles (1997). "EBN AL-FOWAṬĪ, KAMĀL-AL-DĪN ʿABD-AL-RAZZĀQ". Encyclopaedia Iranica, Vol. VIII, Fasc. 1. pp. 25–26.
- Rosenthal, F. (1971). "Ibn al-Fuwaṭī". In Lewis, B.; Ménage, V. L.; Pellat, Ch. & Schacht, J. (eds.). The Encyclopaedia of Islam, Second Edition. Volume III: H–Iram. Leiden: E. J. Brill. pp. 769–770. OCLC 495469525.
