= Abdullatif Ahmad Mustafa =

Kurdish religious figure and Salafi preacher

Sheikh Abdullatif Ahmad Mustafa

Personal life
- Born: 1969 (age 56–57) Iraqi Kurdistan
- Education: Al-Mustansiriya University
- Occupation: Salafi preacher, TV channel owner

Religious life
- Religion: Sunni Islam (Salafism)

Abdullatif Ahmad Mustafa (born 1969) is a Kurdish religious figure and a Salafi preacher in Iraqi Kurdistan.

== Personal life ==
After completing his primary, secondary and high school education, he went to Baghdad to learn Arabic and was admitted to the Arabic Department of Al-Mustansiriya University. After graduating from the university in 1992, he was employed as a teacher in Chwarqurna, a small city in Ranya District. After a while, he left the country and visited several other Islamic countries to study Sharia. He later completed his master's and doctorate in Tikrit. He then earned another doctorate in Saudi Arabia.

Abdullatif Ahmad has appeared in Kurdish media several times. In 2012, he appeared in a series of videos on NRT News. He is currently the director of Amozhgari, a Salafi channel in the Kurdish language, and the imam of the Behesht Mosque in Sulaymaniyah.

=== 2026 sexual harassment allegations and dismissal ===
In June 2026, leaked audio recordings and text messages circulated on Kurdish social media allegedly capturing Abdul Latif sexually harassing female university students. The material, initially released by Kurdish activist Bilal Hama, purportedly featured Latif offering examination papers in exchange for sexual favors or promises of marriage. In one audio recording, he was allegedly heard asking a student to remove her hijab and perform oral sex in his vehicle.

Following the circulation of the leaks, the University of Sulaimani and the Kurdistan Regional Government's (KRG) Ministry of Higher Education launched a formal investigation. On July 1, 2026, Higher Education Minister Aram Mohammed Qadir issued a decision permanently dismissing Abdul Latif from his academic position at the university's College of Islamic Sciences. The disciplinary ruling, enacted under the State and Public Sector Employees Discipline Law No. 14 of 1991, permanently barred him from future public employment and stripped him of his state pension rights.

Following the dismissal, the Union of Islamic Religious Scholars of Kurdistan publicly distanced itself from Abdul Latif. The Union issued a statement clarifying that Latif was not a member of their organization and urged the KRG's Ministry of Endowment and Religious Affairs to pursue further legal and administrative measures. The Union also requested that the public not use the allegations against an individual to disparage religious institutions as a whole. Calls were also made by local Muslim scholars to ban him from delivering Friday sermons at the Bahasht Mosque.

Abdul Latif vehemently denied the allegations, claiming that the leaked audio and chat messages were fabricated using artificial intelligence. Following his termination, his legal team rejected the ministry's decision as "unjust" and "unlawful," arguing it had been made under external pressure. Latif stated that he would not plead guilty to the accusations and his lawyers announced their intention to formally appeal the dismissal in court.
