= Mosque-Madrasa of al-Asifyah =

Mosque, Madrasa, Tomb, and Sufi Lodge in Baghdad, Iraq

Mosque-Madrasa of Al-Asifyah
- مدرسة الآصفية
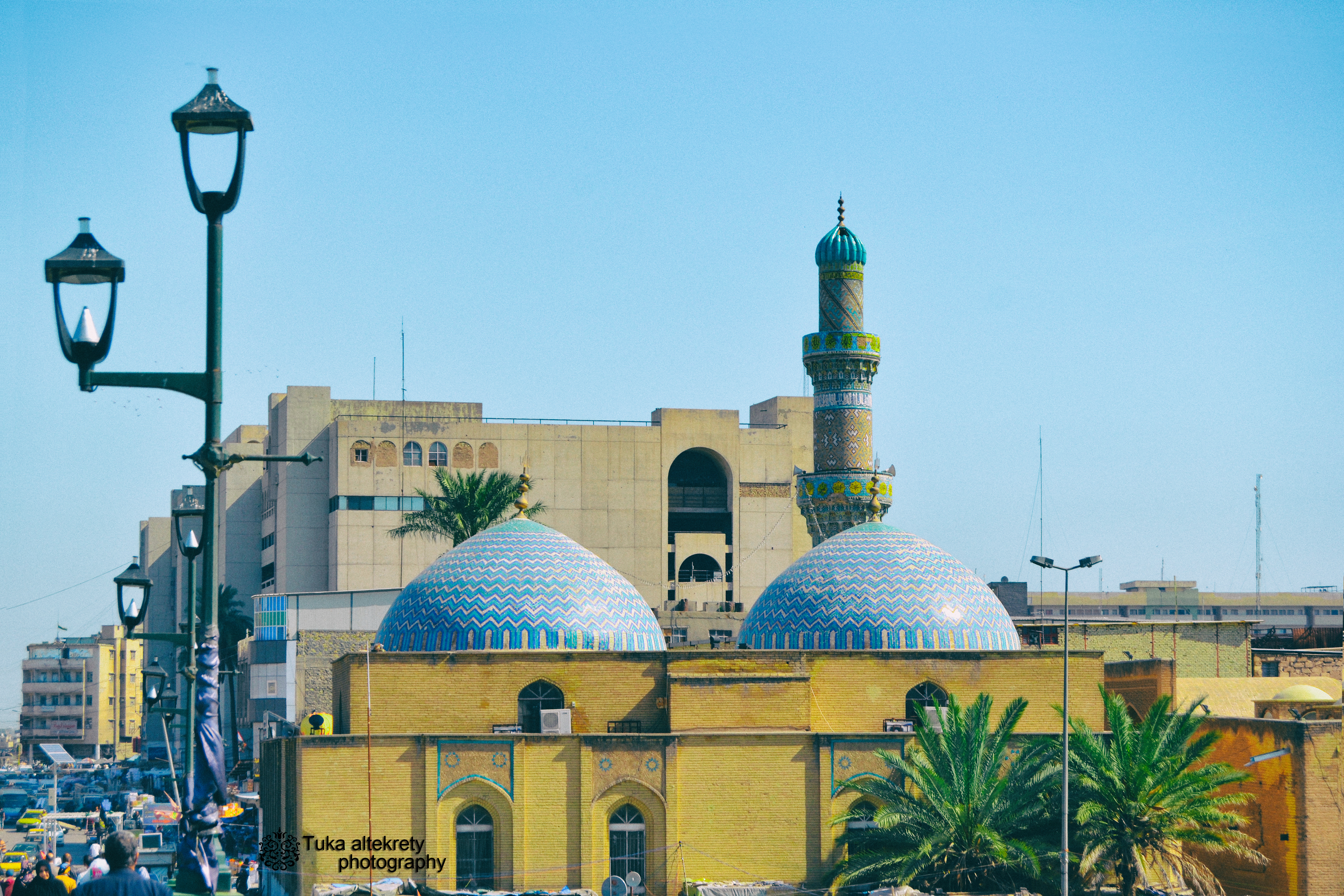
- The mosque in 2016

- Location of the mosque in Baghdad

Religion
- Affiliation: Sunni Islam
- Rite: Sufism (Also some Shi'ite services)
- Ecclesiastical or organizational status: Mosque and madrasa
- Status: Active

Location
- Location: Tigris riverbank, Baghdad, Baghdad Governorate
- Country: Iraq
- Interactive map of Mosque-Madrasa of Al-Asifyah
- Coordinates: 33°20′20″N 44°23′21″E

Architecture
- Type: Mosque architecture
- Style: Abbasid; Ottoman
- Founder: Dawud Pasha
- Completed: 1608 CE

Specifications
- Capacity: 500 worshipers
- Interior area: 400 m^{2} (4,300 sq ft)
- Dome: Two
- Minaret: Two
- Site area: 7.57 ha (18.7 acres)
- Shrine: One: (identity disputed)

The Mosque-Madrasa of al-Asifyah (Arabic: مدرسة الآصفية) is a Sufi mosque and madrasa complex, located near the riverbank of Tigris, in the city of Baghdad, in the Baghdad Governorate of Iraq. The mosque and its associated complex includes a madrasa, old courts, and other former government buildings, and a palace are contained within a 7.57-hectare (18.7-acre) site alongside the banks of the Tigris that forms part of a tentative UNESCO World Heritage Site list, adjacent to the al-Wazeer Mosque.

The mosque complex also includes a small shrine, which is believed to entomb the remains of Islamic scholar al-Kulayni. It could also contain the tomb of Islamic Sufi Imam al-Muhasibi.

== Etymology ==
The Arabic name of the complex (Arabic: الآصفية, romanized: al-Asifyah) is deprived from the laqab of Mamluk governor of Baghdad Dawud Pasha, the governor who renovated the complex. In Arabic, Dawud Pasha used to name himself as Arabic: آصف الزمان, romanized: Asif al-Zaman, lit. 'The Portrait of Time'.

== History ==
The way the tomb was built indicates that the shrine was originally supposed to be a tomb of one of the Abbasid Caliphs. As the area where the complex was built used to be a cemetery for Banu Abbas, as mentioned by some historians. It was uncommon for Abbasid caliphs to spend about ten thousand dinars on the building of a shrine similar to this one and people at that time never decorated graves sites in respect to the traditions of Muhammad, so it is possible that this was originally an Abbasid tomb. The mosque was one of the facilities and accessories of the madrasa, so it is possible that the builder of the aforementioned madrasa would be buried in it.

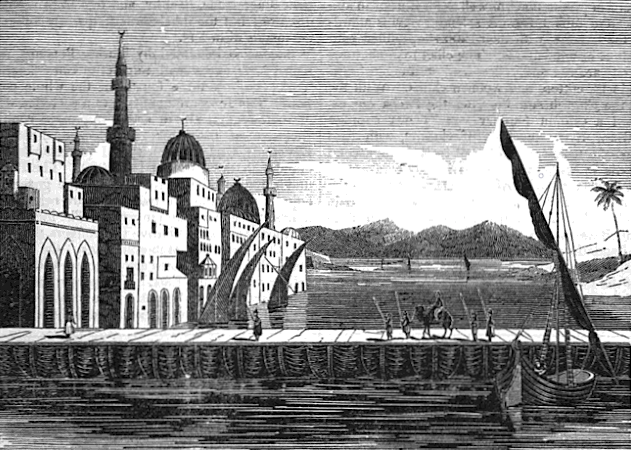
A depiction by a foreign traveler of the Tigris River as well as the al-Kat’a Bridge and the Madrasa from an American Magazine, 1834.

The complex originally consisted of a mosque, Sufi lodge named "Dar al-Qu'ran" and khan, and was called Mawla-Khana in lineage to Darwish Mawlai who established the two institutions. In 1590, the Sufi lodge was built by Cığalazade Yusuf Sinan Pasha, who ruled Baghdad from 1590 to 1594. The complex became the building ground for al-Asifyah Mosque much later. The madrasa, which existed before the Sufi lodge, was also considered a subordinate of al-Mustansiriya Madrasa, which was located next to it.

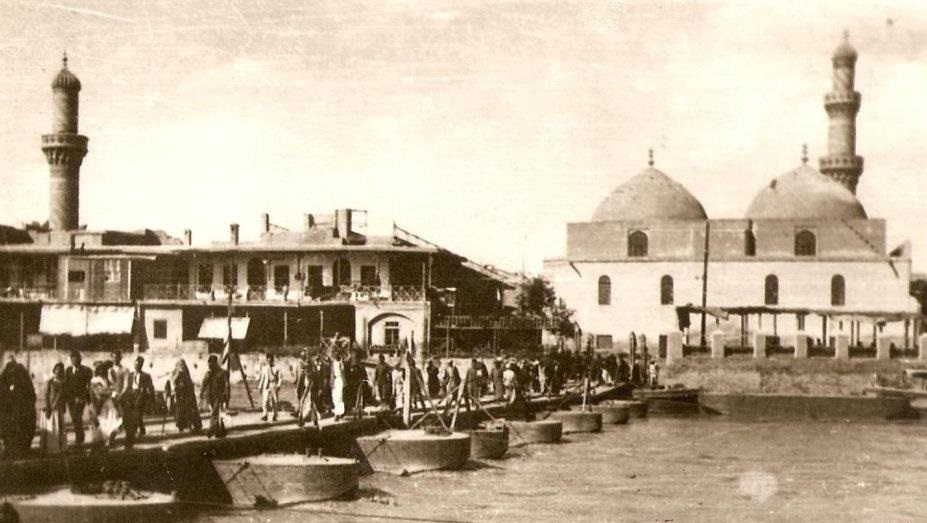
The Mosque in 1930 overlooking the al-Kat'a Bridge.

Later, the original building became eroded and was demolished. The complex was then taken over by one of the students of the lodge who belonged to the Sufi tariqa, until the building was renovated by Muhammad Jalabi Khatib al-Diwani in 1596. It then became the facility of al-Mustansiriyya Madrasa. In 1825, the building was renovated again by the ruler Mamluk of Baghdad Dawud Pasha in its current appearance. During the time, two madrasas were built for elementary and secondary levels, attached with preaching area and a minaret. He also reformed the mosque with larger prayer space, and erected two minarets to the south of the mosque made of stone and decorated with Qashani tiles. The buildings were engraved with the poetry by Sheikh Saleh al-Tamimi.

Among the sheikhs who taught in the complex was Sheikh Ali bin Hussein al-Kuti, who died in 1917, and the last teacher in the madrasa was Sheikh Abd el-Jalil bin Ahmed al-Jamil, who died in 1957. Teaching in the madrasa was canceled after his passing, and the archaeological library of the complex was transferred to the Public Endowments Library located in Bab al-Mu'atham in Baghdad.

== Architecture ==
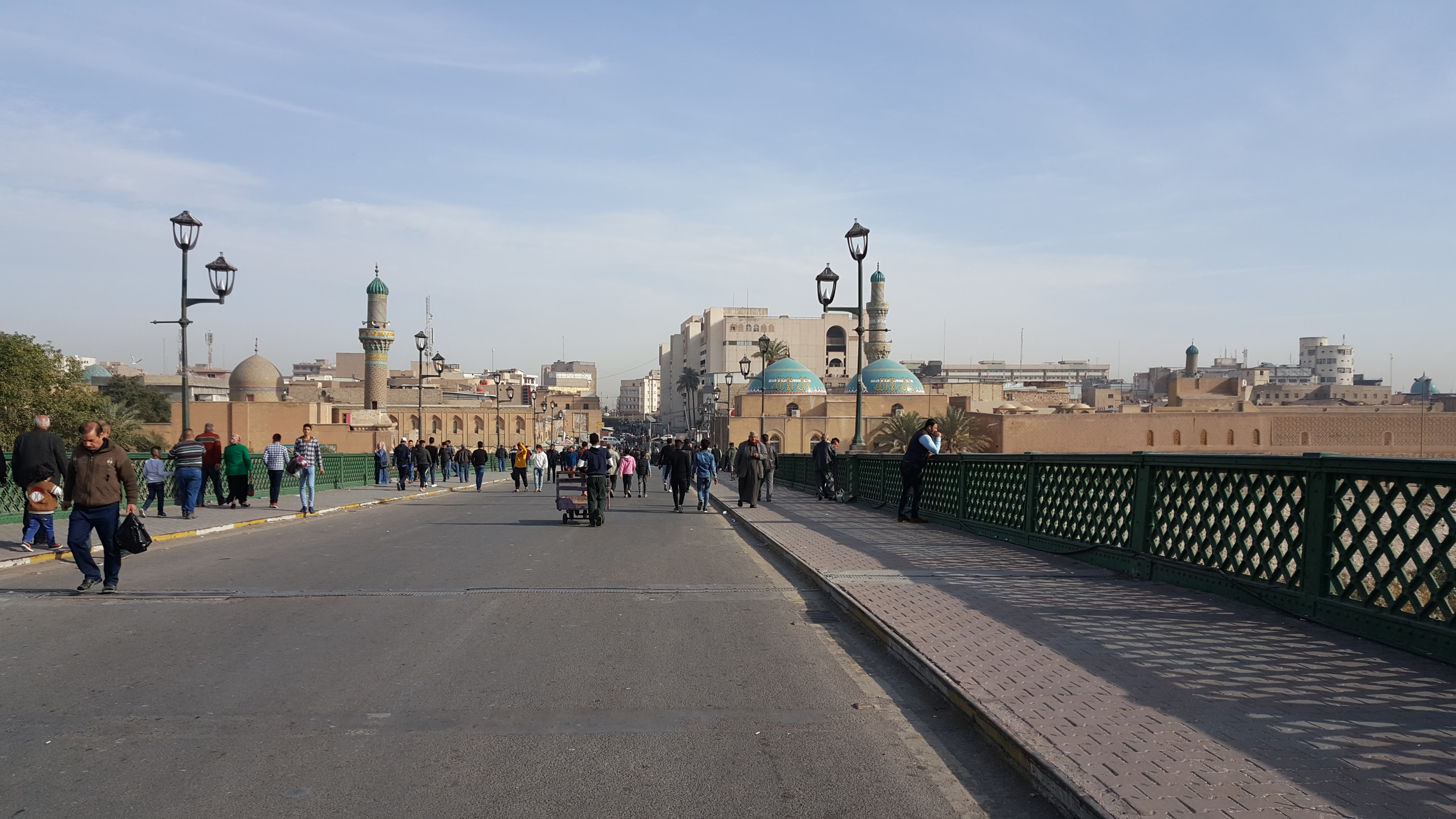
Al-Asifyah Complex as seen next to al-Wazeer Mosque

The minaret of the mosque is well known for having two balconies, each having muqarnas below them. The minaret is decorated with Qashani tiles and several decorations. Adjacent to the minaret are two large domes above the main prayer hall.

== Burials ==
- Muhammad ibn Ya'qub Ishaq Al-Kulayni, a notable Shi'ite Muslim scholar
- Al-Harith al-Muhasibi, a Sufi Muslim theologian, philosopher and ascetic

== See also ==
- Islam in Iraq
- List of mosques in Iraq
