= Al-Mustansiriya University =

Public university in Baghdad, Iraq

Coordinates: 33°20′19″N 44°23′23″E

Al-Mustansiriyah University
- الجامعة المستنصرية
- The main gate of Al-Mustansiriya University
- Motto: اقْرَأْ وَرَبُّكَ الْأَكْرَمُ (3) الَّذِي عَلَّمَ بِالْقَلَمِ (4) عَلَّمَ الْإِنْسَانَ مَا لَمْ يَعْلَمْ
- Motto in English: "Read! And your Lord is the Most Generous – Who taught by the pen – Taught man that which he knew not." (Surah Al-‘Alaq, 96:3–5)
- Type: Public University
- Established: 1227; 799 years ago 1963 (modern)
- Founder: Mustansir
- President: Prof. Dr. Hamid Tamimi
- Location: Baghdad, Iraq
- Website: www.uomustansiriyah.edu.iq

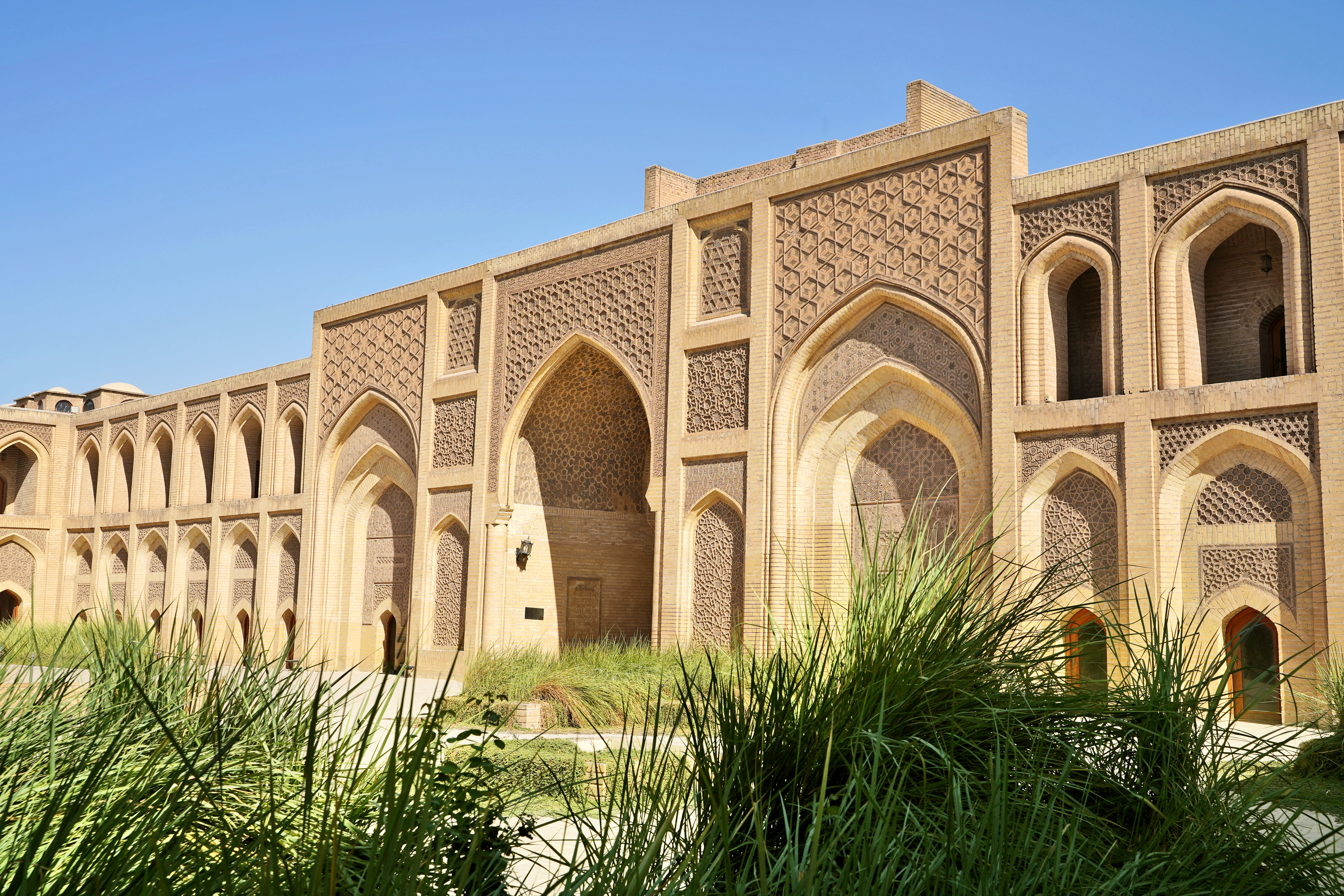
Al Mustansiriya Madrasah main door.

Al-Mustansiriya University (Arabic: الجامعة المستنصرية, romanized: al-Jāmiʿa al-Mustanṣariyya) is a public university located in Baghdad, Iraq. It traces its origin back to 1227. The modern form of the university was founded in 1963.

== History ==
The original Mustansiriya Madrasah was established in 1227 (or 1232/34 A.D. by some accounts) by the Abbasid Caliph Al-Mustansir and was one of the oldest universities in the world. Its building, on the left bank of the Tigris River, survived the Mongol invasion of 1258 and has been restored.

The modern Mustansiriyah University was established with the help and financial support of the Republic of Ίrāq Teachers' Union in 1963, mainly providing evening courses. In 1964, the university was given the status of a semi-state institution and some state financial support. At the same time it absorbed Al-Shahab University, another private university that had been founded by the Ίrāqi Association of Economists, and then moved to a new campus to the north of the city center. Initially, the university also managed colleges in Mosul and Basra.

In 1966 a law was passed under which the private universities were converted into public universities. Mustansiriyah thus became, briefly, a college within the University of Baghdad. In 1967 a major reorganization of higher education was initiated, with the intention that by 1969 all previous institutions would be abolished and reconstituted. Mustansiriyah was designated as a separate University in 1968, and its branch campuses were detached to form part of the University of Mosul and the University of Basra.

== Colleges ==
- College of Medicine: Based outside the main campus, attached to Al-Yarmouk Teaching Hospital and the National Center of Hematology. It is one of four medical schools in Baghdad and the second to be established (after the University of Baghdad's College of Medicine).
- College of Dentistry: The second in Baghdad (after the University of Baghdad's College of Dentistry). Established by Dr. Ahmad M. Ismail. Based outside the main campus, attached to Al-Karama Teaching Hospital.
- College of Law
- College of Management and Economy
- College of Arts
- College of Education
- College of Science
- College of Physical Education
- College of Engineering
- College of Pharmacy
- College of Political Science
- College of Basic Education
- College of Touristic Sciences

== Notable alumni ==
- Kasim Muhammad Taqi al-Sahlani, a member of the Council of Representatives of Iraq
- Rahim AlHaj, an oud player and composer
- Nadhmi Auchi, a businessman and billionaire
- Alia Mamdouh, a novelist, author and journalist
- Betool Khedairi, novelist/author
- Abdullatif Ahmad Mustafa, Kurdish Salafi cleric
- Bashar M. Nema, Professor of Information security

== See also ==
- List of Islamic educational institutions
- List of universities in Iraq
