= Al-Muradiyya Mosque =

16th-century mosque in Baghdad, Iraq

- جامع المرادية
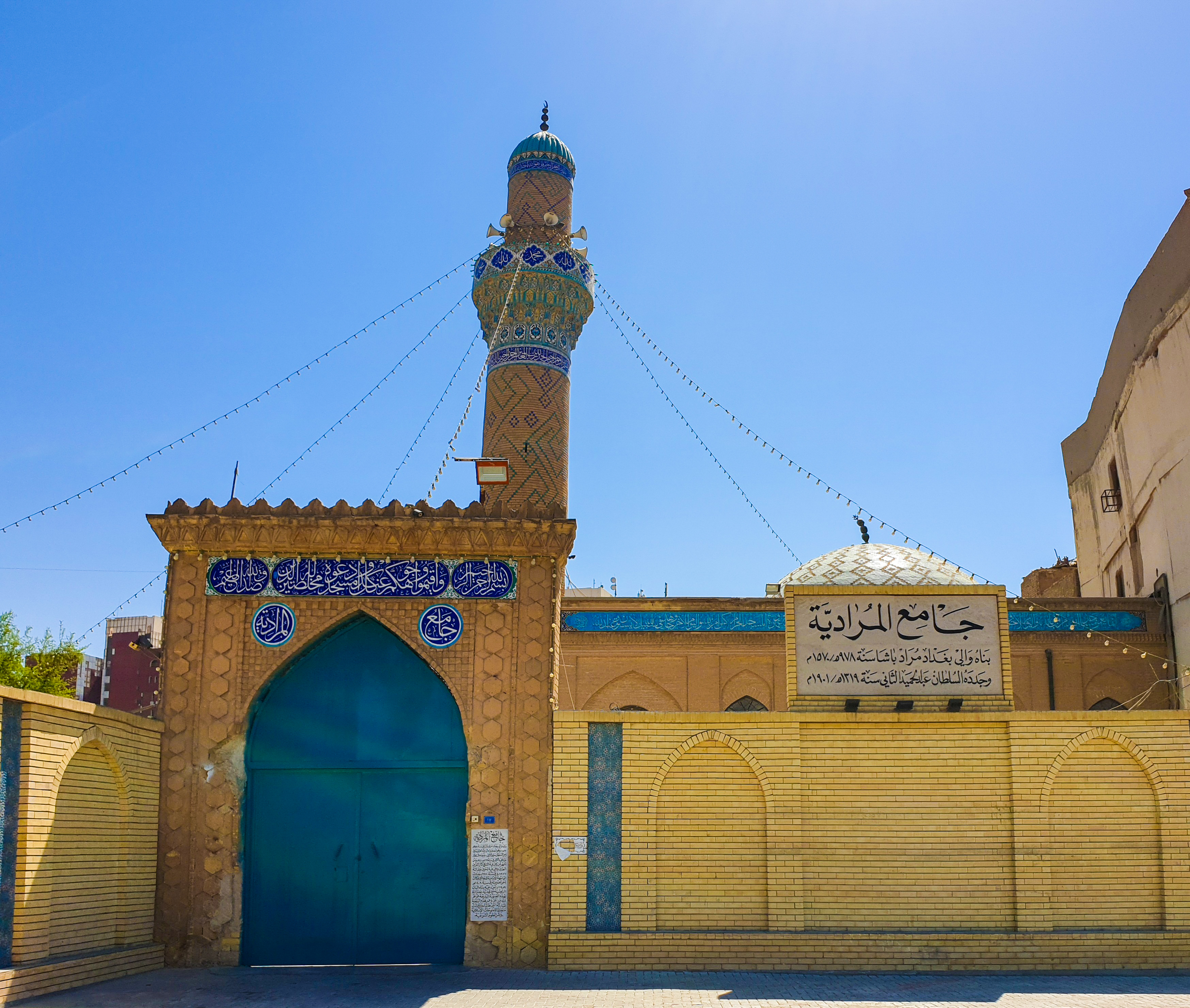
- The mosque in 2020

- Location of the mosque in Baghdad

Religion
- Affiliation: Islam
- Ecclesiastical or organisational status: Mosque
- Status: Active

Location
- Location: al-Rusufa, Baghdad, Baghdad Governorate
- Country: Iraq
- Interactive map of Al-Muradiyya Mosque
- Coordinates: 33°20′43″N 44°23′06″E

Architecture
- Type: Mosque architecture
- Style: Abbasid (minaret); Ottoman (mosque)
- Founder: Murad Pasha
- Completed: 1570 CE

Specifications
- Interior area: 1,125 m^{2} (12,110 sq ft)
- Dome: Seven
- Minaret: One
- Materials: Bricks; plaster

The Al-Muradiyya Mosque (Arabic: جامع المرادية), also known as Murad Pasha Mosque (Arabic: جامع مراد باشا, romanized: Jami' Murad Basha), is a mosque located in the al-Rusufa district of Baghdad, in the Baghdad Governorate of Iraq. The mosque is situated in al-Maidan Square opposite the Ministry of Defense and an old citadel between al-Ahmadiyya Mosque and the Uzbek Mosque.

The mosque dates from the early Ottoman period. The minaret of the mosque is believed by some to be the most beautiful minaret in Baghdad.

== History ==
The mosque's construction began in 1566 by Murad Pasha of the Ottoman Empire who was governor of Baghdad at that time. It was completed in 1570 and was named "al-Muradiyya" after Murad Pasha. A celebration was held on its opening date. In 1686, Governor Ahmed Pasha Albu Shanaq renovated the khan attached to the mosque and added a water pipe for the services of the mosque. It was last renovated in 1903 and still stands today. The Mosque has been a source of pride for the people of Baghdad due to its architecture and decorations.

The mosque is considered a heritage and was restored in 2009 at a time when most religious buildings in Baghdad were suffering from neglect.

== Description ==
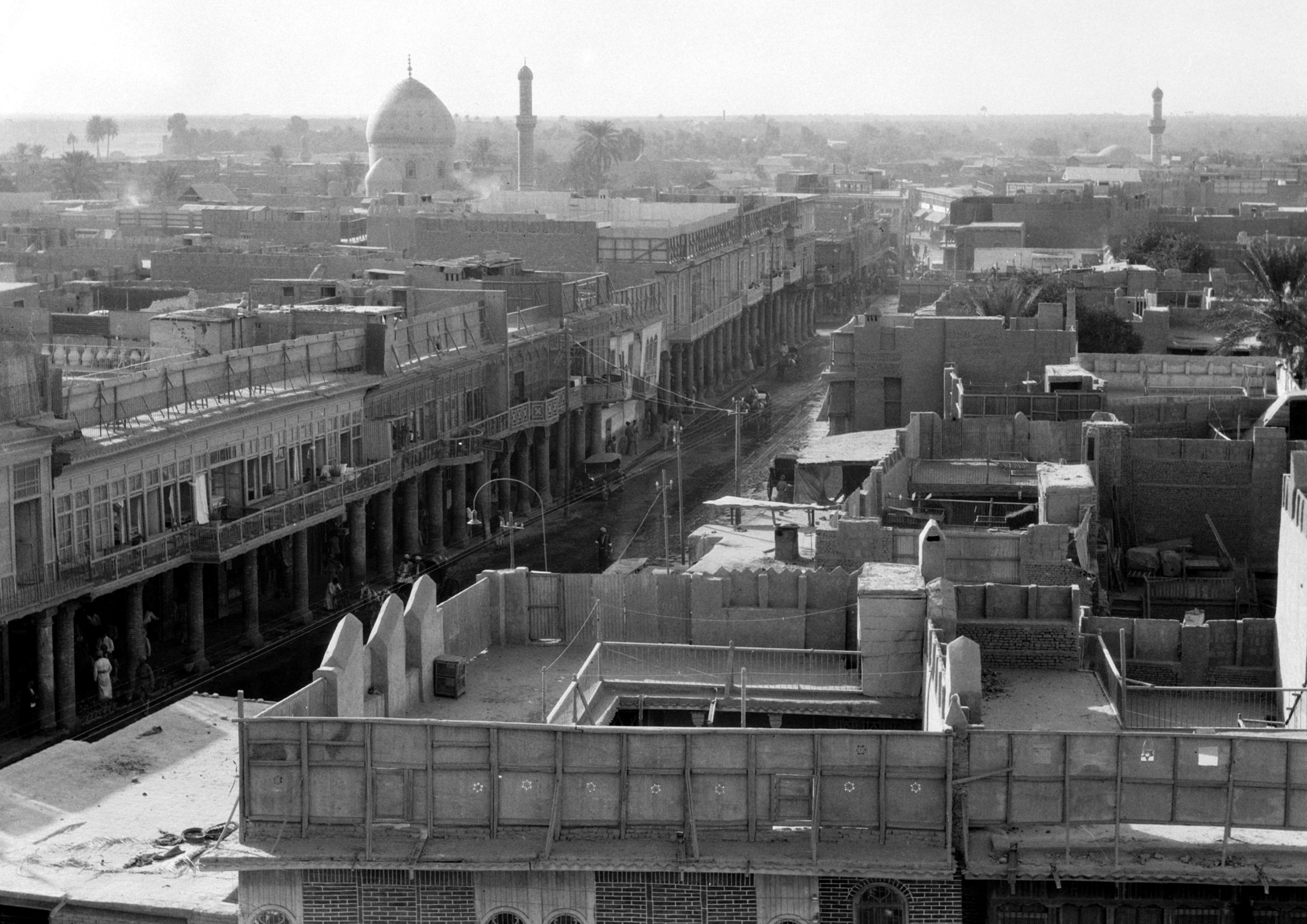
Al-Muradiyya Mosque (right) in 1932.

The mosque is built on extensive land with bricks and plaster and it is 1,125 square metres (12,110 sq ft) in area. Its chapel is rectangular in shape with its walls being thick and the mihrab being 10 metres (33 ft) high. The building is surmounted by seven domes resting on four cylindrical columns of marble which are connected by pointed arches. The biggest of these domes is the central one which is above the chapel and is hemispherical and flattened in shape. The inside of the dome is decorated with Qur'anic verses that revolve around its neck while the outside of the dome is decorated with blue and green faience. The six other domes are smaller in size. The mosque's dome is usually nicknamed "The Chinese Dome" due to the edge of its periphery serrated in a shape similar to the serrated edge of Chinese architecture. Located on the northwest corner of the summer chapel is the minaret which is also decorated. The inside includes a spiral staircase that leads to the basin which rests on a row of muqarnas topped by a ribbed bulbous. The minaret is a traditional Baghdadi minaret that was built in Abbasid style without Ottoman influence.

== See also ==
- Islam in Iraq
- List of mosques in Baghdad
