= Sheikh Ma'ruf Cemetery =

Old cemetery in Baghdad, Iraq

- مقبرة الشيخ معروف
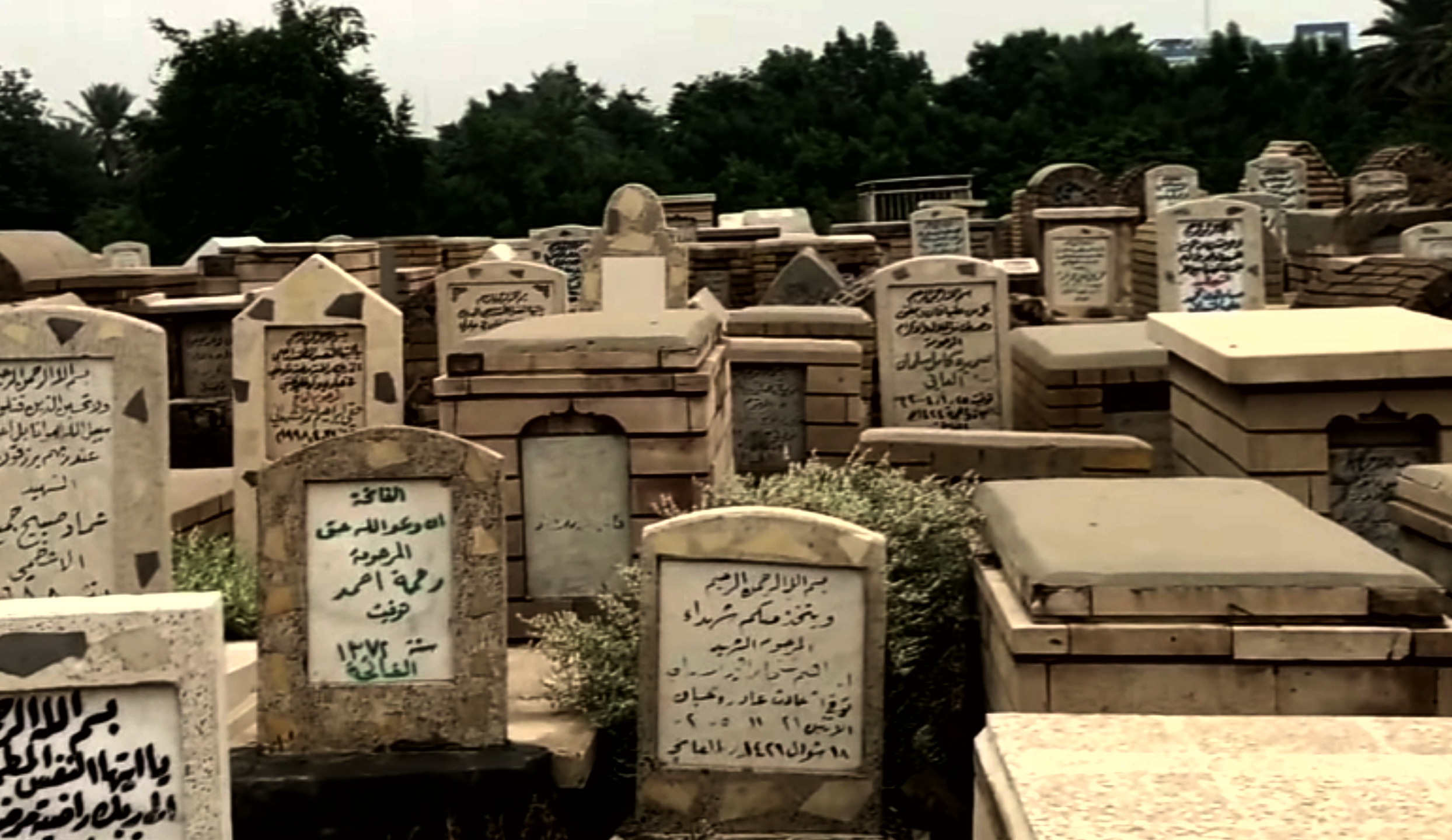
- A view of the cemetery in 2019

- Location within Iraq

General information
- Type: cemetery
- Location: Karkh, Baghdad, Iraq
- Coordinates: 33.3344130°N 44.3746859°E

Design and construction
- Known for: Containing the Sheikh Ma'ruf Mosque and several other prominent monuments dedicated to religious figures and Muslim royals

Sheikh Ma'ruf Cemetery (Arabic: مقبرة الشيخ معروف), also known as Maqbarat Shuniziyyah, is a historic cemetery located in the neighborhood of Karkh in Baghdad, Iraq. The cemetery's name is derived from Ma'ruf al-Karkhi, a Sufi mystic who is buried in here. Several historic mausoleums are present in the cemetery, such as the Zumurrud Khatun Mosque and Mausoleum.

== Main sights ==
=== Sheikh Ma'ruf Mosque ===
The Sheikh Ma'ruf Mosque was built around the grave of the renowned ascetic Ma'ruf al-Karkhi between the years 1215 to 1216. In 1225, the Abbasid Caliph al-Nasir renovated the mosque. In the Ottoman era, the mosque was restored and refurbished twice, first by the governor Ahmed Pasha and later on Ahmed Pasha. In 2001, the mosque was fully reconstructed in a modern, futurist style, which also doubled the area of the mosque and replaced the old minaret with a new one.

The mosque has a large prayer hall. A room at the end of the prayer hall contains the tomb of Ma'ruf Karkhi, while some rooms at the sides of the prayer hall serve as private mausoleums for the Suwaidi and Qashtini families.

=== Zumurrud Khatun's mausoleum ===
The mausoleum of Zumurrud Khatun was first built in 1202 by Sayyida Zumurrud Khatun herself. It was later developed into a mosque, known as the Haza'ir Mosque. The mosque has two prayer halls, one for the Hanafi school of thought and the other for the Shafi'i school. The mausoleum sports a tall muqarnas conical dome and fine brickwork.

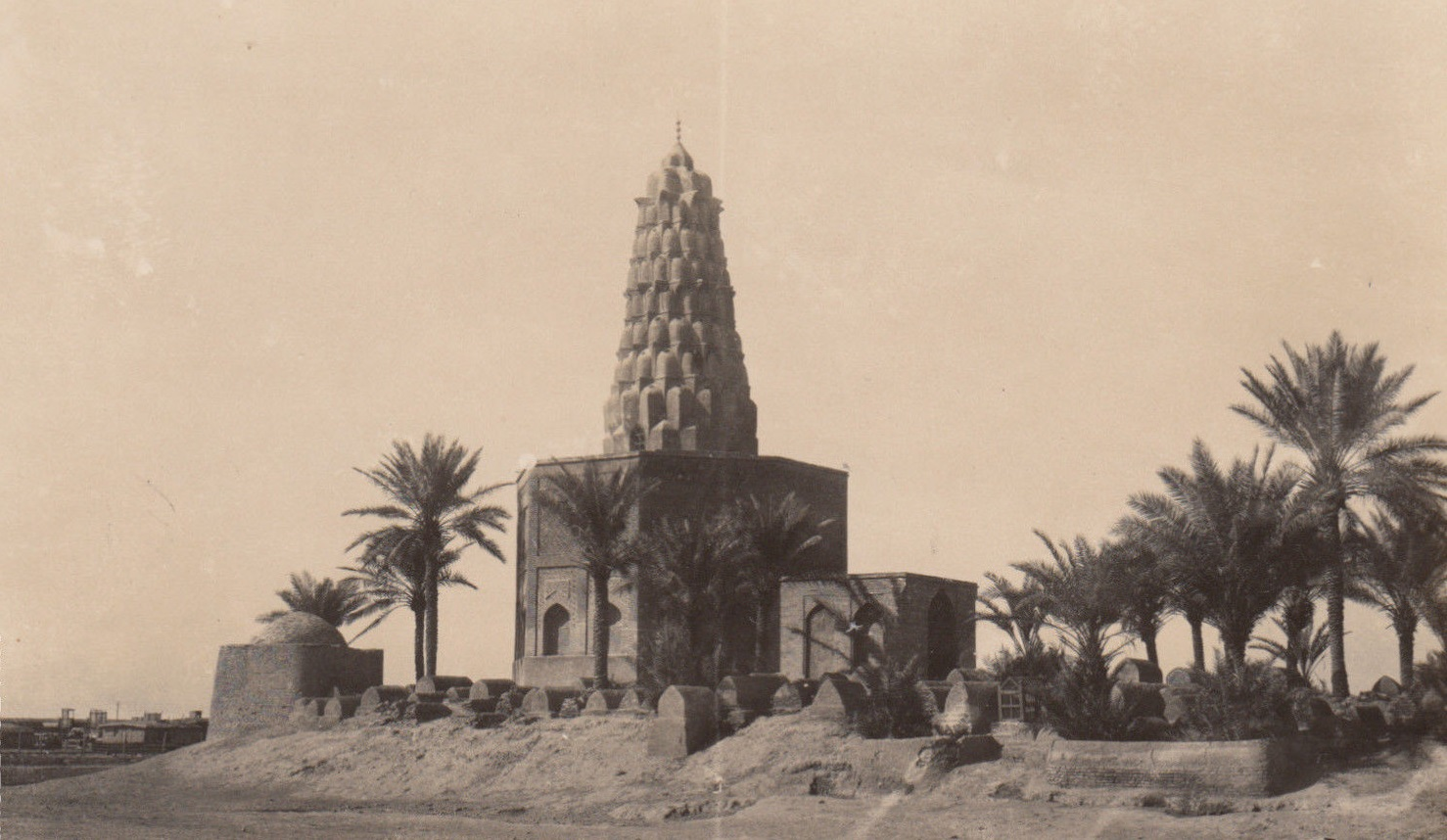
Picture from 1930s

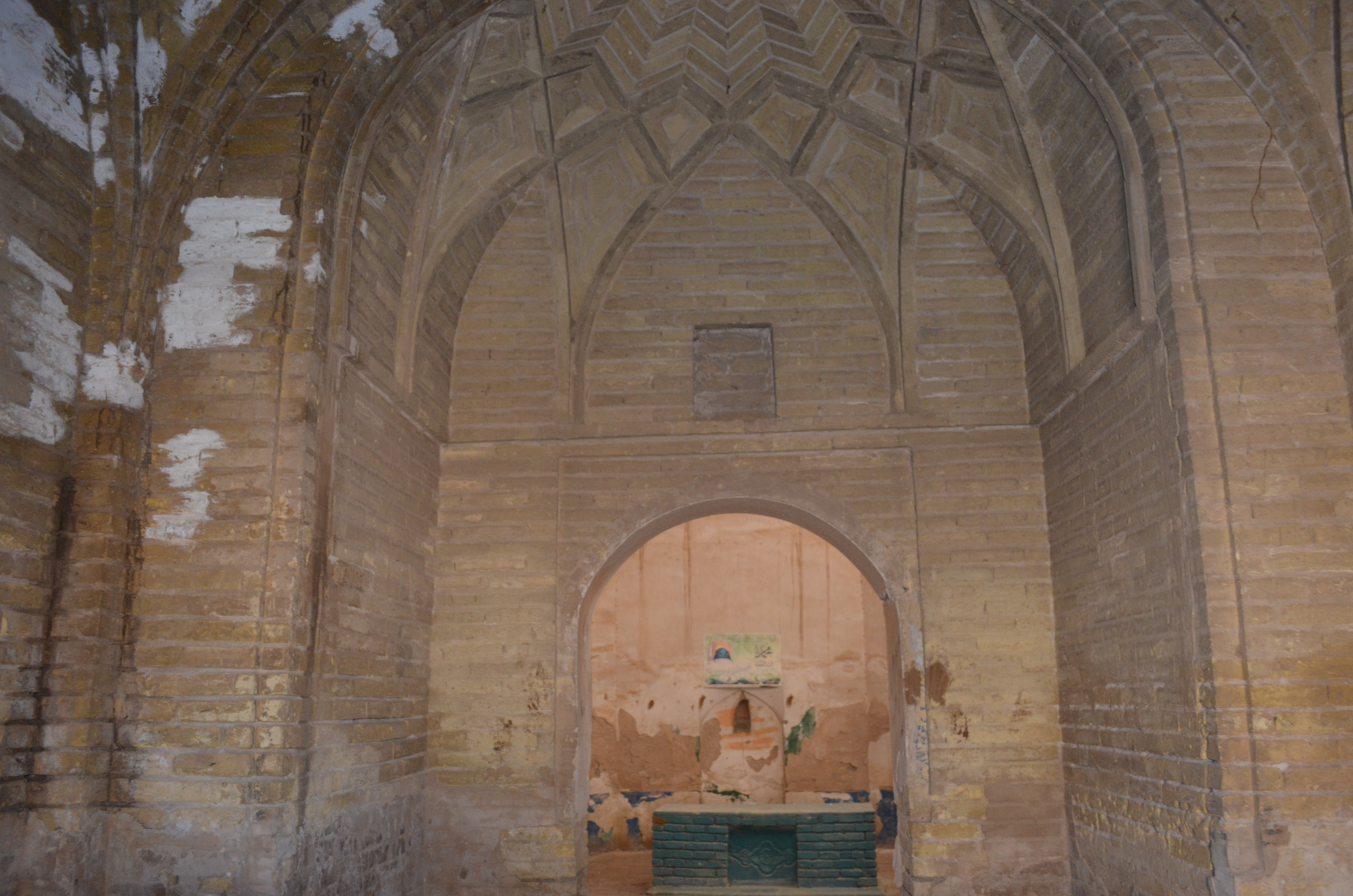
Inside the mausoleum, with the tomb of Zumurrud Khatun visible

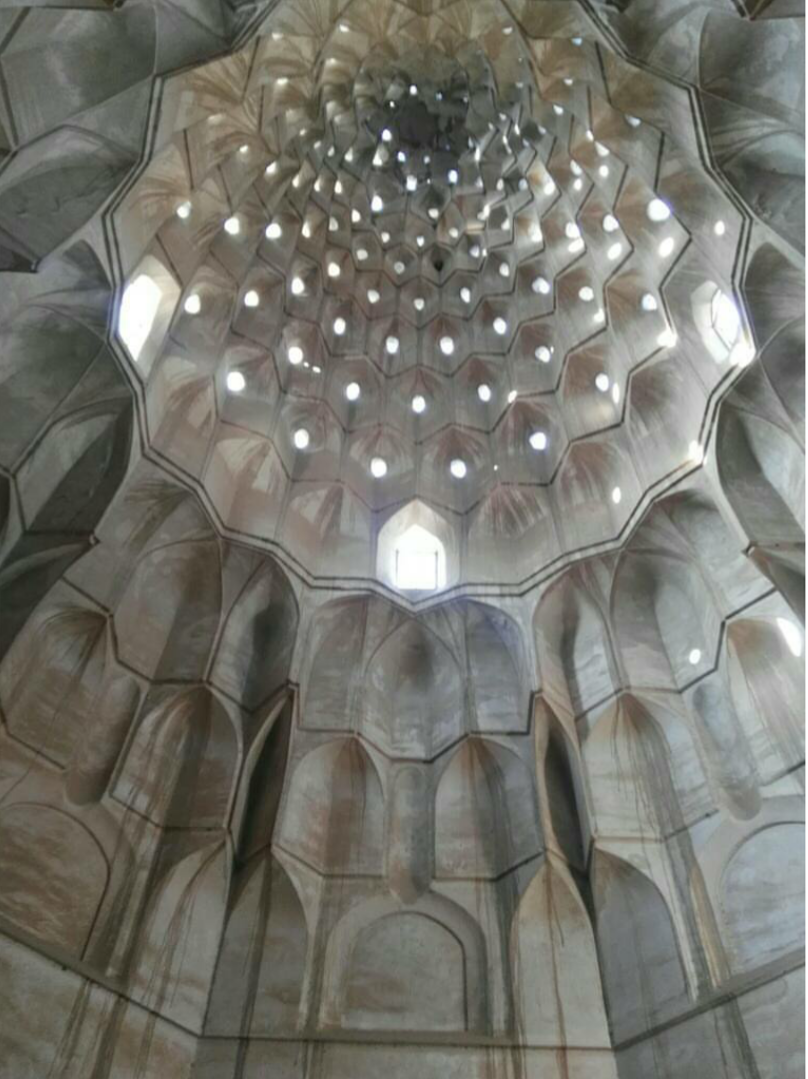
Muqarnas inside the conical dome.

=== Tomb of Bahlool ===
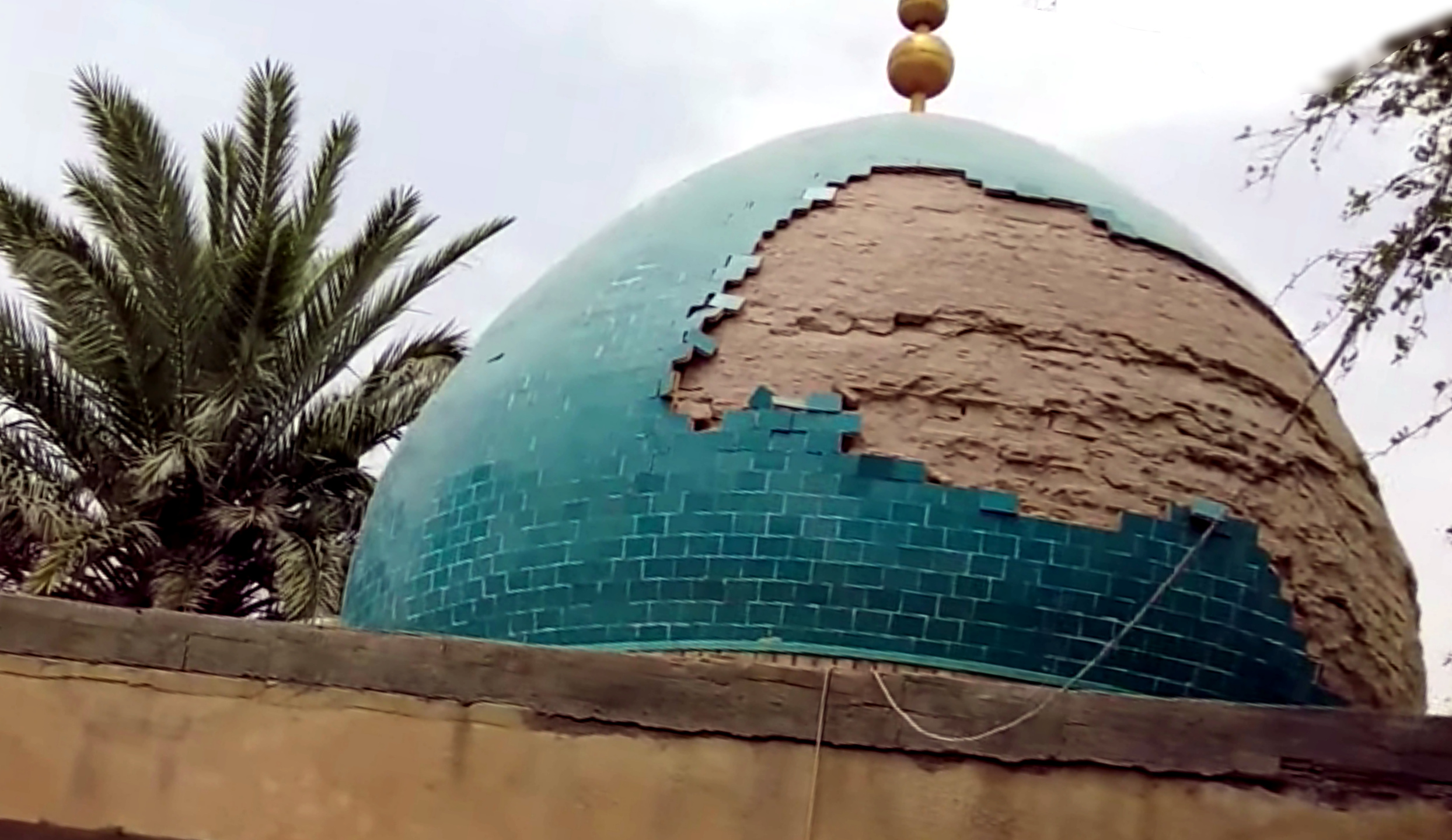
The dome over Bahlool's tomb

Bahlool, real name Wahhab ibn 'Amr, was a former qadi during the Abbasid Caliphate who served the Caliph Harun al-Rashid. He eventually became insane so that he would be excused from signing an approval to execute his friend Musa al-Kadhim. Bahlool was buried in this cemetery, and a shrine was built for him during the Ottoman rule in 1893.

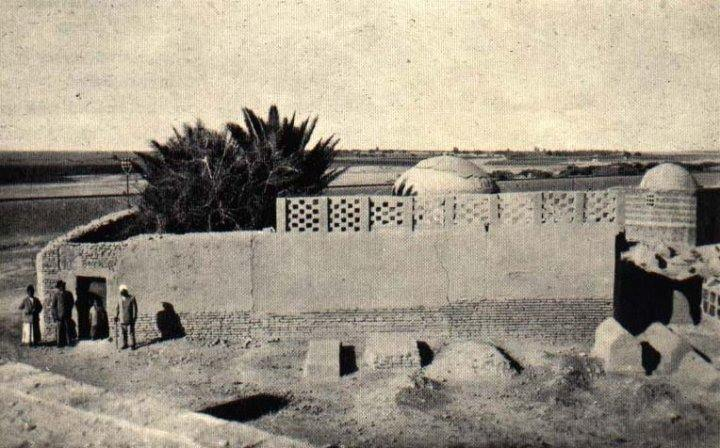
The Baba Nanak Shrine in the 1920s

In the courtyard of Bahlool's tomb is a small gurdwara for the Sikh community, known as the Baba Nanak Shrine. It dates back to at least 1511, and it is believed that Guru Nanak visited Baghdad in the same year. The shrine was damaged in 2003, during the Iraq War.

=== Tomb of Sheikh Mashi'uh ===
Sayyid Abdullah al-Assaf al-Ithawi, nicknamed Sheikh Mashi'uh by his followers, was a Sufi mystic who followed the Rifa'i and Qadiri Sufi orders. He was buried in 1835.

== Controversy ==
In 2023, an order was made from the Iraqi government to exhume some of the bodies and transfer them to a different cemetery, as a highway would be built passing through the territory of the cemetery. This would be done to reduce traffic congestion. The decision was met with outrage amongst locals, despite a fatwa from the local clerics that approved of the exhumation and transfer of the deceased. Around late 2023, locals of Karkh gathered outside the cemetery and protested against the exhumation.

Despite these protests, the government eventually decided to build a bridge which passed over the cemetery anyway. The families of the deceased were told to bury their dead in a different location without offering financial assistance, which is estimated in the million in Iraqi currency, or specifying an alternative to the grave sites. This decision caused widespread criticisms, demonstrations, and outrage throughout Baghdad, including residents of old Karkh, towards the government of Muhammad Shi'a al-Sudani. The decision was compared to previous constructions around cemeteries in Baghdad during the era of former president Saddam Hussein, such as the expansion of the Sheikh Ma'ruf Mosque in which barely any grave was exhumed or moved.

== Notable burials ==
- Aisha Khatun (d. 18th century) the mother of Ahmed Pasha the governor of Baghdad under the Ottoman Empire
- Mahmud al-Alusi (1802–1854) Hanafi scholar and author of Ruh al-Ma'ani
- Rashid Hassan al-Kurdi (1882–1954) Preacher and Salafist theologian
- Abdul Karim Zaidan (1917–2014) Former minister of state for Waqf Affairs

== See also ==
- Qarafa necropolis
- Takht-e Foulad Cemetery
