= Mosque-Madrasa of al-Ahmadiyya =

Sunni mosque and madrasa in Baghdad, Iraq

- جامع ومدرسة الأحمدية
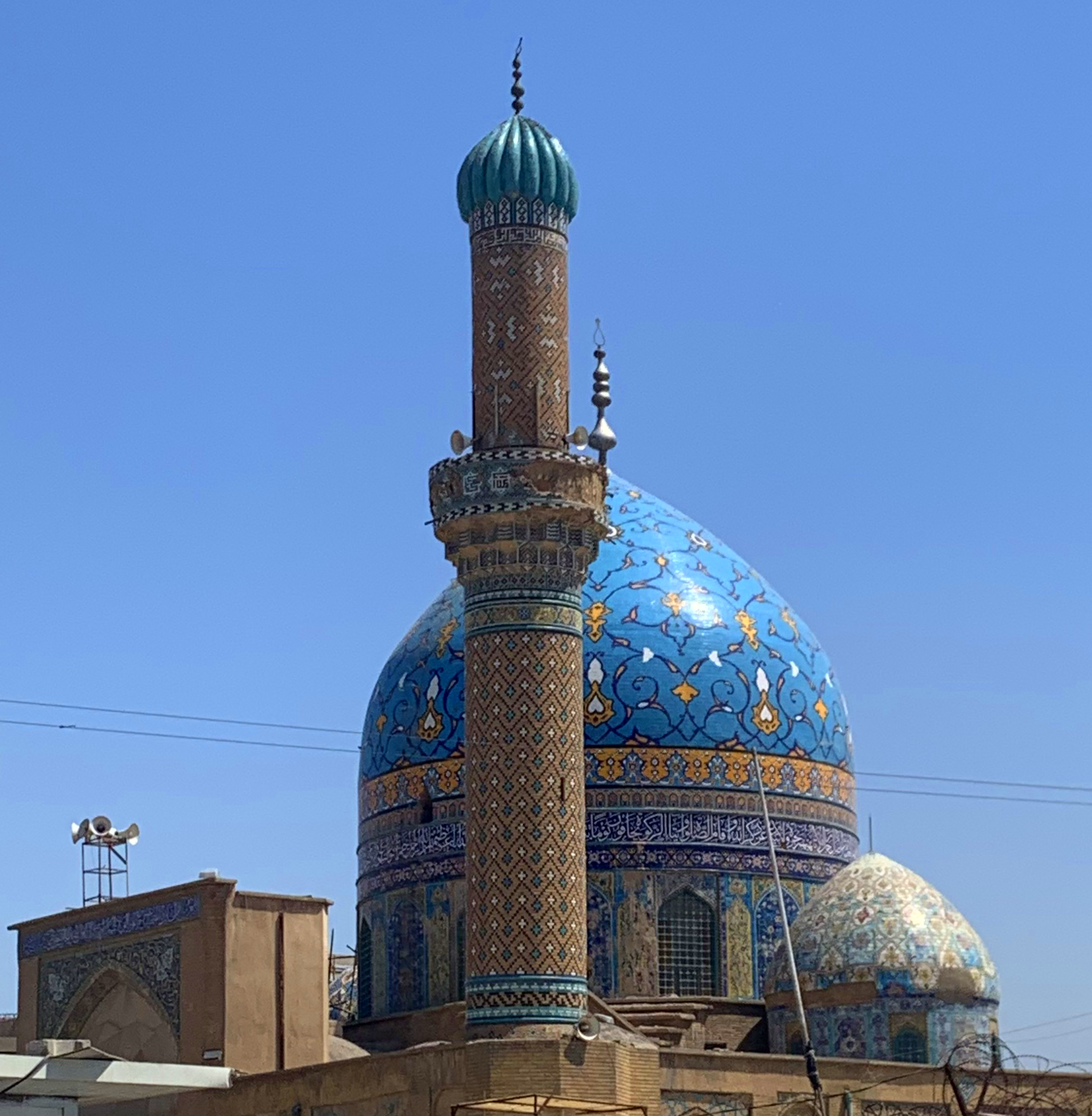
- The mosque domes and minaret in 2023

- Location of the mosque in Baghdad

Religion
- Affiliation: Sunni Islam
- Ecclesiastical or organizational status: Mosque; Madrasa
- Status: Active

Location
- Location: al-Rusafa, Baghdad, Baghdad Governorate
- Country: Iraq
- Interactive map of Mosque-Madrasa of al-Ahmadiyya
- Coordinates: 33°20′37″N 44°23′09″E

Architecture
- Style: Islamic architecture
- Creator: Ahmad al-Katkhadha
- Completed: 1796

Specifications
- Dome: Two (maybe more)
- Dome dia. (outer): 11 m (36 ft)
- Minaret: One
- Site area: 2,600 m^{2} (28,000 sq ft)

The Mosque-Madrasa of al-Ahmadiyya (Arabic: جامع ومدرسة الأحمدية), commonly known as the al-Ahmadiyya Mosque (Arabic: جامع الأحمدية) or as the al-Maidan Mosque (Arabic: جامع الميدان), is a Sunni mosque and madrasa, located in the al-Rusafa district of Baghdad, in the Baghdad Governorate of Iraq. The mosque is situated on al-Rashid Street in the southern part of al-Rusafa, and the east of al-Maidan Square, near al-Muradiyya Mosque.

== History ==
=== Construction ===
The mosque was built in 1796 in al-Maidan by Ahmad al-Katkhadha, the vice of the Mamluk ruler Sulayman the Great. The mosque also get its name "Al-Ahmadiyya" in relation to Ahmad Katkhadha. Ahmad Katkhadha reportedly summoned the best engineers and architects of his time to build the mosque as well as spending many money on the construction effort. After the death of Ahmad Katkhadha, his brother, Abdullah Beu, continued the work. The minaret was later added by his brother along with the madrasa. The mosque is also close to al-Khulafa Mosque, the mosque dating from the Abbasid era.

=== Later events ===
Not long after its construction, the mosque-madrasa was visited by James Silk Buckingham during his visit to Baghdad in 1816. Buckingham described it as having a "handsome dome and minaret" and was amazed by its colored tiles and faience but was disappointed to find out that the inside wasn't special outside of being clean and well lighted.

The complex has undergone many events, including the renewal of the writings and inscriptions on the façade of the building by the last Mamluk ruler Dawud Pasha in the year 1831. During the reign of Grand Vizier Midhat Pasha, the Madrasa rooms were demolished and its floor was added to the public street. The building of the prayer house was renewed in the year 1893 based on an inscription written on the neck of the dome of the mihrab court. Many well-known scholars in Baghdad have studied in its madrasa, including Shari'a judge and astronomy writer Yahya al-Watri, a member of the famous al-Watri family who would later teach in it and later establish a scientific assembly in al-Khulafa Mosque called "al-Watri Council." His son, Mahmoud al-Watri, also studied in the madrasa.

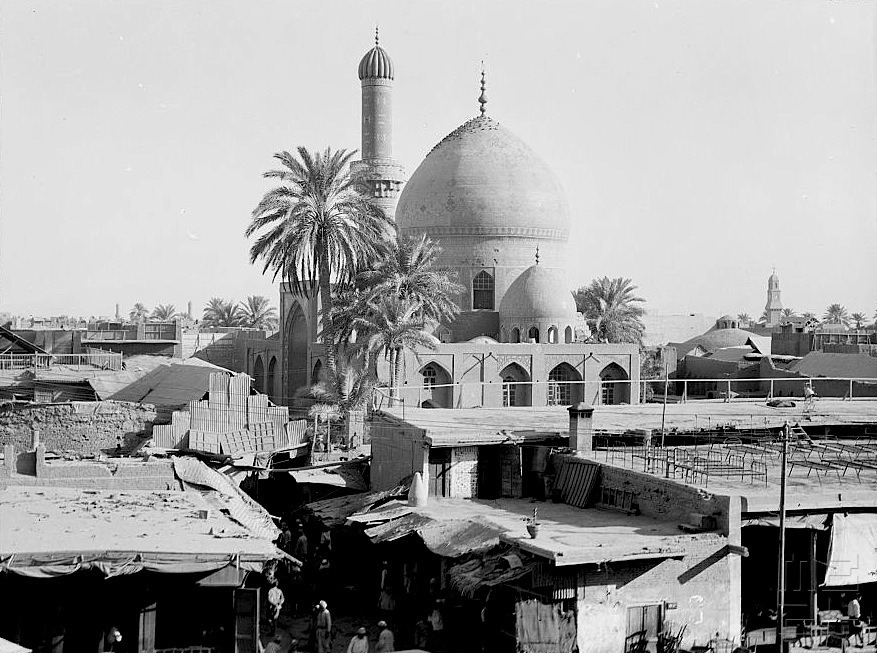
The Mosque-Madrasa in 1932.

When the Kingdom of Iraq gained independence, King Faisal I ordered that the mosque be allocated for Friday prayers only.

The mosque was restored in 2010 before holding the conference for the cabinet of the Sunni Endowment Office.

In 2019, the dome of the Mosque-Madrasa of al-Ahmadiyya collapsed as a result of the continued rain, groundwater, and neglect similar to many buildings around Baghdad that have been suffering due to political theft, neglect, and political differences and tensions. That same year, the Sunni Endowment Office launched a campaign to restore and rehabilitee the Mosque-Madrasa of al-Ahmadiyya along with the Murjan Mosque, al-Muradiyya Mosque, and the Uzbek Mosque after their heritage importance was recognized. Reconstruction on the mosque-madrasa later began in the same year. The mosque remains open to the public but entrance is only open during prayer times.

== Architecture ==
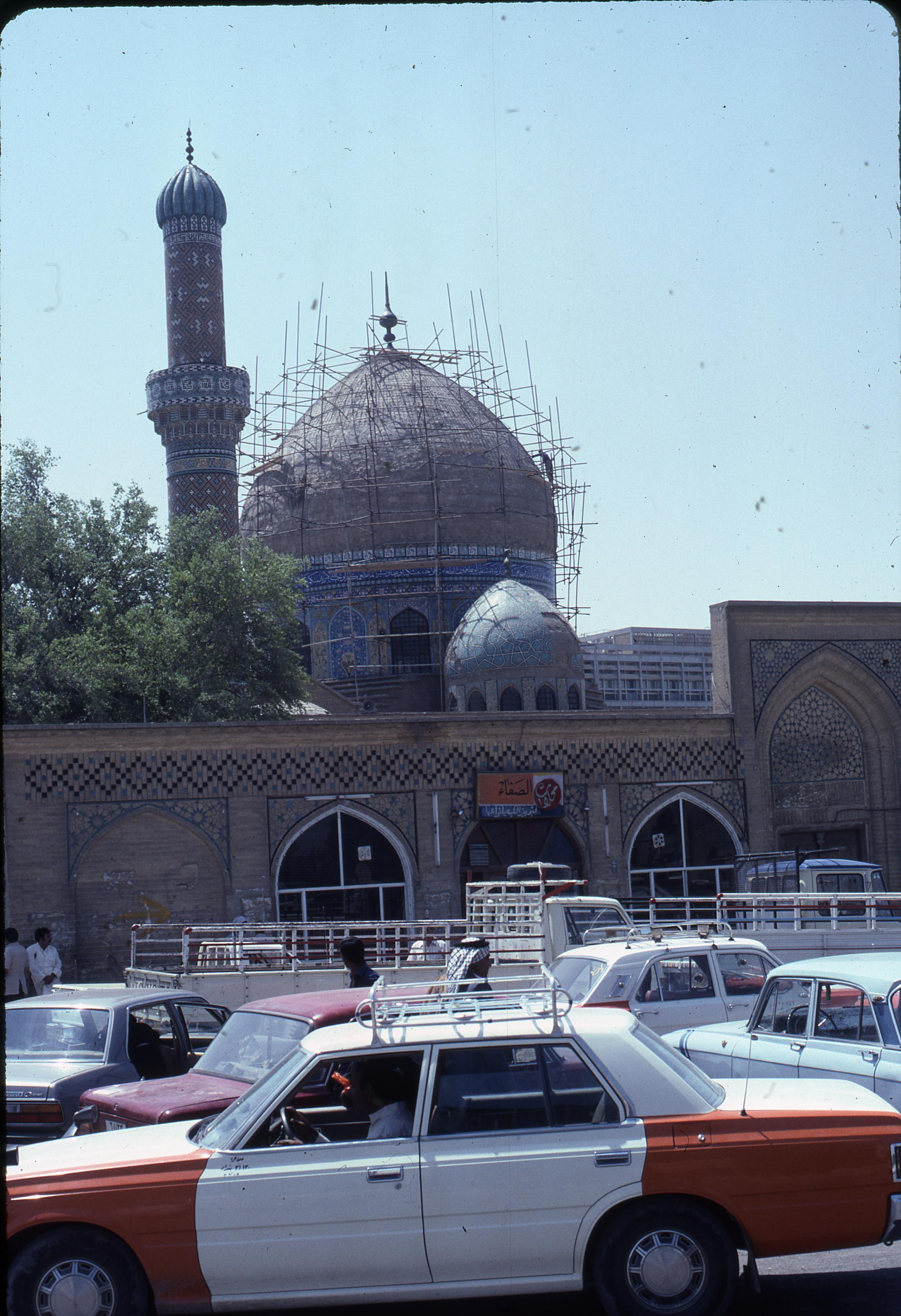
Renovations on the mosque complex in 1982

The Mosque-Madrasa of al-Ahmadiyya is composed of two complexes, the first is the main mosque with domes and on the southern side of it is the second building which is a two floored complex that contains the madrasa. Between the two buildings is a courtyard; it is surrounded by high walls that contain four gates leading to its surroundings. On the right side of the courtyard is a summer mihrab with muqarnas. The building has an area of approximately 2,600 square metres (28,000 sq ft). Inside the mosque, there is a wide musalla in front of the corridor. On the left side, there is a prayer space for summer, which is topped by a tall dome made of Qashani tiles and has a diameter of 11 metres (36 ft). A minaret is situated on the south of the dome. The wall of the mosque is painted with inscriptions of the Qur'anic verses, which were written by the calligrapher Sufyan al-Wahbi in 1850 who is buried in the mosque's yard.

The Mosque-Madrasa of al-Ahmadiyya is distinguished by its dome and its length which is divided into three bands. The middle of it opened with windows, some of which were windowed and some of which were not. Above the neck is a dome, of the type of double domes. The inner dome was made low with a hemispherical shape, while the inner dome was made with a bulbous shape, and the latter was characterized by their massiveness. Due to the climate of Baghdad, the walls of the mosque-madrasa are 2.5 metres (8 ft 2 in) thick; similar to the walls of the Haydar-Khana Mosque.

The high minaret contains multi-colored faience work. It sits on an octagonal base, although this base is only seen from the western view of the mosque. The minaret contains geometric shapes with a ribbed dome top.

== See also ==
- Islam in Iraq
- List of mosques in Baghdad
