= Al-Mufassal fi 'Ahkam al-Mar'ah wa Bayt al-Muslim fi al-Shari'at al-Islamiyyah =

Islamic book regarding women's rights

al-Mufassal fi 'Ahkam al-Mar'ah wa Bayt al-Muslim fi al-Shari'at al-Islamiyyah
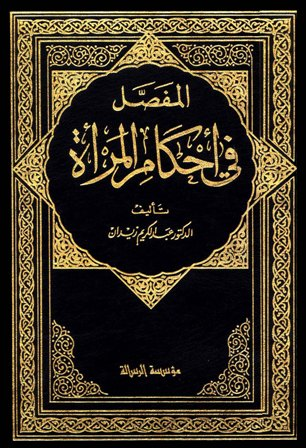
- Hardcover copy from Mu'assasah al-Risalah, 1997
- Author: Abdul Karim Zaidan
- Language: Arabic
- Genre: Women's rights
- Publisher: Mu'assasah al-Risalah
- Publication place: Iraq (published in Lebanon)

al-Mufassal fi 'Ahkam al-Mar'ah wa Bayt al-Muslim fi al-Shari'at al-Islamiyyah (Arabic: المفصل في أحكام المرأة والبيت المسلم في الشريعة الإسلامية) is a treatise written by Abdul Karim Zaidan, which concerns the topic of Women in Islam as well as issues relating to family. First published in Beirut, Lebanon, the book is divided in eleven volumes.

== Publication history ==
al-Mufassal fi 'Ahkam al-Mar'ah wa Bayt al-Muslim fi al-Shari'at al-Islamiyyah was published between 1993 and 1997 by the Mu'assasah al-Risalah publishing house in Beirut, Lebanon. It took twelve years, between 1979 and 1991 for Abdul Karim Zaidan to complete writing his treatise.

== Content ==
The treatise is split into eleven volumes which discuss topics including prayer, prohibitions, justice, finances and rulings which apply to a family. In the book, Abdul Karim Zaidan takes a stand against both feminism and gender inequality, while summarizing how women have an extremely important role in Islam. The author includes Hadith and opinions from all the four schools of Islamic thought to support his views with evidence. Each volume of the treatise was written with detailed explanations, so that the reader would not need to own all eleven volumes.

== Awards ==
The book has won the following awards:

- Iran's Book of the Year World Award (1994)
- King Faisal Prize (1997)

== See also ==
- Abdul Karim Zaidan
- List of Sunni books
