= Al-Maidan Square =

Historic square in Baghdad, Iraq

Coordinates: 33.3443°N 44.3852°E

Al-Maidan Square ساحة الميدان
- Locality
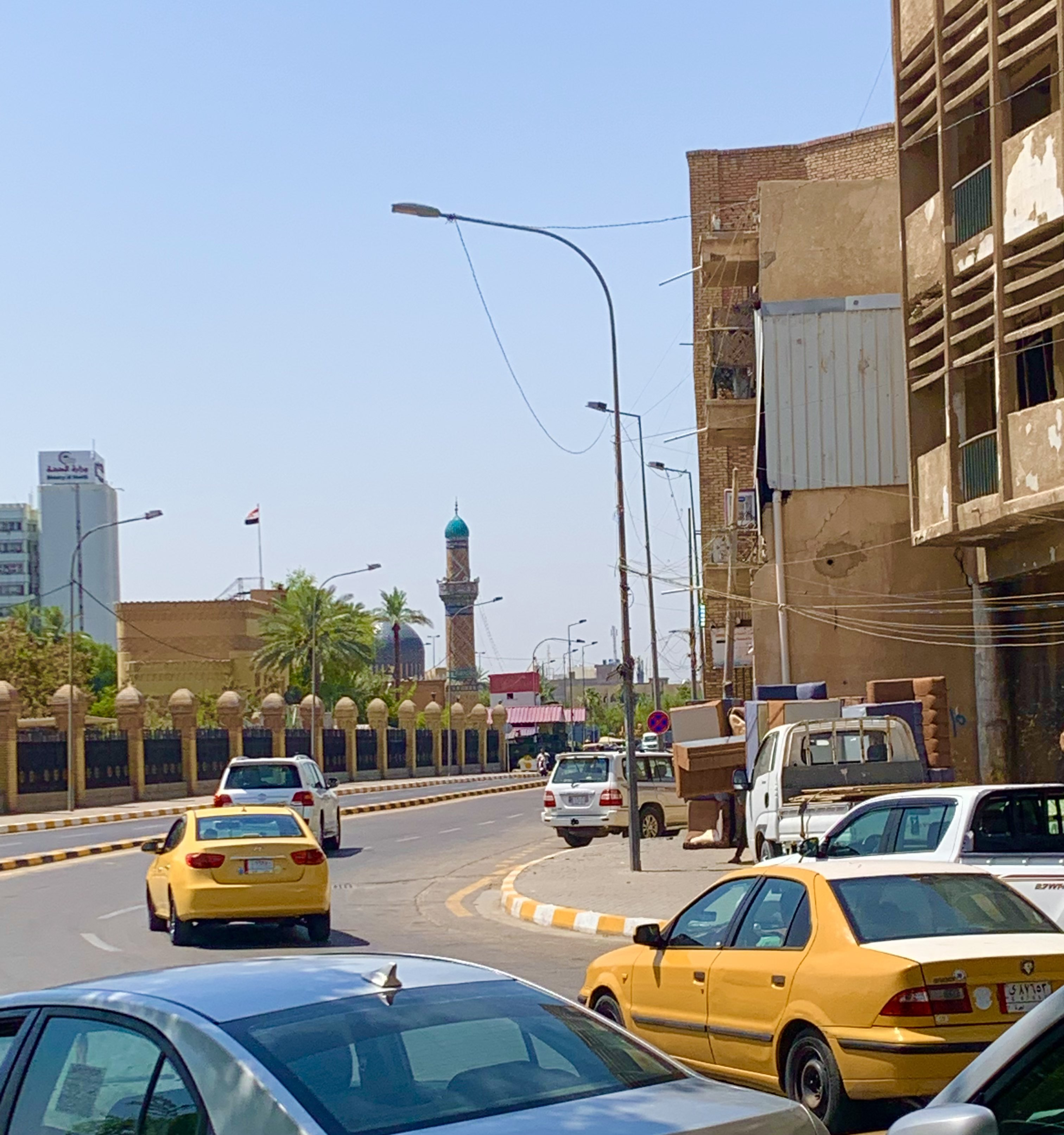
- The left side of al-Maidan Square that includes the Uzbek Mosque
- Interactive map of Al-Maidan Square
- Country: Iraq
- City: Baghdad
- Time zone: UTC+3

Al-Maidan Square (Arabic: ساحة الميدان), also known as just al-Maidan, is an old locality and area located in the al-Rusafa district in Baghdad, Iraq, that begins from Bab al-Mu'adham to al-Rashid Street. The square includes many buildings, markets, departments, government headquarters and neighborhoods where officials such as former Iraqi prime ministers Nuri al-Said and Ja'far al-Askari lived. Confined between al-Rashid Street and al-Jumhuriya Street, al-Maidan Square is considered one of the most prominent landmarks of Baghdad.

== History ==
=== Previous uses throughout the centuries ===
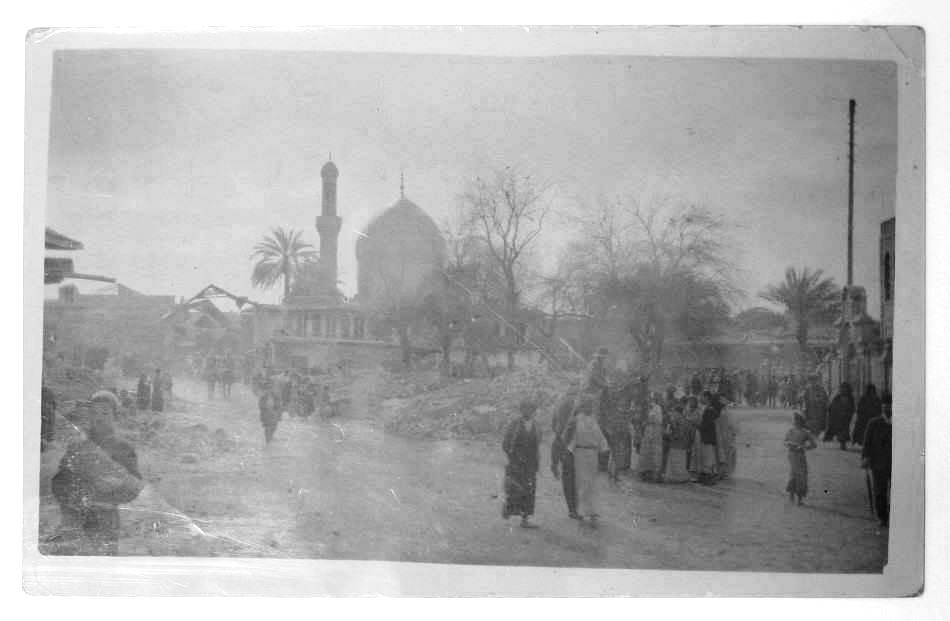
Al-Maidan Square in the late 1910s.

The name "al-Maidan" ultimately comes from the Persian word maydān meaning "square", and is cognate with the English words middle, median. During the Abbasid Caliphate, the area was a quarter surrounded by palaces that belonged to Abbasid caliphs and officials that were used for entertainment purposes.

Under Ottoman rule, the area was also used as a military training base for Ottoman soldiers who rested in the Qushla. The square was transformed from the place of the morning training of the Ottoman army to become a place for selling hay and barley to owners of horse-drawn carriages, and on Fridays the square turns into a place where Mamluks coming from the countries of Russia, the Caucasus, Armenia and Central Asia are sold. Executions were also held in the square. In the 19th century, the area became a square full of filth and dogs and other animals wandered. People flocked to the area to sell their merchandise in gatherings. However, Ottoman vizier Mehmed Selim Pasha ordered that the area to be cleaned up and for plants to be planted. As a result, for a while the area became a garden with aromatic plants and flowers.

British traveler and journalist James Silk Buckingham had visited Baghdad during Ramadan in the early 19th century and described al-Maiden in his second volume of "Travels in Mesopotamia", he noted that "the place of the Maidan never failed to be crowded every night, with people of all classes; and every mode of diversion in use here, singing, dancing and music, with blazing fires, lamps, etc. were called in, to add to the effect of the general rejoicing." Buckingham had also visited the main mosque of al-Maidan which was the Mosque-Madrasa of al-Ahmadiyya and described it as having a "handsome dome and minaret" and was amazed by its colored tiles and paintings but was disappointed to finding that the inside wasn't special outside of being clean and well lighted.

=== After Iraq's independence (20th century) ===
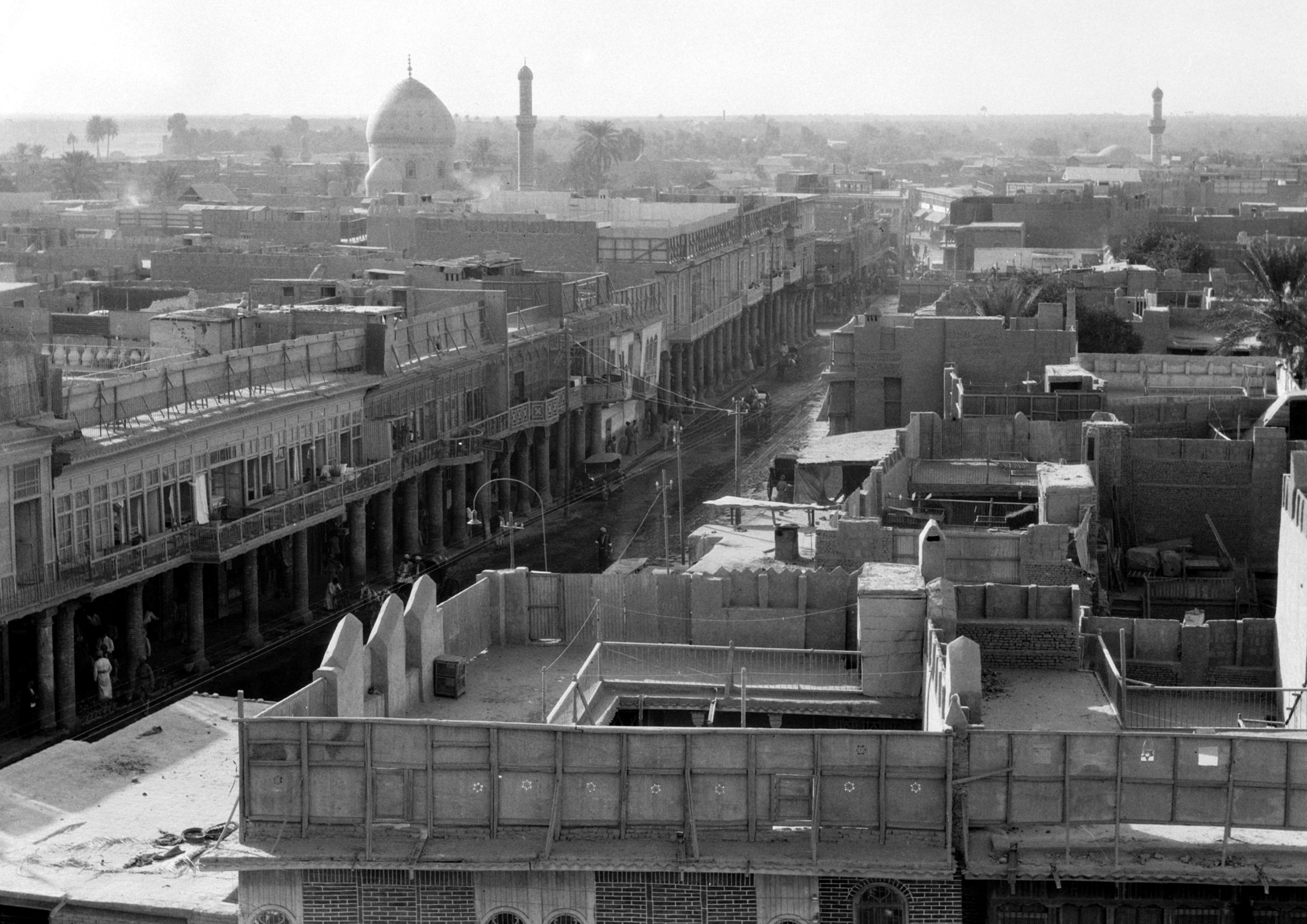
Al-Maidan Square as seen in the distance from al-Rasheed Street, 1932.

In the early 20th century, part of the square was taken to be built into a nightclub. There was also a famous hotel in the square, the Crescent Hotel, where Umm Kulthum famously sang during her visit in 1932. It is said that due to the small space of its hall, people in the square rented seats to listen to the lady's singing after he had the hotel owners set up loudspeakers. The area has also become significant for the first sparks of demonstrations, coups, and sit-ins, in addition to its corridors, which were a focus for secret meetings and the beginning of national political activities against various regimes. The area was also full of shops that Iraqis and foreign tourists often visited and shopped from.

Al-Maidan Square is also famous for being the main garage area for the red double-decker buses that were iconic in Iraq and were a unique feature for the country. The first batch of red buses entered Iraq at the end of 1951 after demands for public transportation grew, consisting of 100 buses, and began operating in the streets of Baghdad. In the same year, another group of 20 double-decker buses arrived. Since that time, Baghdadis have become accustomed to these buses, which are distinguished by their red color, and which operate on regular lines and schedules. The red buses were nicknamed "secretariats" by Iraqis and materialized a spirit of competition between Baghdad and London when it came to public transportation. These buses were distinguished by their punctuality and low costs.

During the 1980s, plans to develop an underground subway in Baghdad were in development. The plan included building one of the station underneath the square in which an underground stairway would lead into the station and would've been near a private parking lot. The plan was inspired by the idea that European railway stations were located next to public transportation area but the plan was never implemented due to the ongoing Iran-Iraq War and then the US-led embargo on the country. As a result, the Square remained a public bus parking lot.

== Overview and notable establishments ==
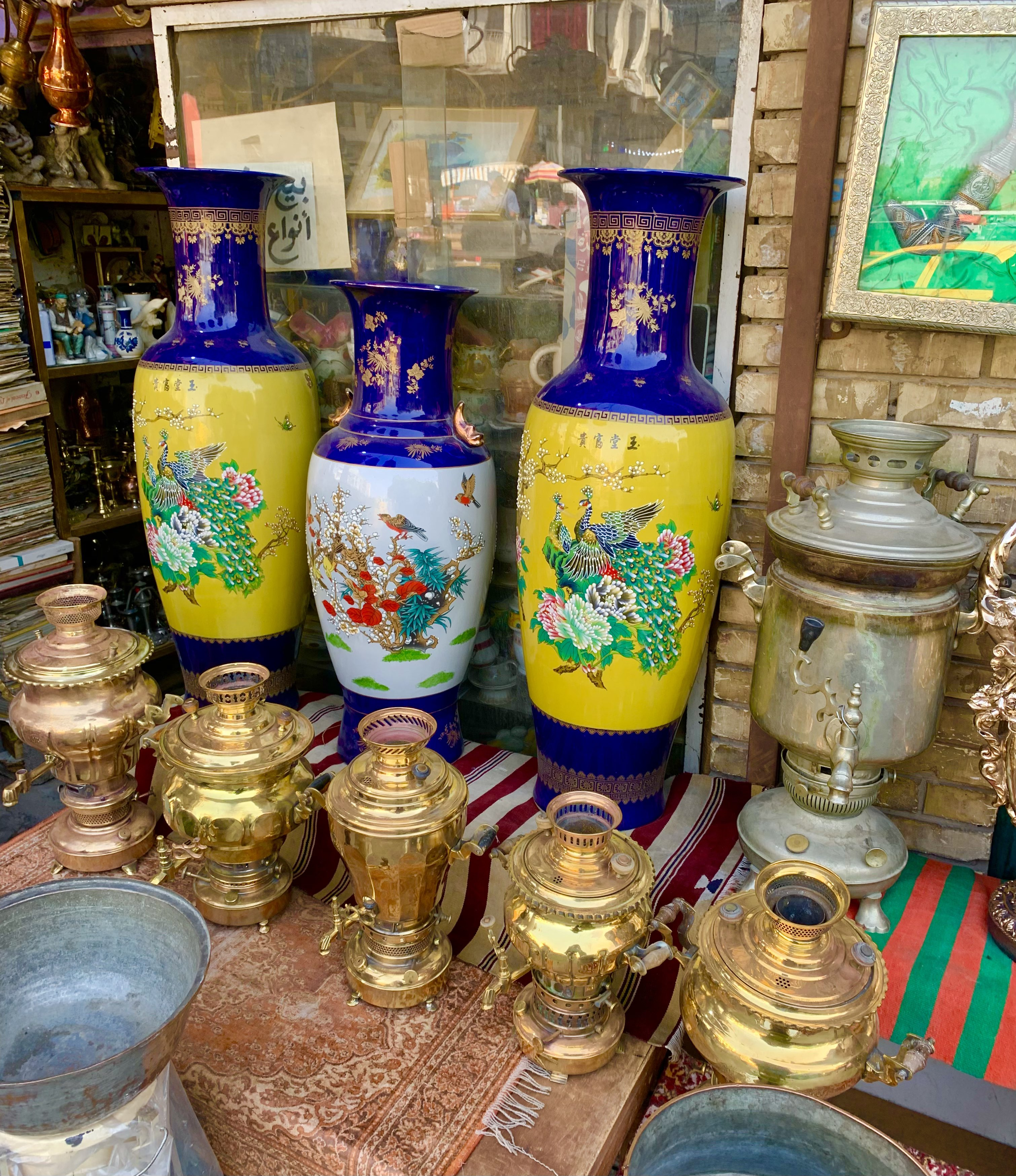
Antiques, including Chinese pots and samovars, as seen in Souk al-Haraj located in al-Maidan Square.

There are many notable establishments in al-Maidan Square that exists to this day due to the popular commercial activities in the area. One of these is al-Sayyid's Cakes which was famous for selling pastries, especially cakes, since 1907. In front of al-Sayyid's Cakes is Hajj Zabala Juice famous for selling raisin syrup, which dates back to 1900. Among the landmarks is the Sulaymaniyya Mosque, one of the mosques in Baghdad located in al-Maidan Square that holds both Eid and Friday prayers.

=== Armenian Orthodox Church ===
Also known as the Miskinta Church is one of the oldest churches in Baghdad. The Armenian community in Baghdad dates back to the 17th century when many Armenians emigrated from Isfahan and Persian Azerbaijan to Iraq due to persecution after the death of Shah Abbas I. The Armenians built the Church in 1640 on land given to them by the Ottoman Sultan Murad IV with Nestorian Christians helping in the construction. The Church was further reconstructed in 1957. Currently, the Church is located within a complex of buildings surrounded by high defensive walls. The single-nave church has a rectangular floor plan, vaults with four barrel roofs running across the building, with crescent-shaped windows at the side ends, and is oriented northwest-southeast. The Church is topped with a pyramid-shaped dome in the style of traditional Armenian churches.

=== Souk al-Haraj ===
Souk al-Haraj is an old souk that sells many things, old and new. "Haraj" is the Arabic word for chaos. The exact age of the souk is not known to any of its workers or pioneers, but the old stories about it indicate that it is one of the oldest markets in al-Rusafa, and they say that it is even older than the Rusafa neighborhoods that were built by the Ottoman governors. The souk includes a catalog full of items including luxurious international paintings, Arab clothing, maqam recordings, machinery pieces, oud, old furniture, old clocks, rare antiques and many more. Rare antiques were a famous trading activity with Arabs, foreigners and amateur collectors.

=== Mosque-Madrasa of al-Ahmadiyya ===
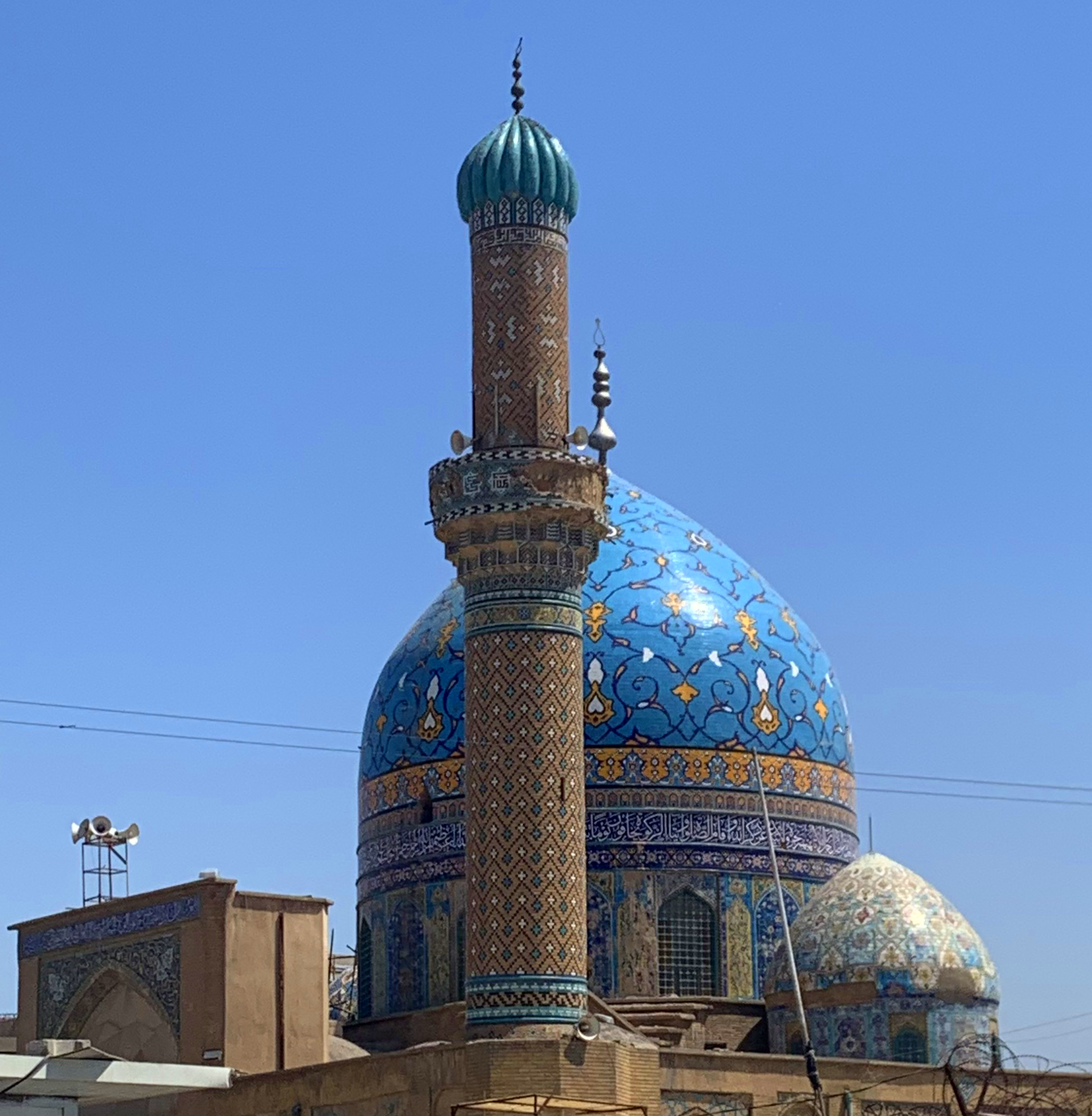
Mosque-Madrasa of al-Ahmadiyya as of 2023.

The Mosque-Madrasa of al-Ahmadiyya (Arabic: جامع الأحمدية), also known as al-Maidan Mosque (Arabic: جامع الميدان), is an old cultural mosque located in the square. Built between 1780 and 1802 during Ottoman rule, the mosque consists of a wide yard and a winter chapel raised from the ground and an adjoining porch, as well as a summer chapel in addition to a number of rooms adjacent to the wall of the mosque. Qur’anic verses, and the minaret of the mosque is located next to the dome, which is high and built of colored stones. On both sides of the main dome there are two small domes decorated with beautiful inscriptions and decorations.

The mosque was described by Scottish traveler James Baillie Fraser as the "Great Mosque" of the square while British traveler James Silk Buckingham described it as having a "handsome dome and minaret" and was amazed by its colored tiles and faience but was disappointed to find out that the inside wasn't special outside of being clean and well lighted.

=== Al-Muradiyya Mosque ===
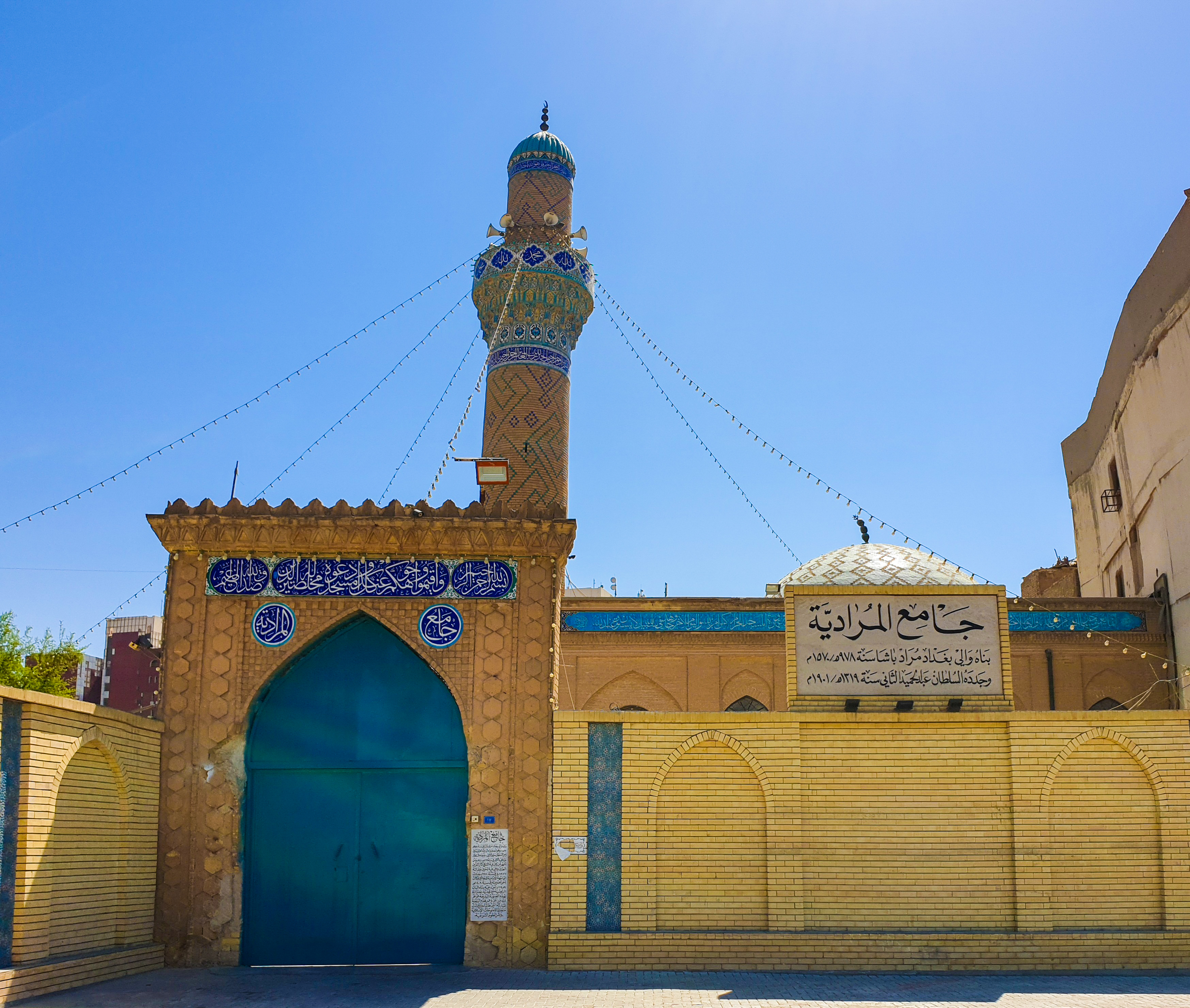
Al-Muradiyya Mosque.

Murad Pasha Mosque (Arabic: جامع مراد باشا), also known as al-Muradiyya Mosque (Arabic: جامع المراديه), is an old mosque located opposite the old Ministry of Defense named after Kuyucu Murad Pasha who also built it. The mosque consists of a wide chapel surmounted by a flattened semi-spherical dome. It was decorated with simple motifs of Kashani, and besides it are six small and flat domes as well. In the northwest corner there is a minaret or minaret, which is also built of stone and decorated with colored decorations and stalactite. Currently, the mosque is considered a heritage and was renewed in 2009 at a time when most religious buildings in Baghdad were suffering from neglect.

=== The Uzbek Mosque ===
The Uzbek Mosque (Arabic: جامع الأزبك) is an old mosque located near Bab al-Mu'adham and was built by the Emir of Uzbekistan in 1650 during a trip and became a center of gathering for Uzbek immigrants in Baghdad. The leader Abd al-Karim Qasim demolished the mosque 1961 during expansion works of the old Ministry of Defense, and it was rebuilt in a new form that still stands today. Qasim resorted to this mosque when the 1963 coup took place. He spent the night in the mosque before he was arrested and then executed.

== Modern day use ==
After recent events of the Iraq War, al-Maidan Square declined and was described as a "poor courtyard containing only some of those who earn a living through simple work and others who used to frequent it." The street was filled with piles of waste. It became full of street vendors who blocked the sidewalks, as well as suffering from murderers, thieves, drug dealers, harassers, and bandits who attacked passers-by in light of the deteriorating security situation. Due to the increase of car ownership and the lack of absorption, the square has become extremely overcrowded that the development of road infrastructure became impossible. The square is especially crowded with cars during morning hours.

In 2016, al-Maidan Square was reopened by the Ministry of Transport and announced the operation of five lines to transport passengers on both sides of Baghdad.

== See also ==
- Al-Firdos Square
- Al-Rasheed Street
- Al-Tahrir Square
- List of neighborhoods and districts in Baghdad
