= Zumurrud Khatun Mosque and Mausoleum =

Mosque and Mausoleum in Baghdad, Iraq

Zumurrud Khatun Mausoleum
- قبر زمرد خاتون
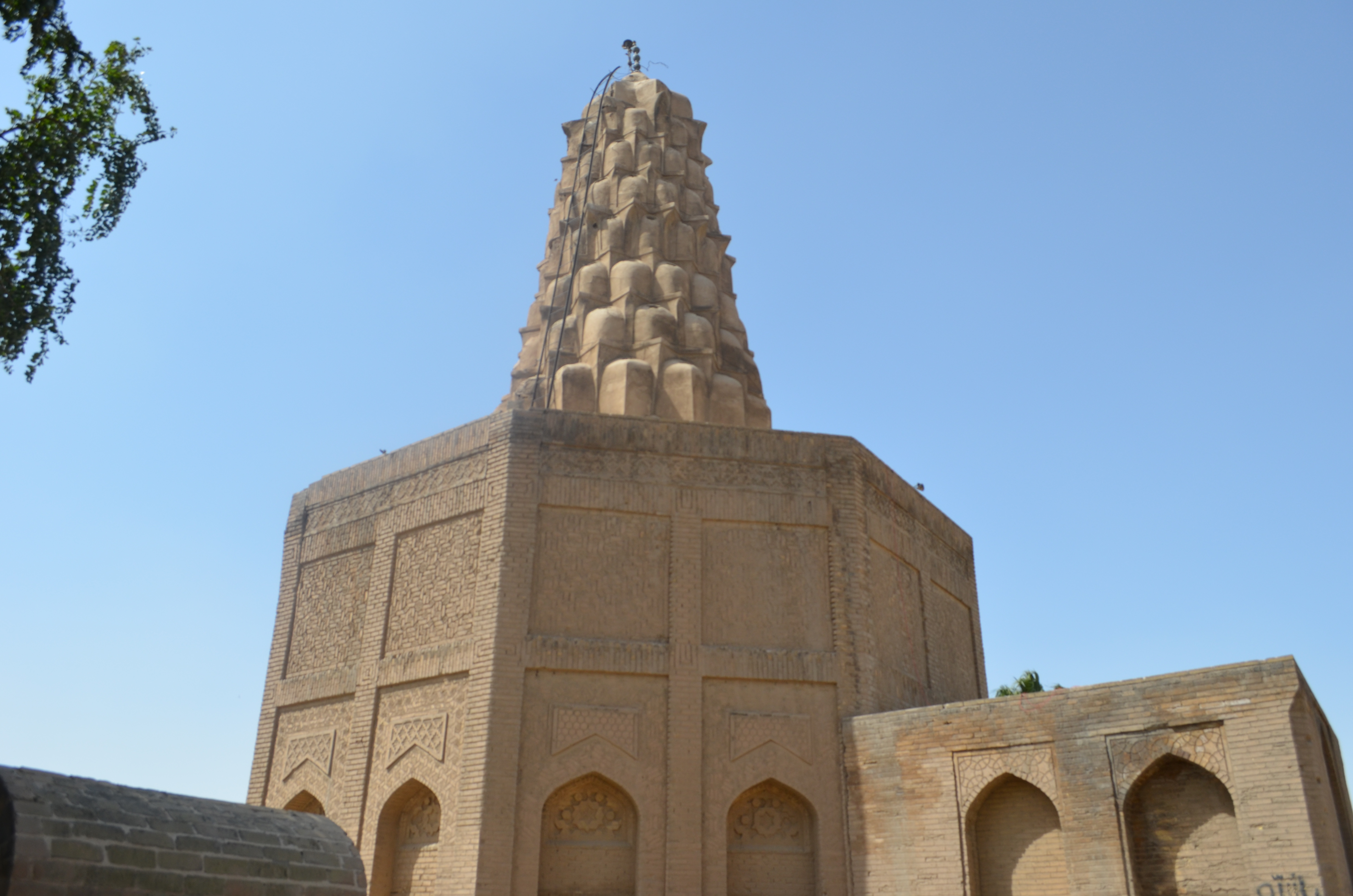
- The conical dome of the tomb in 2021

- Location of the mosque in Baghdad

Religion
- Affiliation: Islam
- Ecclesiastical or organizational status: Mosque and shrine
- Status: Active

Location
- Location: Sheikh Ma'ruf Cemetery, Baghdad, Baghdad Governorate
- Country: Iraq
- Interactive map of Zumurrud Khatun Mausoleum
- Coordinates: 33°19′54″N 44°22′23″E

Architecture
- Type: Mosque architecture
- Style: Abbasid
- Founder: Zumurrud; Al-Nasir
- Funded by: Al-Nasir
- Completed: c. 1202 CE

Specifications
- Dome: One
- Minaret: One
- Shrine: One: Zumurrud Khatun
- Materials: Bricks; plaster; stone; wood

The Zumurrud Khatun Mausoleum (Arabic: قبر زمرد خاتون, romanized: qabr zumurrud ḵātūn or Arabic: مرقد زمرد خاتون, romanized: marqad zumurrud ḵātūn), also known as the Tomb of Sitta Zubayda, is a mosque and shrine located in Baghdad, in the Baghdad Governorate of Iraq. The structure contains the tomb of Zumurrud Khatun, and dates from the Abbasid era. It is located in Sheikh Ma'ruf Cemetery in the Karkh side of Baghdad, and the site was built at the patronage of Zumurrud and her son. Zumurrud was the wife of the 33rd Abbasid caliph, al-Mustadi (r. 1170–1180) and mother of Caliph al-Nasir (r. 1180–1225). She collected the waqf money from madrasas and built her mausoleum, located in Karkh, before her death.

The building is covered by the distinct nine-layered muqarnas dome capped by a small cupola. The dome is considered to be the earliest surviving example of its type in Baghdad. The building has robust construction made of bricks and plaster. There is also an attached library, and an adjoined Shafi'i madrasa. Due to the mosque being dominated by Hanafi maddhab, the extension to the north for Shafi'i maddhab was added, which is called Shafi'i Mosque.

== History ==
Zumurrud Khatun was identified as a formerly-enslaved Turkic woman who became a prominent noblewoman during the Abbasid era. She rose to this position through multiple marriages, including her marriage to Caliph al-Mustadi, from which she gave birth to Caliph al-Nasir. She was described as being a pious woman and an active patroness of architecture and public works. Her legacy included restoration of public infrastructure and for building educational and funerary buildings. The mosque and mausoleum were created at the commission of al-Nasir and his mother before her death in 1202 CE. After her death, she was laid to rest in the mausoleum following a funeral procession.

Zamurrud Khatun was also actively involved in the construction of a madrasa. Furthermore, she was also remembered by many as an active member in politics and Islamic religious policies, a generous person devoted to Islamic teachings and law, and various other aspects. For instance, she is in history for spending 300,000 dirhams to repair water supplies and cisterns during the pilgrimage.

== Architecture ==
The building features a nine-layered conically-shaped muqarnas roof topped off with a cupola. The inside room of the structure is approximately 3 metres (9.8 ft) long and 7 metres (23 ft) wide. Beyond the entrance is a narrow staircase that leads to the grave room at the base of the minaret. The roofing system of the mausoleum originated in a period in Islamic art in the 11th and 12th centuries. Sources state that this type of mosque and mausoleum might have originated in Iraq although there are similar structures in locations around regions of Iran.

In addition to the tomb of Zumurrud Khatun, also located in Karkh is the mausoleum and mosque of Sheikh Maruf.

=== Dome ===
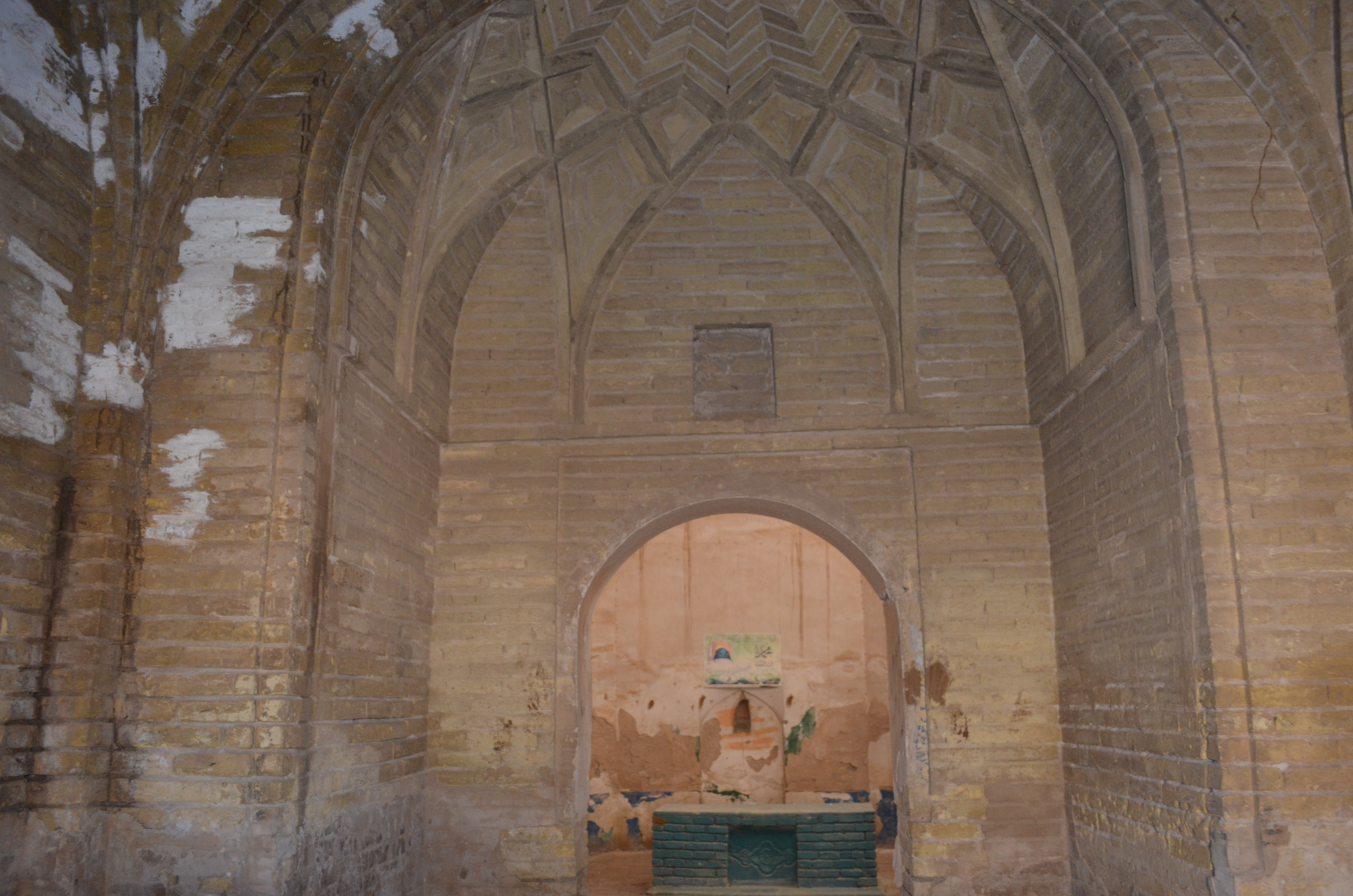
Interior view of tomb layout.

The mausoleum's dome is made out of muqarnas, (also known as stalactite or honeycomb vaulting) one of the most original inventions of Islamic architecture which can appear in a variety of materials such as; stucco, brick, stone, and wood. Muqarnas can be applied in multiple architectural forms including; cornices, corbelled transitions, capitals, vaults, and domes, as with the Zumurrud Khatun Mosque. Brick vaults and domes have been known in the Near East since Sassanian times, if not before, but the dome in muqarnas is a truly Islamic creation without precedent in any civilization. Tabba described Zumurrud Khatun's shrine to be the "most graceful profile and one of the most integrated interiors of all conical muqarnas domes." Not only does the dome consist of an octagonal base it also includes geometric decorations that support the conical brick vault. In which the Muqarnas display their exterior articulations of the muqarnas on the outside instead of its interior which makes the illusion of the dome to appear as pinecone.

The mausoleum of Zamurrud Khatum is designed as a monumental and unique structure similar to Islamic architecture of the time. It is developed with integrated layers that make its structure artistic. Its base is octagonal, a transition that has informed the construction of modern structures such as the Pentagon in the United States. On top of its octagonal base, the mausoleum gradually and unobtrusively transitions into a dome of sixteen cells pegged on muqarnas squinches that keeps the base and the upper part in sync. Seven tiers occupy most of the sixteen cells, stucco-layered against the remaining tiers. Each of the cells embodies a tiny opening covered by thick glass, giving the viewer an obscured view.

== Controversies ==
=== Identification ===
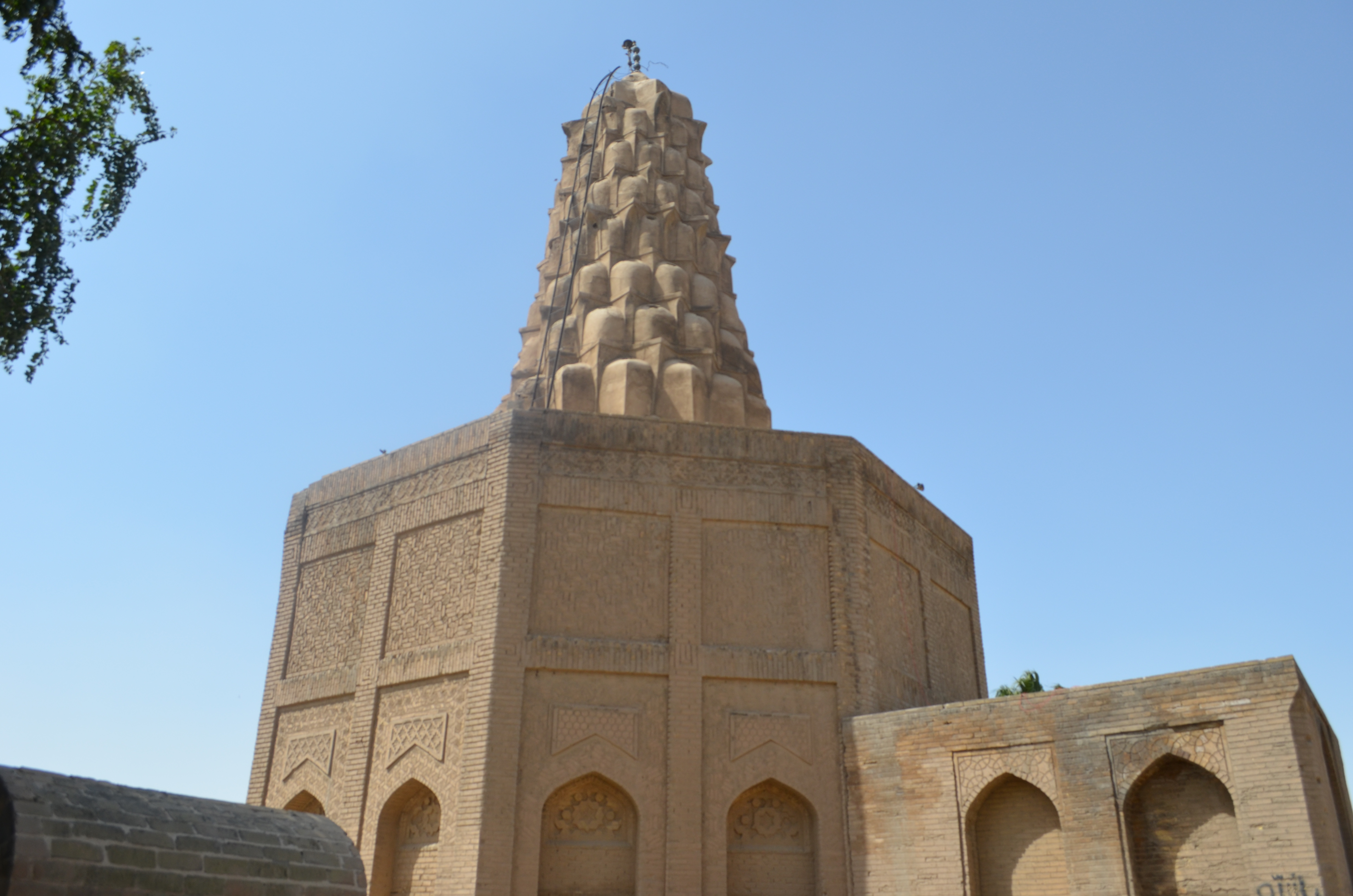
Zumurrud Khatun Tomb in Baghdad (built in 1202 CE)

According to Vincenzo Strika, the mosque and mausoleum were repeatedly misidentified by scholars. Most commonly, the mosque and mausoleum were quoted as being created by Sitta Zubayda rather than by Zumurrud. Strika investigated the history of this misunderstanding and believed it was created by earlier scholars, challenged by Guy Le Strange and later solved by Mustafa Jawād. Strika highlighted that "... the first to hint that the Tomb was not that of Zubaydah was, Le Strange.", referencing Le Strange's finding that Sitta Zubayda was buried elsewhere. Confusion as to the identities of Sitta Zubayda and Zumurrud also was a catalyst for some of this misidentification. In the past, researchers considered if the two women were, in reality, a single person who had been confused as being two separate people, but since it has been determined that Sitta Zubayda was, in fact, a different noblewoman.

=== Architecture ===
The mausoleum was tracked into controversies, especially regarding the originality of its architectural design. Many argue that the mausoleum's designs were borrowed from other shrines built in Baghdad, Tigris, and other parts of Iraq. For instance, it was argued that the architectural design Zamurrud's mausoleum owas borrowed from the shrine of al-Najmi and the mausoleum of Nur al-Din, constructed earlier than this mausoleum. However, the exact dates upon which these monuments were constructed are unclear.

== Gallery ==
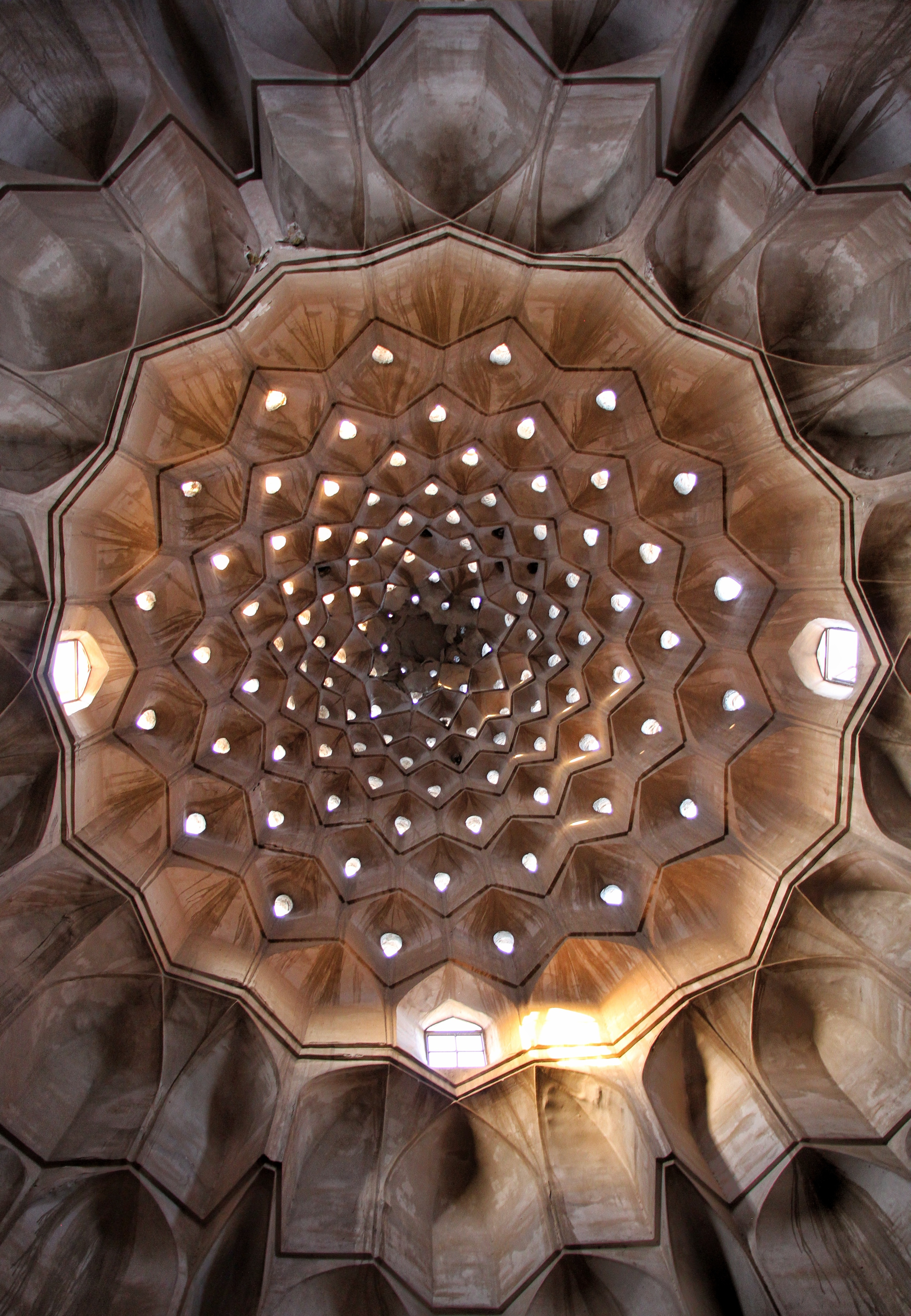
Interior view of the tomb's muqarnas dome

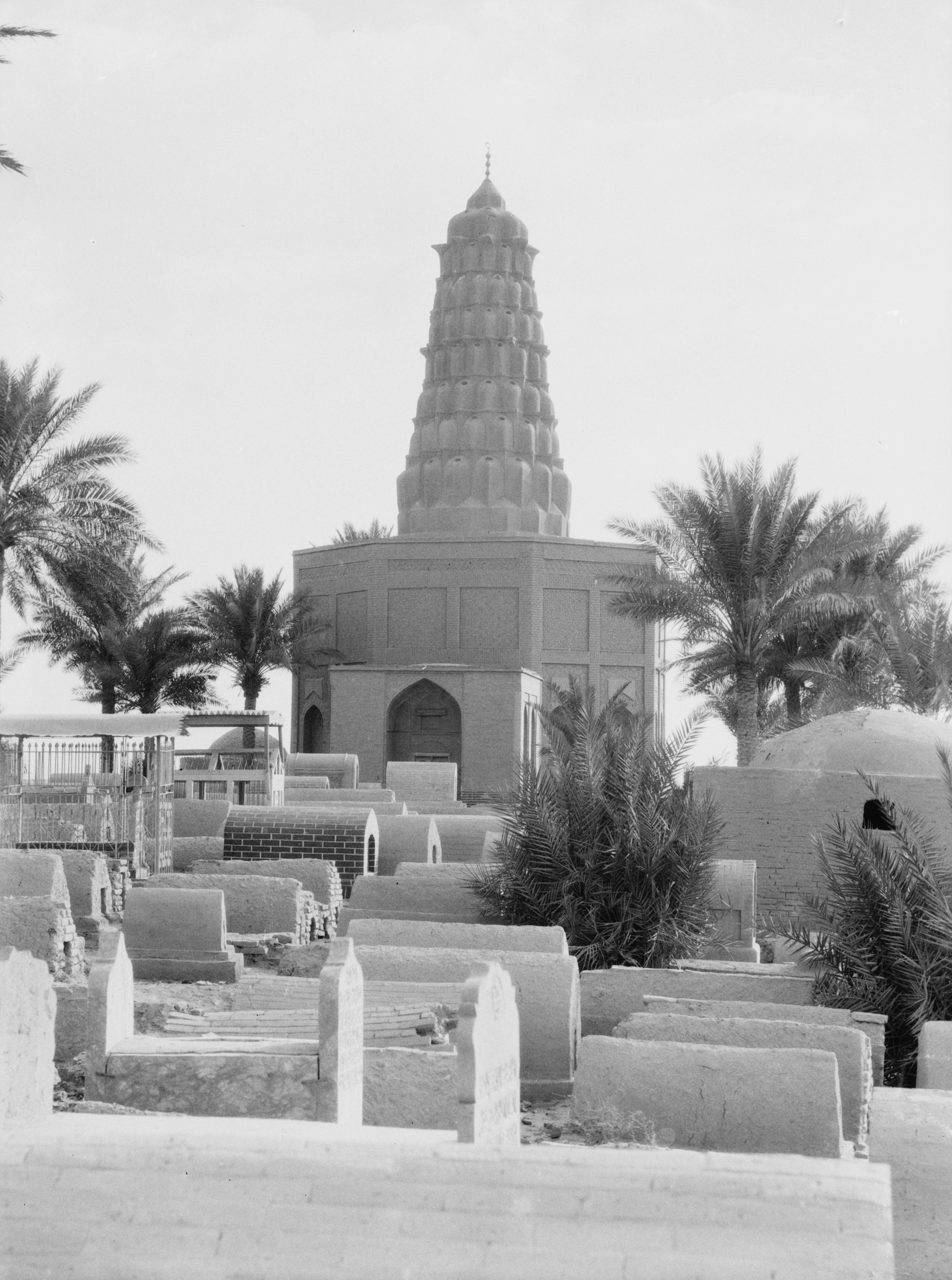
Zumurrud Khatun mausoleum in 1932, in front of a smaller domed mausoleum

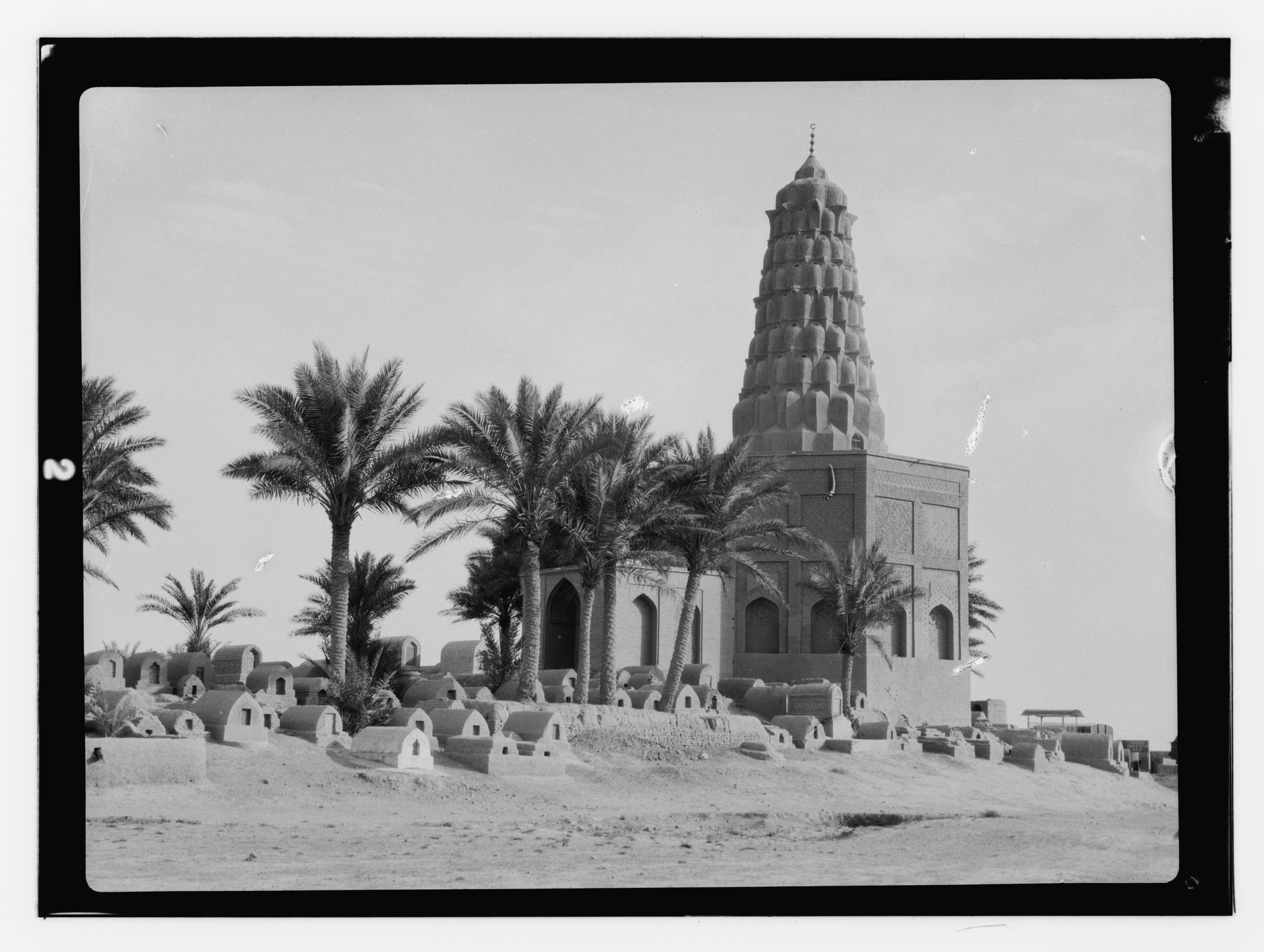
Zumurrud's Tomb

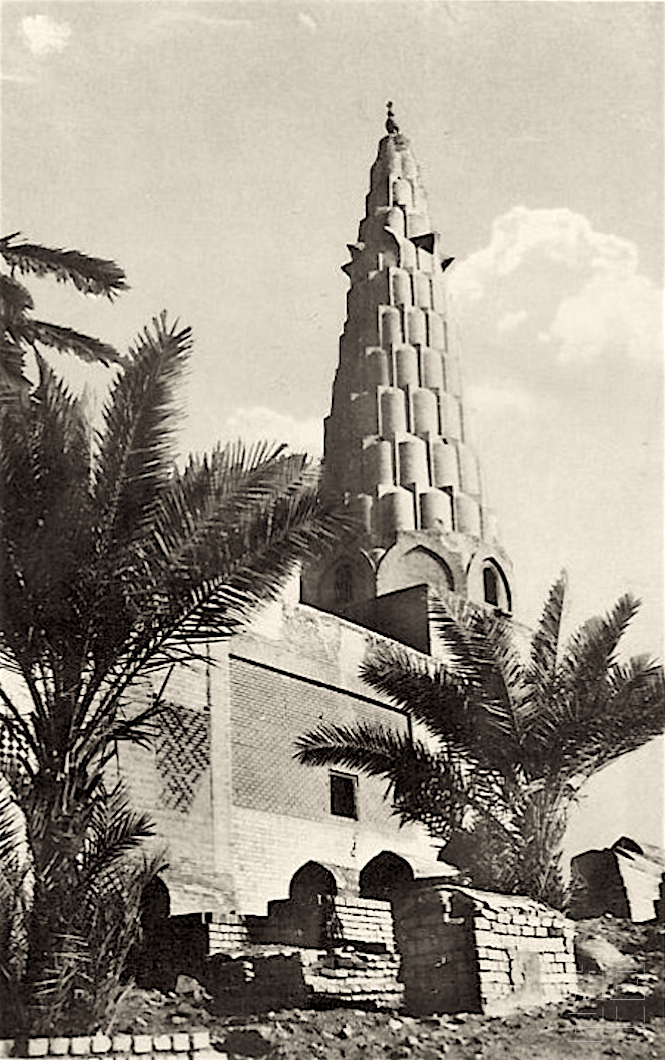
The mosque, in the 1950s

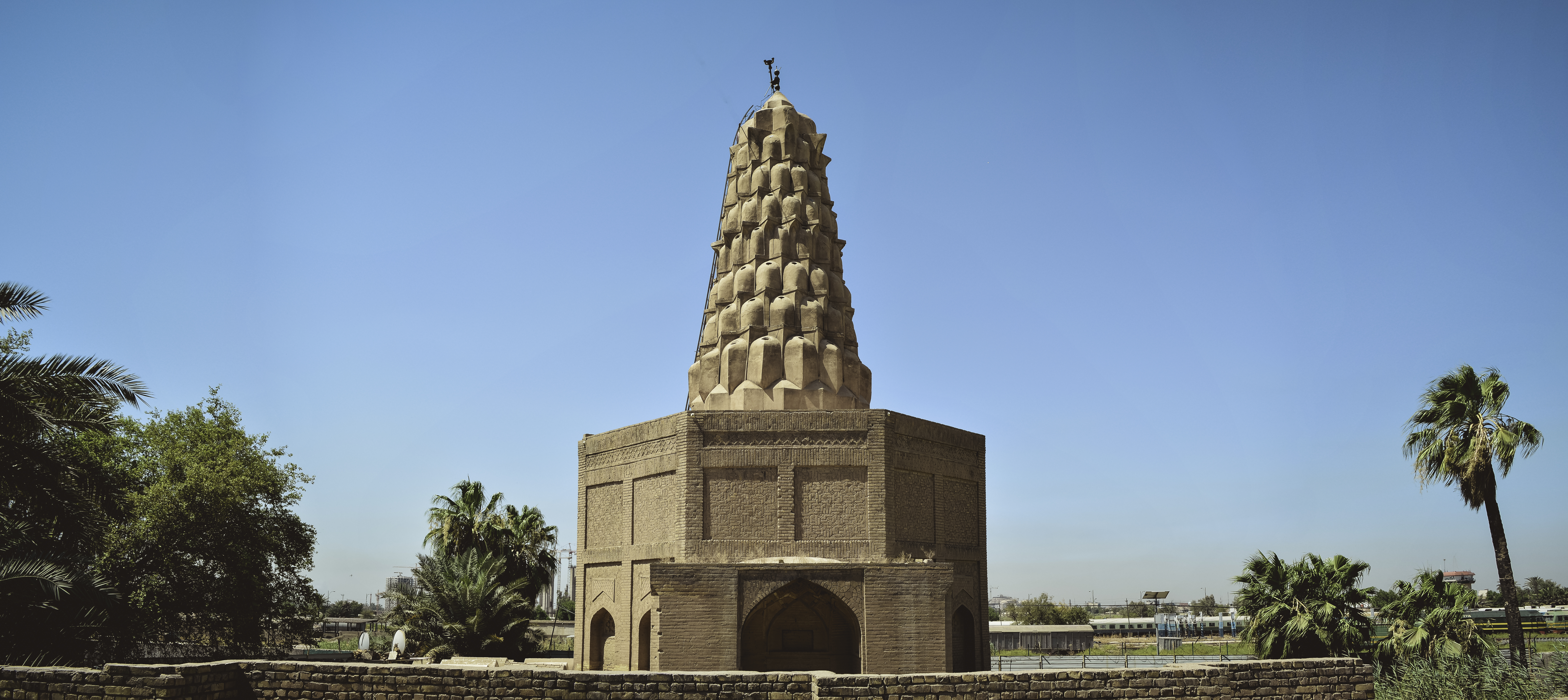
Outside view of mausoleum

== See also ==
- Islam in Iraq
- List of mosques in Iraq
- Al-Sarai Mosque
