= Abdul Karim Zaidan =

- Minister Of State For Waqf Affairs
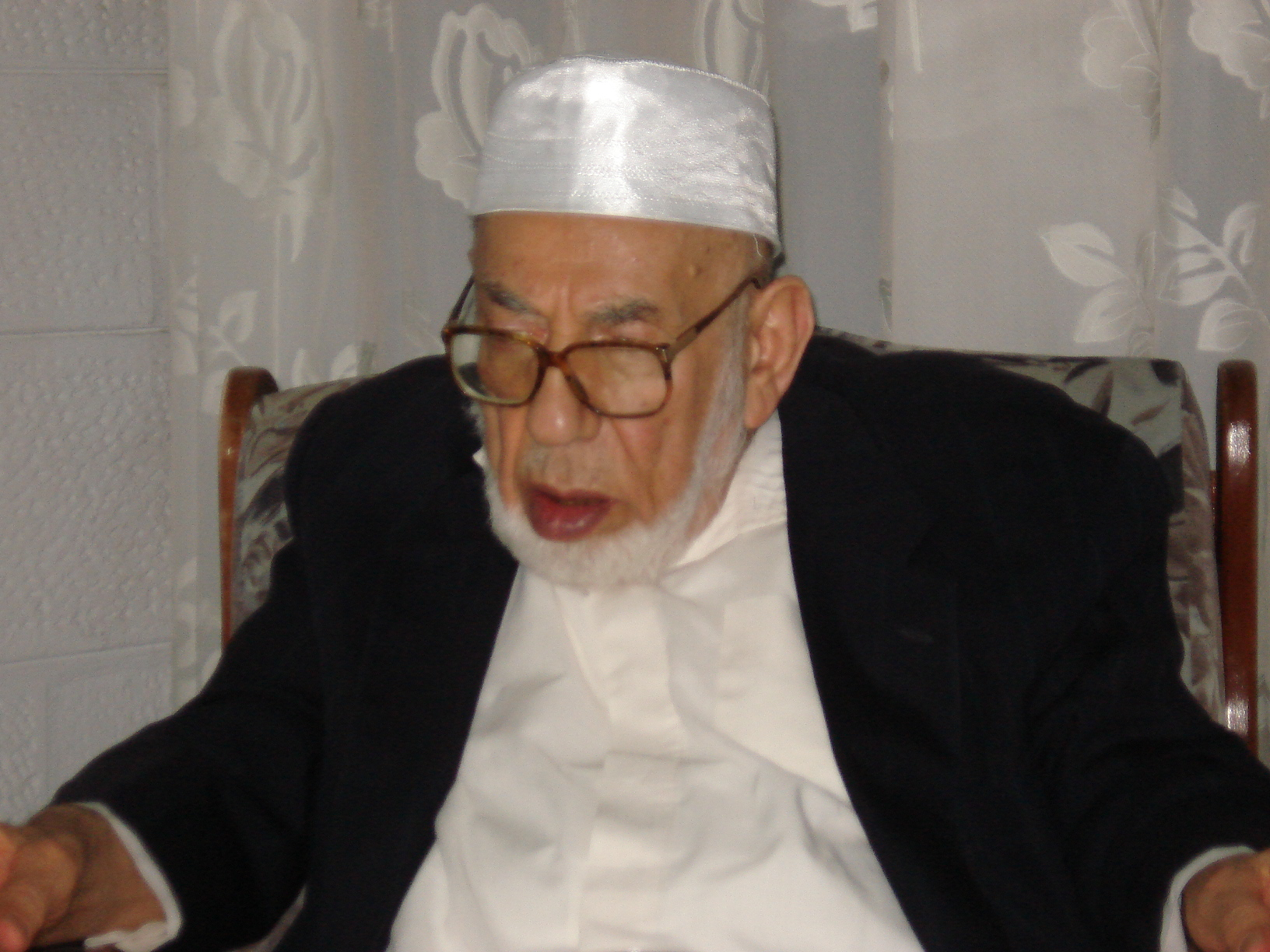
- Zaidan, photographed in 2006
- Predecessor: Hamoudi Mahdi
- Successor: Hamad Ali Ahmad al-Karbala'i
- Born: 1917; Baghdad, Kingdom of Iraq
- Died: 27 January 2014 (97 years old); Sana'a, Yemen
- Burial: Sheikh Ma'ruf Cemetery, Karkh
- Religion: Sunni Islam

Abdul Karim Zaidan (Arabic: عبد الكريم زيدان) was an Iraqi politician who formerly served as the Minister of State for Waqf Affairs. He also was chairman for the Muslim Brotherhood division in Iraq. Aside from his political career, Zaidan was also an Islamic scholar and a jurist.

== Early life ==
Born in 1917, Abdul Karim Zaidan studied the Qur'an in his youth under several Islamic scholars with teaching qualifications. At adulthood he served as a teacher and later a principal in several schools and universities throughout the city of Baghdad. Zaidan later graduated from the Cairo University in the 1960s with a master's degree and a doctorate.

== Political career ==
Zaidan served as the Minister Of State For Waqf Affairs in 1968 from 17 to 30 July. He was then succeeded in this role by Hamad Ali Ahmad al-Karbala'i. He also served as a head chairman for the Muslim Brotherhood in Iraq until the mid-1990s.

== Books ==
One of Zaidan's most prominent works is his al-Mufassal fi 'Ahkam al-Mar'ah wa Bayt al-Muslim fi al-Shari'at al-Islamiyyah, an eleven-volume treatise about Women in Islam and the rulings regarding family issues.

== Death ==
Zaidan died in 2014 while he was in Sana'a, Yemen. His body was transported back to Iraq, where he received a proper burial in the Sheikh Ma'ruf Cemetery in the Karkh district.
