= Sayyida Zumurrud Khatun =

Mother of Abbasid caliph Al-Nasir

Sayyida Zumurrud Khatun السيدة زمرد خاتون
- Died: December 1202/January or February 1203; Baghdad, Abbasid Caliphate
- Burial: Sheikh Maarouf Cemetery, Baghdad in Zumurrud Mosque
- Spouse: Al-Mustadi
- Children: Ahmad al-Nasir
Names
- Sayyida Zumurrud Khatun Umm al-Nasir
- Religion: Sunni Islam

Sayyida Zumurrud Khatun (Arabic: السيدة زمرد خاتون, died 1203) also known as Umm al-Nasir (Arabic: أم الناصر) was one of Caliph al-Mustadi's concubines in the Abbasid harem. She was a Turkic, and was the mother of the future caliph al-Nasir.

== Biography ==
By most accounts, Zumurrud Khatun is identified as a formerly-enslaved Turkic woman who became a prominent noblewoman during the later Abbasid Caliphate. She rose to this position through marriage to Caliph al-Mustadi. Zumurrud Khatun is also remembered as the mother of Caliph al-Nasir. She is described as being a pious woman and an active patroness of architecture and public works.

Her legacy as patroness was due to her restoration of public infrastructure and for building educational and funerary buildings. The Mosque and Mausoleum of Zumurrud Khatun were created at the commission of al-Nasir and his mother before her death in 1202. After her death, she was laid to rest in the mausoleum following a funeral procession.

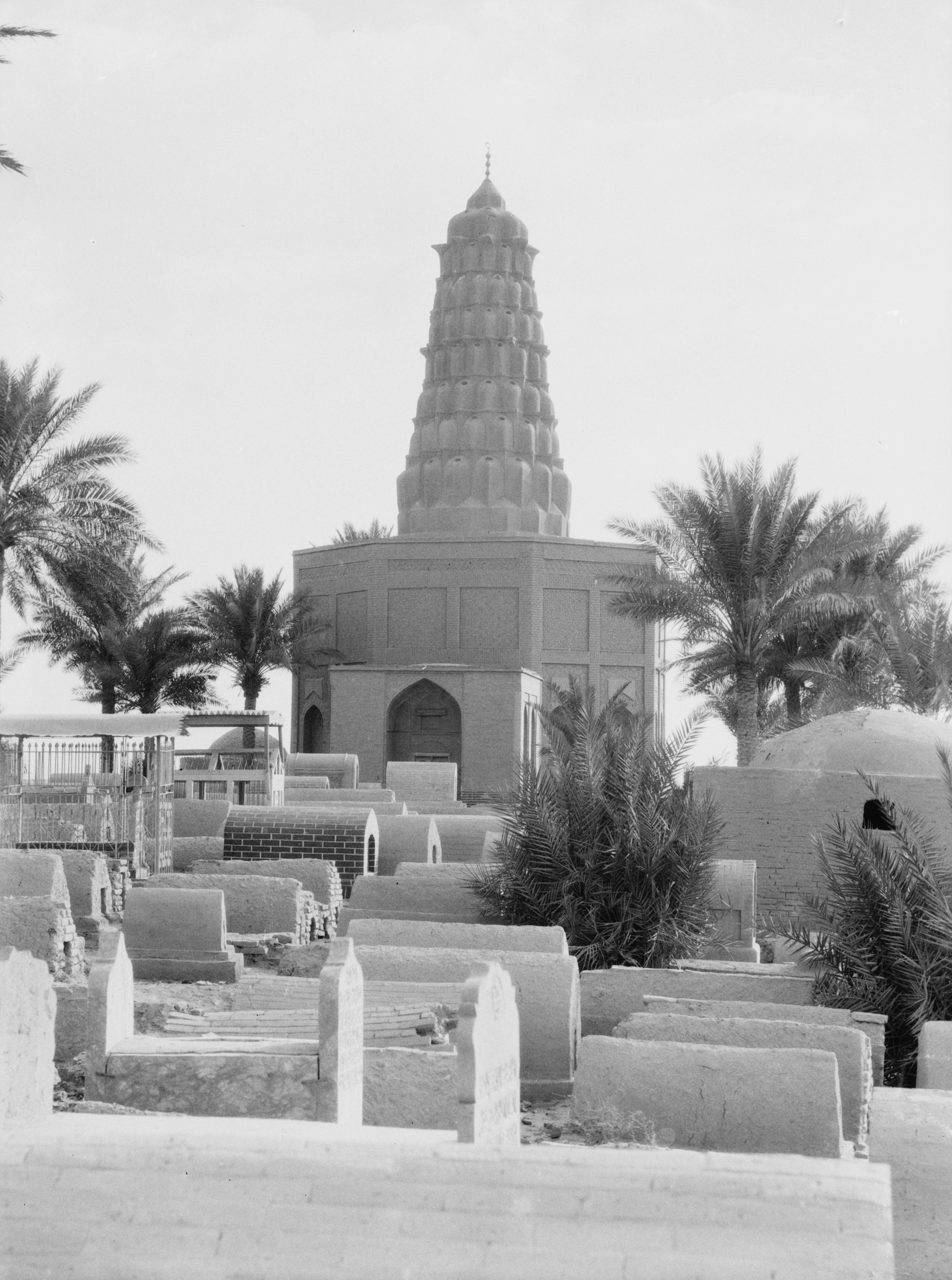
Zumurrud's Mausoleum in Sheikh Maarouf Cemetery at Baghdad

Zamurrud Khatun was also actively involved in the construction of a madrasa. Furthermore, she was also remembered by many as an active member in politics and Islamic religious policies, a generous person devoted to Islamic teachings and law, and various other aspects. For instance, she is in history for spending 300,000 dirhams to repair water supplies and cisterns during the pilgrimage.

== Death ==
Various chronicles describe Sayyida Zumurrud Khatun as "a very devout woman" who pleaded with her son to free the famous scholar Ibn al-Jawzi. Zumurrud was herself a follower of Hanbali school.

She died in December 1202–January 1203, or January–February 1203, and was buried in her own mausoleum in Sheikh Maarouf Cemetery.
