= Uzbek Mosque =

Old Iraqi mosque built in the Ottoman Empire in 1682

- جامع الأزبك
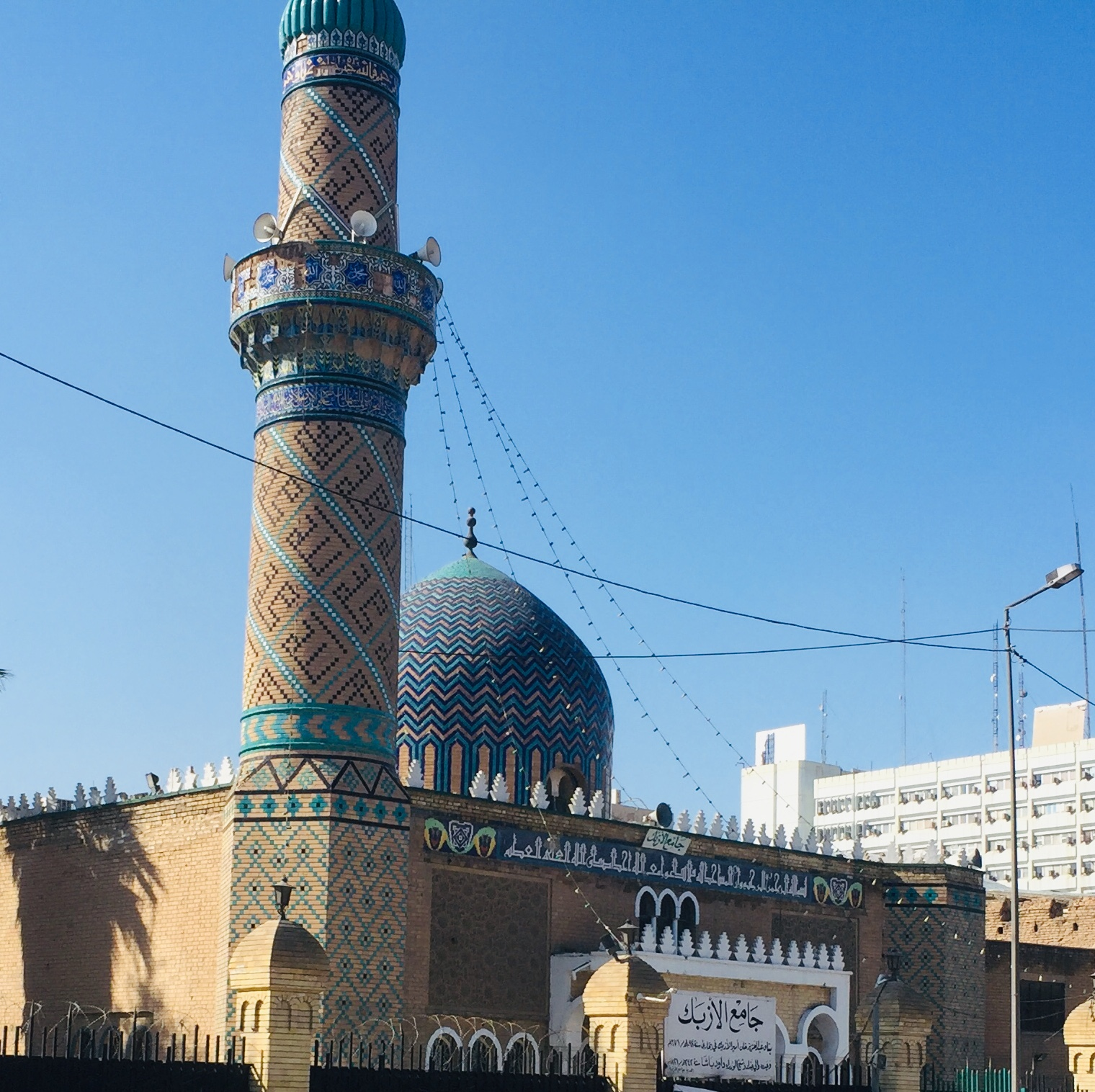
- The mosque in 2023

- Location of the mosque in Baghdad

Religion
- Affiliation: Sunni Islam
- Ecclesiastical or organisational status: Mosque
- Governing body: Sunni Endowment Office
- Status: Active

Location
- Location: al-Rusafa, Baghdad, Baghdad Governorate
- Country: Iraq
- Interactive map of Uzbek Mosque
- Coordinates: 33°20′47″N 44°22′00″E

Architecture
- Type: Mosque architecture
- Style: Ottoman
- Founder: Abd al-Aziz Khan
- Completed: 1682 CE

Specifications
- Dome: One
- Minaret: Two (one small)

The Uzbek Mosque (Arabic: جامع الأزبك), also known as the Mosque of al-Azbak and the al-Azbak Mosque or simply the Azbak Mosque, is a Sunni mosque located in the al-Rusafa district of Baghdad, in the Baghdad Governorate of Iraq. It is distinguished by its architecture and history that date from the 17th century. The mosque is also unique due to its association with the Uzbek people (whom the mosque gets its name from) who immigrated to and lived in Baghdad. Sheikh Jalal al-Hanafi was its imam and preacher in the late 1930s.

== History ==
=== Irrigation, shrine and significance ===
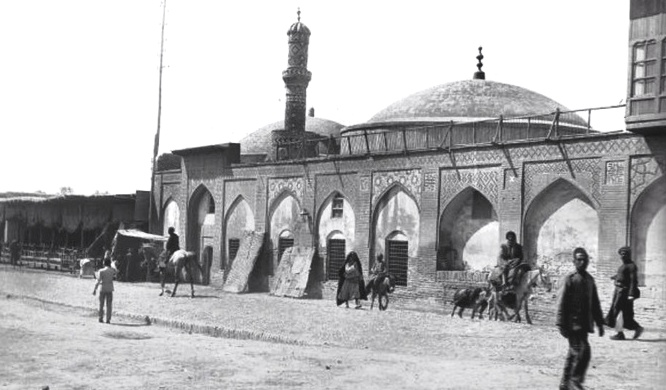
The mosque in c. 1917–1919

The mosque's construction dates from 1682 CE when the Emir of the Khanate of Bukhara, Abd al-Aziz Khan, built it at the tomb of his uncle, Quli Khan, who died in Baghdad on a trip to Hajj in 1650. Two years after his brother, Subhan Quli Khan, took the throne of the Khanate in 1680, Abd al-Aziz settled in the mosque to be with his uncle.

During the rule of the Ottoman Sultan, Murad IV, many Uzbeks started to immigrate and settle in Baghdad and the mosque became known for being the center of gatherings of the Uzbek people living in the city at the time who were known to practice the profession of sharpening knives. The mosque saw a downfall during the reign of the Mamluk ruler Dawud Pasha in 1818 who renovated the mosque and gave it a small minaret which the mosque also became notable for. The mosque also has a madrasa for jurisdiction that was also established by Dawud Pasha.

=== During the 20th century ===
In 1917, the mosque was subjected to change when British soldiers removed the hospice when they entered Baghdad. The mosque was demolished at the time of leader Abd al-Karim Qasim in 1961 during expansion works of the old Ministry of Defense, and it was rebuilt in its current form. Shortly before it was demolished, teaching in the madrasa was abolished with the last teacher being Sheikh Salem bin Mustafa. The mosque later was a refuge for the leader. During the Ramadan Revolution in 1963 which overthrew Qasim's government, Qasim spent a night at the mosque before he was arrested and then executed.

The mosque is managed by the Sunni Endowment Office and is located in al-Maidan square, near the Mosque-Madrasa of al-Ahmadiyya.

Among the notables of the Uzbek Mosque were Sheikh Jalal al-Hanafi who was its imam and preacher in the late 1930s and the Islamic jurist and scholar Abd al-Karim Zaidan who used to give public lectures in this mosque.

== Description ==
The current mosque looks different from before its rebuilding and no longer contains a small minaret. The mosque has two minarets, the old one which only the base remains and was notable for being the smallest minaret in Baghdad, and the new one which is a thin minaret on the roof of the mosque. Next to the minaret is a lofty dome.

== Gallery ==
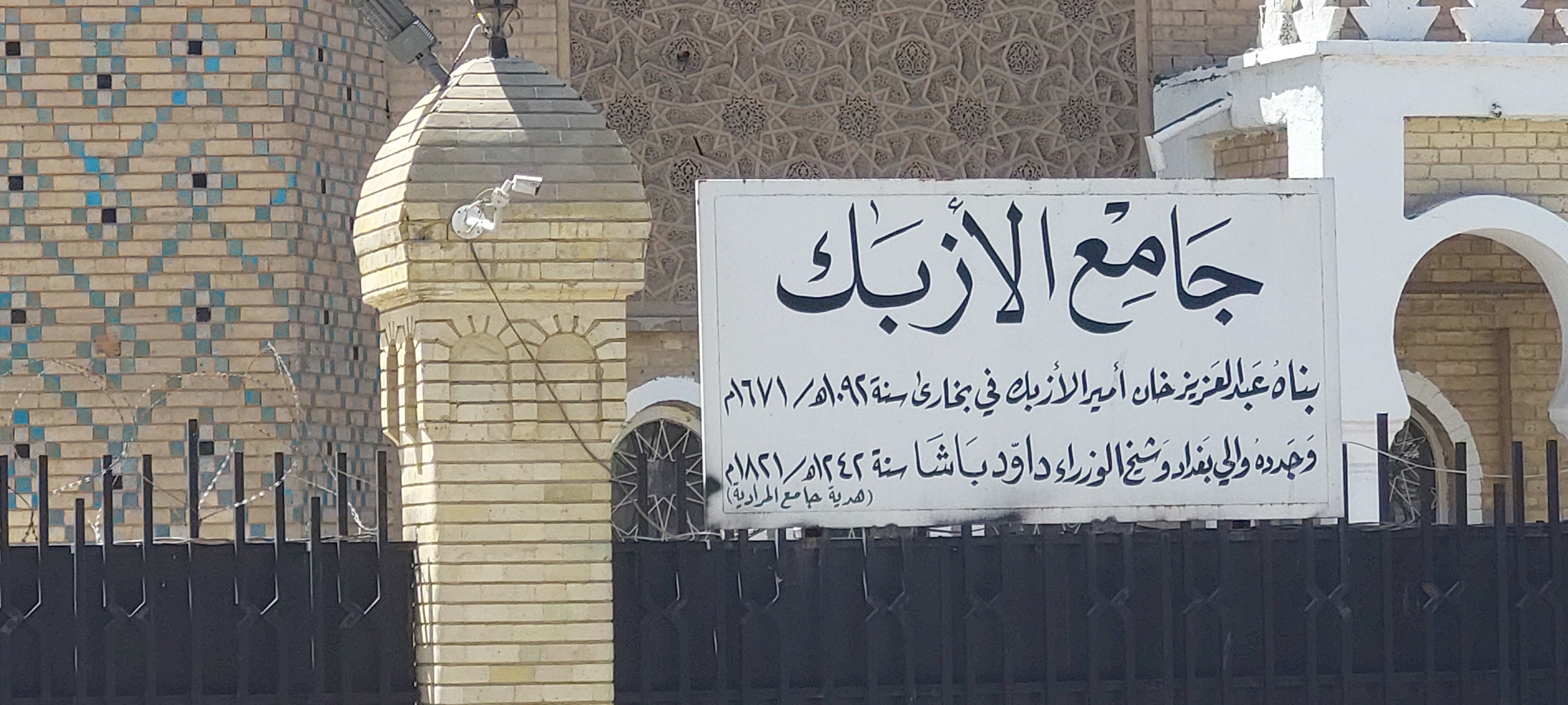
The mosque sign

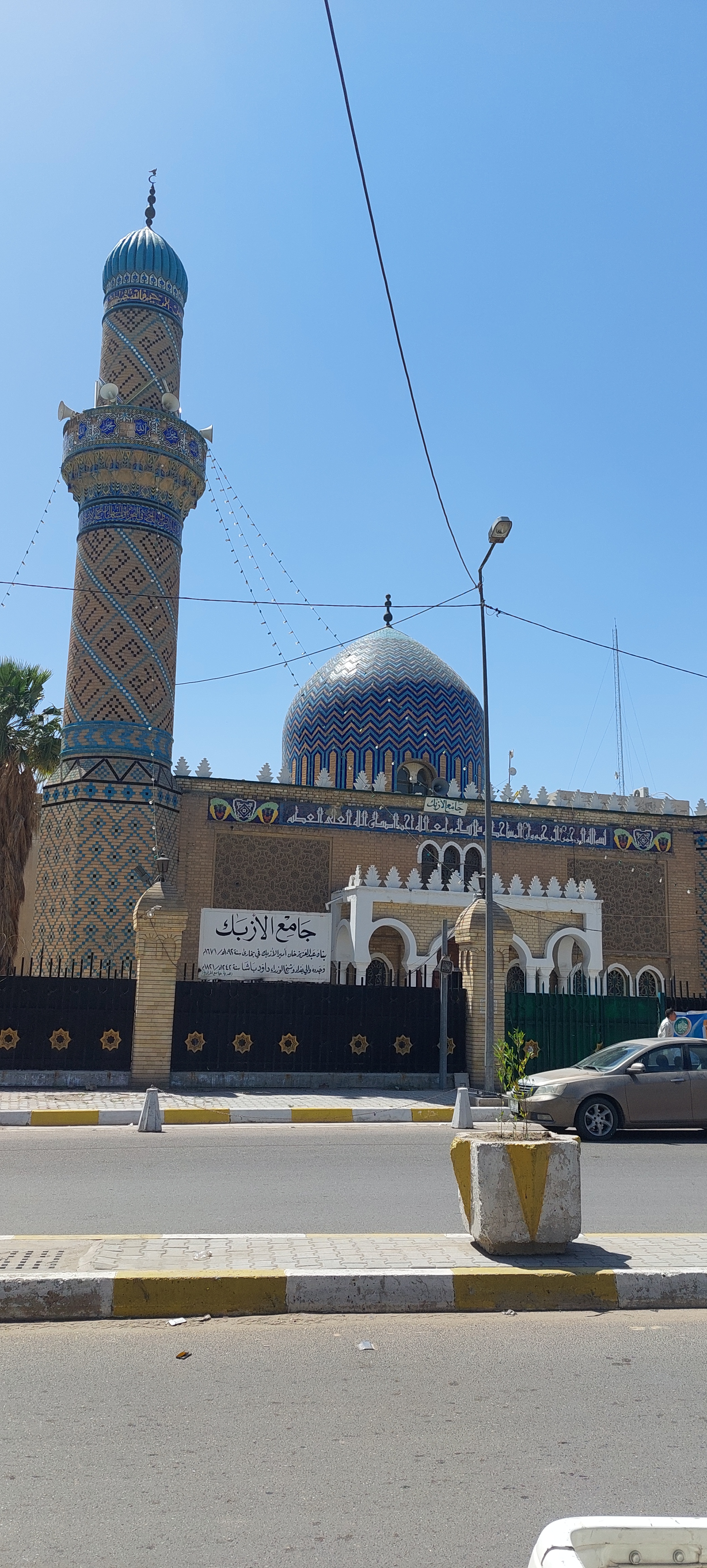
The mosque in 2023

== See also ==
- Islam in Iraq
- List of mosques in Baghdad
