= Pool of the Arches =

Underground pool in Ramla, Israel

The Pool of the Arches (Hebrew: Brechat Hakshatot), also known as The Pool of El Anzia or Saint Helena's Pool, is an ancient, enclosed underground water reservoir located in the city of Ramla in Central Israel. Completed in 789 AD during the Abbasid Caliphate under the reign of Caliph Harun al-Rashid, it is the only major architectural structure from the early Islamic Abbasid era to have survived intact in Israel. The reservoir, which appears to have been supplied with water from a small spring directly beneath it, remains remarkably preserved despite having withstood devastating earthquakes over the past twelve centuries. Today, the site serves as a popular historical monument and tourist attraction, famous for allowing visitors to row boats through its historic vaulted chambers.
