= Üveys Pasha =

Ottoman pasha, illegitimate son of Selim I (1488–1547)

Beylerbey of Baghdad Eyalet
- In office 1535–1547
- Monarch: Suleiman the Magnificent

Personal details
- Born: c.1512 Ottoman Empire
- Died: 1547 (aged 34–35) Yemen
- Parent: Selim I (father)

Üveys Pasha (1512–1547) was an Ottoman governor who served as the first governor of Baghdad following its capture in 1534, and later, following his capture of Ta'izz in 1545, the first governor of Yemen. He was an illegitimate son of Selim I.

He was a half-brother of Suleiman the Magnificent, to whom his relationship is largely undocumented.

== Background and Birth ==
According to the 16th century Ottoman historian Ali Mustafa Efendi, Selim, during his tenure as governor of Trabzon, fathered a son, Üveys, with an unnamed concubine. Selim's eldest son, heir and legitimate son, Şehzade Suleiman, who later ruled as Suleiman the Magnificent, was aware of this son of his father, but his relationship with Üveys is shrouded in mystery.

Üveys' mother was a harem girl whose name is not known, but reportedly, due to her undisciplined manners, she was expelled from the harem. In Ottoman tradition, such girls were matched to a bey or to a well-to-do man. However, in her case she was already pregnant with Selim's son at the time of her marriage, thus, Üveys was born to a stepfather.

== Life ==
Üveys' birth was initially kept highly secretive, with him being raised by his mother for the early years of his life, before being brought to Sultan Selim I, who upon seeing his son, reportedly remarked upon his striking resemblance to the Sultan, and ordered that he be brought to the palace permanently, to be raised and educated. Selim continued to care for and look after his son for the rest of his life, and Üveys soon became a high-ranking bureaucrat in the far reaches of the empire.

When Selim died in 1520, Üveys laid no claim to the throne, as according to Ottoman tradition, for a child to be considered part of the Ottoman Dynasty, they must be born at the palace, thus, children who were fathered by Ottoman Sultans and Şehzades but born after their mother was married off, were not considered princes of the dynasty, and thus, did not reserve a right to inheritance. (This principle was similar to the Byzantine tradition of "born in the purple", or Porphyrogenitos)

Suleiman I ascended to the throne in 1520, and he was careful to keep Üveys at the far reaches of his vast empire. Strikingly, in contrast with the Ottoman norms of the time, Suleiman did not have his half-brother strangled, and in 1535, soon after the capture of Baghdad (now capital of Iraq), Üveys was appointed as the first beylerbey of Baghdad, suggesting there was at least some warmth or communication between the half-brothers, as Baghdad was the most prestigious seat in all of Mesopotamia.

In 1545, Üveys was assigned to capture Ta'izz (a city in Yemen), in which he was successful, this led to Üveys then being appointed as the first governor of Ottoman Yemen, which he administered for two years.

=== Death and Suleiman's reaction ===
In 1547, a Marine named Pehlivan Hasan started a rebellion in Yemen. While trying to suppress the rebellion, Üveys was martyred. According to Ali Mustafa Efendi, upon learning the death of his half brother Suleiman was brought to tears, and said "he was my brother". When questioned why he had never had Üveys strangled despite the risk of sedition, Suleiman reportedly said "The fear of God that has always been in our (my) heart has prevented this!"
