= List of Ottoman governors of Baghdad =

== Ottoman Governors (1534–1623) ==
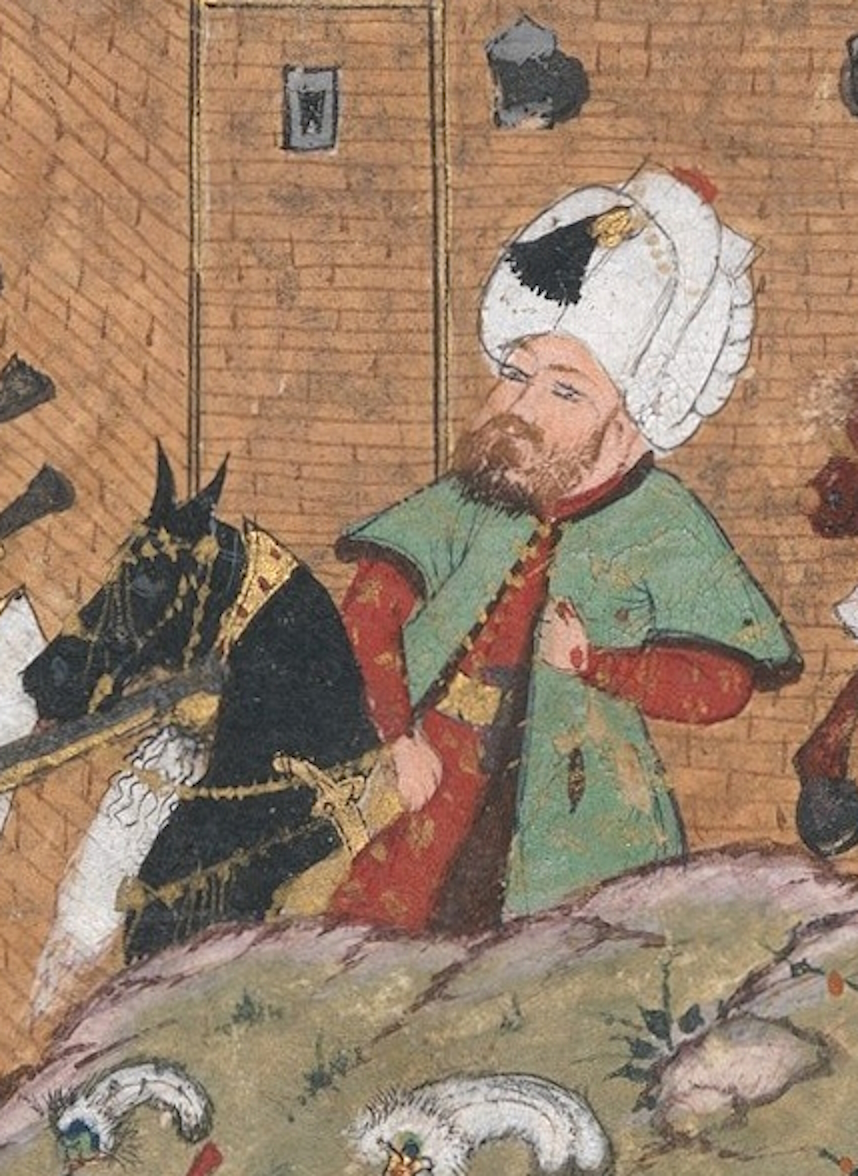
Sokulluzade Hasan Pasha entering Istanbul with the hostage Safavid Prince Haydar Mirza in 1590.

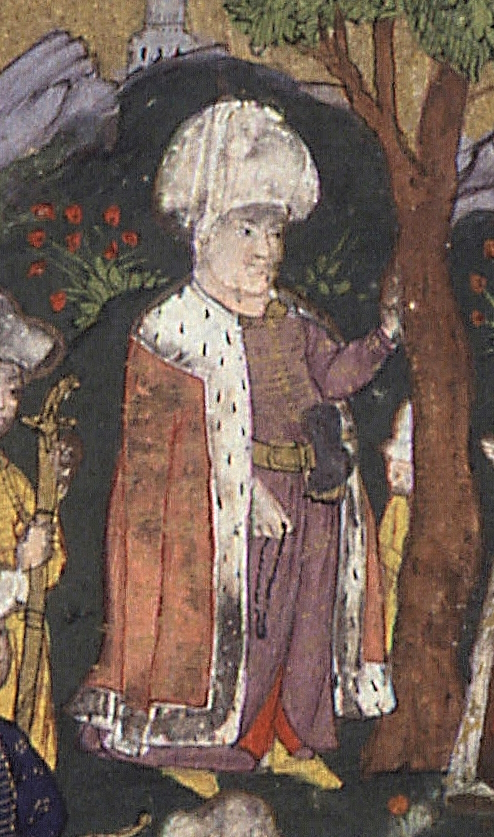
Hadim Yusuf Pasha, Ottoman Governor of Baghdad in 1605–1606, a Circassian by birth and a eunuch. Sefernāme of Muhlisi (BNF, Turc 127).

Ottoman capture of Baghdad in 1534.

- Hadım Suleiman Pasha (1535–1536)
- Ṣofu Meḥmed Paşa (1544–1545)
- Ayas Pasha (1545–1547)
- Murad Pasha (1569–1572)
- Elvendzāde ʿAlī Paşa (1574–1576, 1582–1583, 1597–1598)
- Cigalazade Yusuf Sinan Pasha (1586–1589, 1592)
- Ḥıżır Paşa (1592).
- Sokulluzade Hasan Pasha (1595–1596, 1598–1602)
- Mehmed Pasha, son of Sinan Pasha (1602–1604)
- Hadım Yusuf Paşa (1605–1606)
- Tavilzade Muhammed (rebel, 1606–1607)
- Mustafa b. Tavilzade Muhammed (rebel, 1608)
- Cigalazade Mahmud Paşa (1608)
- Kadızâde Ali Paşa (1610–1612)
- Dilaver Pasha (1614)
- Mustafa Paşa
- Hafız Ahmed Paşa (3 years)
- Kemankeş ʿAli Paşa
- Yusuf Paşa

=== Safavid control (1623–38) ===
Between 1623 and 1638, the city was under the control of the Safavid Empire. Safavid governors: Safiqoli Khan (c. 1625–1631) and Bektash Khan (1631–1638).

== Ottoman walis (1638–1704) ==
- Kashik Hassan Pasha (1638–1639)
- Darwesh Pasha (1639–1642)
- Kashik Hassan (1642–1644)
- Daly Hussain (1644–1644)
- Mohamed Pasha (1644–1645)
- Mussa Pasha (1645–1646)
- Ibrahim Pasha (1646–1646)
- Mussa Semiz (1546–1647)
- Malik Ahmed (1647–1647)
- Arsalan Najdi Zadah (1647–1649)
- Kablan Mustafa Marzonly (1649–1649)
- Hussain Pasha (1649–1650)
- Qarah Mustafa (1651–1652)
- Murtazah (1653–1654)
- Aq Mohamed (1654–1656)
- Khasiky Mohamed (1657–1659)
- Mustafa Pasha (1659–1659)
- Khasiky Mohamed (1659–1661)
- Kanbur Mustafa (1661–1663)
- Bambej Mustafa (1663–1664)
- Qarah Mustafa (1664–1664)
- Uzon Ibrahim (1664–1666)
- Qarah Mustafa (1666–1671)
- Selihdar Hussain (1671–1674)
- Abdulrahman Pasha (1674–1676)
- Kablan Mustafa Marzonly (1676–1677)
- Omar Pasha (1677–1681)
- Ibrahim Pasha (1681–1684)
- Omar Pasha (1684–1686)
- Shokoh Ahmed Katkothah (1686–1686)
- Omar Pasha (1686–1687)
- Hassan Pasha (1688–1690)
- Ahmed Bazergan (1690–1690)
- Ahmed Pasha (1691–1693)
- Haji Ahmed Qalayli (1693–1695)
- Ali Pasha (1695–1695)
- Hassan Pasha (1696–1698)
- Ismael Pasha (1698–1700)
- Ali Pasha (1700–1702)
- Youssef Pasha (1703–1704)

== Mamluk of Iraq (1704–1831) ==
The Mamluks ruled the pashaliks of Baghdad, Basrah, and Shahrizor. The pashalik of Mosul was ruled by the Iraqi Jalili dynasty.

- Hassan Pasha (1704–1723)
- Ahmad Pasha (1723–1747) son of Hassan
- Sulayman Abu Layla Pasha (1749–1762) son-in-law of Ahmad
- Omar Pasha (1762–1776) son of Ahmad
- Abdullah Pasha (1776–1777)
- Sulayman Pasha the Great (1780–1802) son of Omar
- Ali Pasha (1802–1807) son of Omar
- Sulayman Pasha the Little (1807–1810) son of Sulayman Great
- Said Pasha (1813–1816) son of Sulayman Great
- Dawud Pasha (1816–1831)

== Ottoman walis (1831–1917) ==
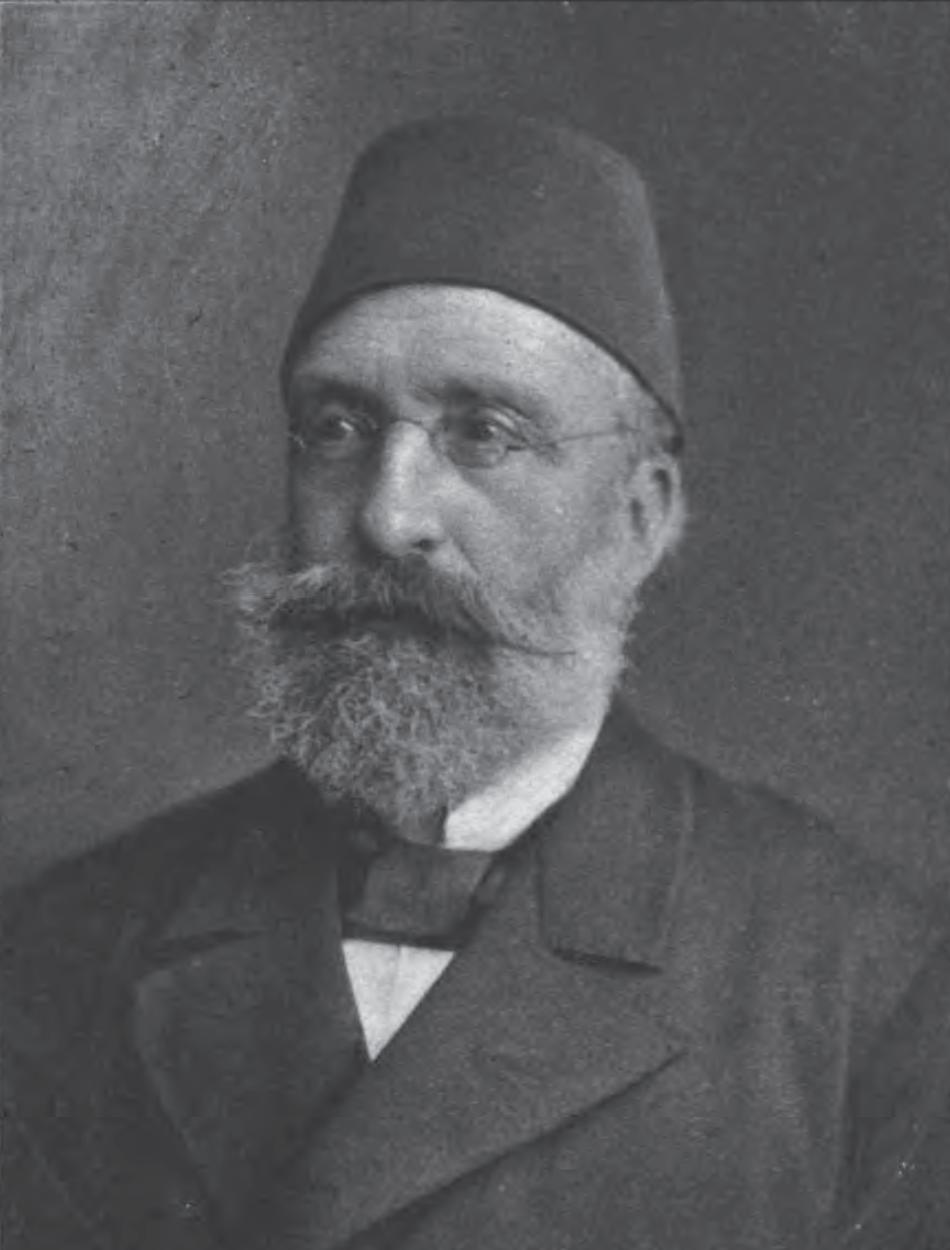
Midhat Pasha

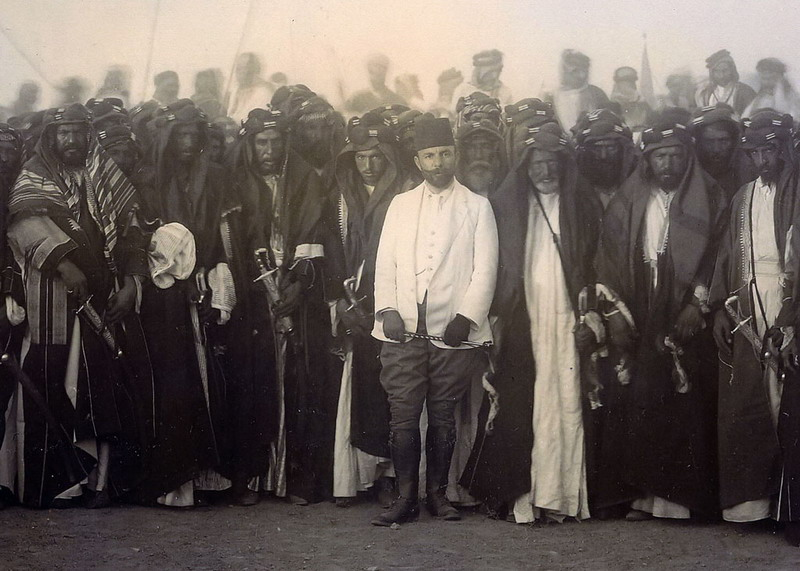
Djemal Pasha with Anazzah tribal leaders, celebrating the completion of the al-Hindya dam on the Euphrates river near al-Hilla, south of Baghdad.

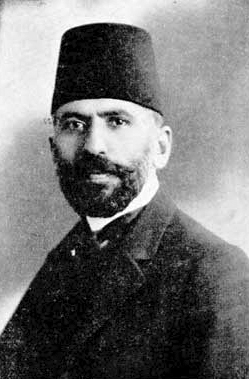
Süleyman Nazif

=== 1831–1902 ===
Person	Time as governor
Ali Rıza Pasha	1831–1842
Najeb Pasha	1842–1849
Abdul-Karim Pasha	1849–1850
Mohamed Wajeh Pasha	1850–1851
Mehmed Namık Pasha	1851–1852
Rashid Pasha	1852–1857
Omar Pasha	1858–1859
Mustafa Nuri Pasha	1859–1861
Ahmed Tawfiq Pasha	1861
Mehmed Namık Pasha	1862–1867
Taqialden Pasha	1867–1869
Midhat Pasha	1869–1872
Mehmed Rauf Pasha bin Abdi Pasha	1872–1873
Radif Pasha	1873–1875
Abdel Rahman Pasha	1875–1877
Akif Pasha	1877–1878
Qadri Pasha	1878
AbdelRahman Pasha	1879–1880
Taqialden Pasha	1880–1887
Mustafa Asim Pasha	1887–1889
Sırrı Pasha	1890–1891
Hassan Pasha	1891–1896
Atteallah Pasha Kawakeby	1896–1899
Namık Pasha	1899–1902

=== 1902–1917 ===
Person	Time as governor
Ahmed Fayzi Pasha	1902–1904
Abdulwahab Pasha	1904–1905
Abdulmajeed Pasha	1905–1906
Abu Bakir Hazem Pasha	1907–1908
Nadim I Pasha	1908
Najemaldeen Beg	1908–1909
Mohamed Fadil Pasha	1909
Shawket Pasha	1909–1910
Nazım Pasha	1910–1911
Youssef Agah Pasha	1911
Djemal Pasha	1911–1912
Ali Redha Pasha	1912
Mohamed Zaki Pasha	1912–1913
Mohamed Fadil Pasha	1913–1914
Süleyman Nazif Pasha	1914–1915
Nurialdeen Pasha	1915
Khalil Pasha	1916–1917

== Sources ==
- Taner, Melis (2020). "Illustrated Manuscripts Attributed to Baghdad". Caught in a whirlwind: a cultural history of Ottoman Baghdad as reflected in its illustrated manuscripts. Leiden; Boston: Brill. ISBN 978-9004412699.

== See also ==
- History of Baghdad 1638-1704
- History of Baghdad 1831-1917
- Mamluk dynasty of Iraq
- Ottoman Iraq
- List of Safavid governors of Baghdad
