= List of Safavid governors of Baghdad =

This is a list of Safavid governors (walis) of Baghdad, ruling over Iraq.

- Looe looe Hussain (1508–1515)
- Fanharez (1515–1524)
- Mohamed Khan Bin Sharafaldeen (1529–1533)
- Tekkelu Muhammad Sultan Khan (1533–1534)
- Safyaldeen Qaly Khan (1623–1631)
- Bektash Khan Mirimanidze (1631–1638)
- Yaftash Khan (1641–1638)

== See also ==
- List of Ottoman governors of Baghdad
