= Siege of Hatvan (1594) =

- Part of the Long Turkish War
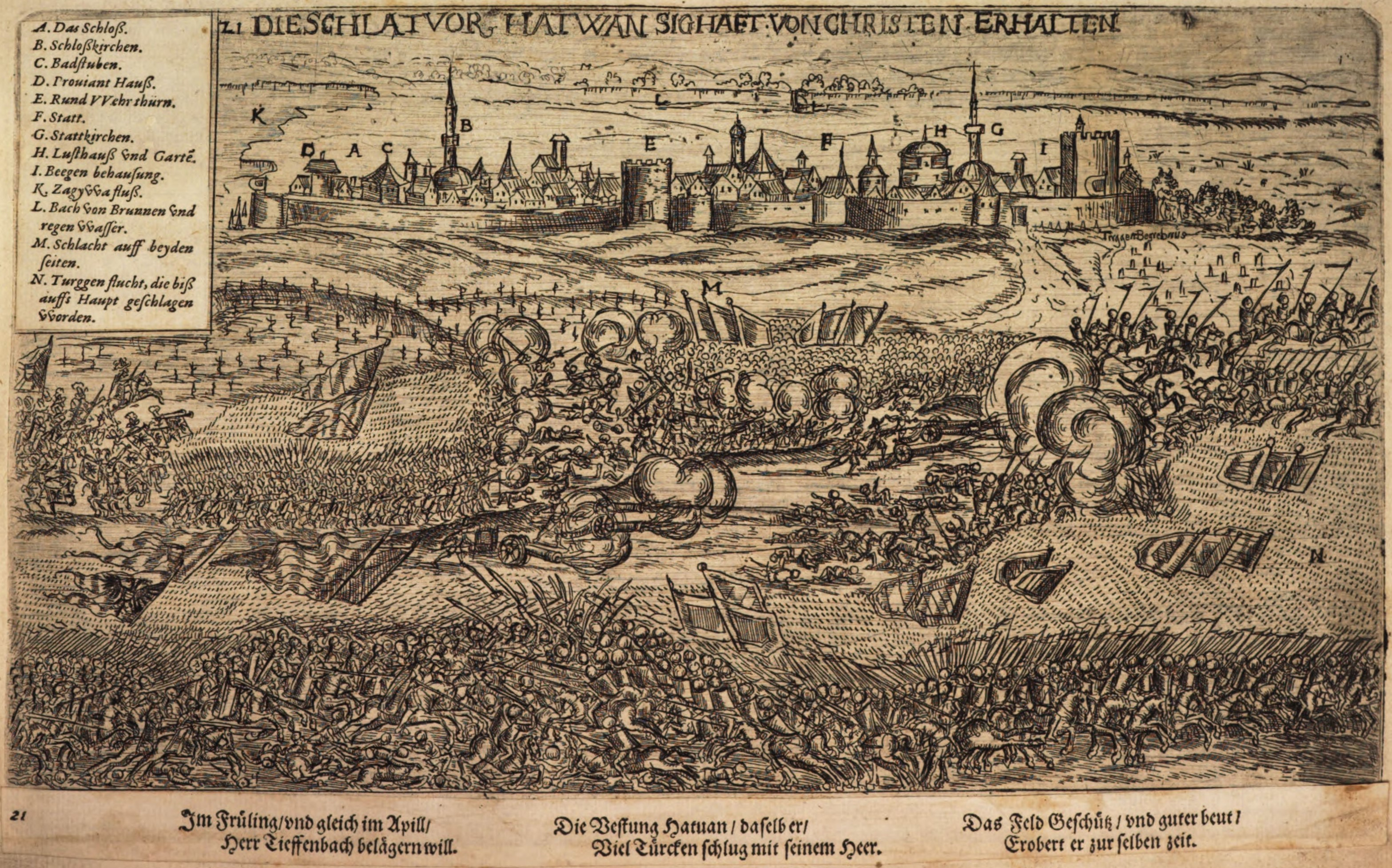
- Depicition of the siege by Wilhelm Peter Zimmermann (1603)
Date	20 April – 2 July 1594
Location	Hatvan
Result	Ottoman victory

Belligerents
Ottoman Empire	Holy Roman Empire

Commanders and leaders
Sokulluzade Hasan Pasha	Christoph von Teuffenbach

Strength
15,000	30,000

Casualties and losses
3,000–4,000	1,000–2,000

The siege of Hatvan was a siege that took place in 1594. The German army, under the command of Christoph von Teuffenbach, Governor of Styria of the Holy Roman Empire, was defeated and the siege was lifted before Hatvan, which they besieged between 20 April and 2 July 1594.

== Background ==
In the first year of the war between the Ottoman Empire and the Holy Roman Empire, which began in 1593, the sides occupied some minor fortresses on both sides, while in the spring of 1594, two German armies laid siege to the important Ottoman fortresses Esztergom and Hatvan. The army besieging Hatvan was led by the Governor-General of Styria Christoph von Teuffenbach, and Esztergom was led by Emperor Holstein II. Rudolf's brother Archduke Matthias (future Holy Roman Emperor) was in command.

== Siege ==
The German army arrived in front of Hatvan Castle on April 20, 1594. On May 5, Vizier Koca Sinan Pasha set out from Belgrade at the head of his army with the aim of liberating Esztergom and Hatvan. When the army arrived at Budin, Sinan Pasha (his son) sent a corps of 10,000 to 13,000 soldiers under the command of Rumelia Governor Sinanpaşazade Mehmet Pasha and Budin Governor Sokulluzade Hasan Pasha to Hatvan.

While the German army was besieging Hatvan, it was subjecting the castle to heavy cannon fire, losing 500 to It was raining 1,000, even 1,300 bullets. When the Ottoman aid army approached the front of Hatvan, General von Teuffenbach divided his army into two and launched an attack by adding German infantry to the Hungarian cavalry under the command of Adam Forgaş. The advance unit under the command of Sokulluzade Hasan Pasha faked a retreat against the numerical superiority of the German army and brought the German and Hungarian soldiers within artillery range. However, Sinanpaşazade Mehmet Pasha, who came from behind, interpreted this operation as the defeat of his advance units and retreated to Budin. In the battle, the Ottoman army lost 3,000 to 4,000, while the German army lost 1,000 to 2,000. In response, Hatvan Dizdarı Sarıalioğlu Tiryaki Arslan Bey, seeing that General von Teuffenbach had left a weaker unit in front of the castle to continue the siege, launched the sortie operation. General von Teuffenbach, concerned about being caught between two fires, lifted the siege and retreated in disorder, suffering heavy losses and leaving all his artillery behind.

== Aftermath ==
Hatvan was won by Hatvan Dizdarı Sarıalioğlu Tiryaki Arslan Bey, but Koca Sinan Pasha highlighted his son Mehmed Pasha in the zafername he sent to Istanbul. Thereupon, Mehmed Pasha was also given the rank of Vizier.

The Ottoman army, which saved Hatvan and Esztergom from siege, continued its forward movement and captured the castles of Tata on July 17, 1594, and St. Marton on July 29, and conquered the siege of Győr on July 31 (after the victory in the battle on September 9–10) on September 27.
