= Hadim Yusuf Pasha =

Hadım Yusuf Pasha
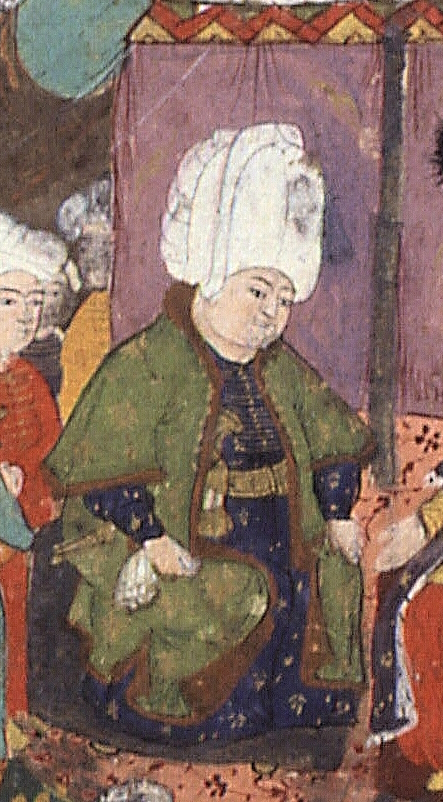
- Hadim Yusuf Pasha (detail) visiting Kurdish tribes in Jizra, in 1602-03 (BNF, Turc 127)

Governor of Van
- In office 1598–1599
- Monarch: Mehmed III

Governor of Baghdad
- In office 1605–1606
- Monarch: Ahmed I
- Preceded by: Mehmed Pasha, son of Sinan Pasha
- Succeeded by: Tavilzade Muhammed (rebel)

Muhafız (keeper) of Üsküdar
- In office 1607–1608
- Monarch: Ahmed I

Personal details
- Died: 1614 Istanbul

Hadim Yusuf Pasha, or simply Yusuf Pasha (Ottoman Turkish: خادم یوسف پاشا; Turkish: Hadım Yusuf Paşa, died 1614), also Çerkes Ağa Yusuf Paşa, was an Ottoman governor of Baghdad in 1605–1606. Yusuf Pasha was a eunuch ("Hadim") and a Circassian by birth ("Çerkes"). The title "Hadim" literarly means "servant" or "attendant", but its Ottoman connotation in the 16-17th century was "eunuch". Yusuf Pasha was also mentioned as a eunuch by the Portuguese adventurer Teixeira, and this is confirmed by his lack of facial hair and corpulence in the miniatures of Muḥliṣī's travelogue.

Yusuf Pasha occupied various posts, including governor of Van (1598–99), governor of Baghdad (1605–1606), and muhafız (keeper) of Üsküdar (1607–1608). In 1608, he was sent to Bursa to suppress a rebellion led by Kalenderoğlu.

== Governor of Baghdad ==
In 1602, Yusuf Pasha was sent from Istanbul to assert an Ottoman presence in the disputed town of Basra, where he held the post of governor despite the presence of a local power-holder named Afrasiyab Paşa. His travel from Istanbul to Basra was documented in his travelogue Sefernāme.

In 1604 Yusuf Pasha was then was dispatched from Basra to Baghdad, to replace the current Baghdad governor Mehmed Pasha (1602-1604), son of Sinan Pasha, and arrived at the end of 1604. Yusuf Pasha was mentioned by Pedro Teixeira, who visited Baghdad in 1604, and who explained that the newly arrived governor came from Basra and was "called Issuf or Iuçef Paşa, a eunuch, and a Xerquez [Circassian] by birth." He also mentioned that the governor recently received the title of vizier.

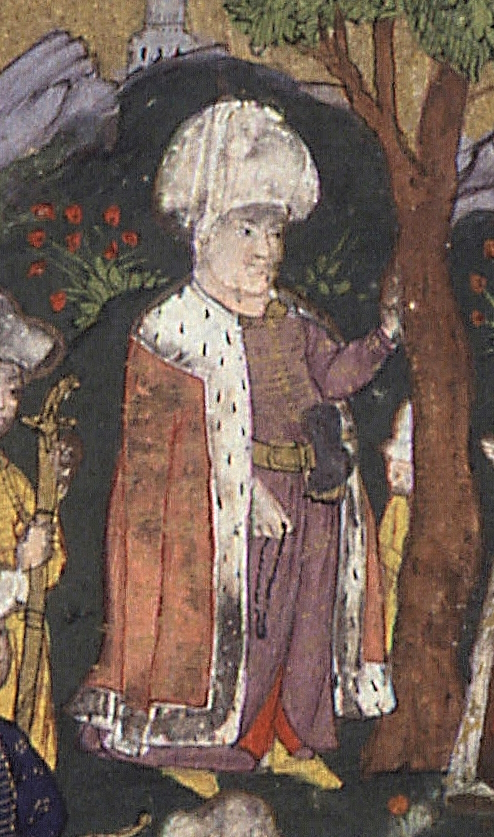
Yusuf Paşa (detail) visiting the Pond of Abraham. Sefernāme of Muhlisi, Bibliothèque nationale de France, Paris, Turc 127, fol. 17b.

The Pasha had come lately from Baçora, which he had left, by the desert route, three days before our arrival there. He was called Issuf or luçef Pasha, a eunuch, and a Xerquez by nation. His office is worth yearly 200,000 sequins, or about 250,000 ducats, whereof he may expend at most thirty or forty thousand. This is the value of it in time of peace, but in war-time he makes what he pleases. When we were now set upon our departure, there came to this Pasha fifteen capgis (porters) from Constantinople, who are gate-wards of the Grand Turk, bringing him the title of Wazir, and continuance in his government for seven years, with a robe of brocade, a sword, and a golden chain-bridle: things that the Turk is wont to send to such as he raises to the like dignity.

— The travels of Pedro Teixeira.

After Baghdad, Yusuf Pasha became muhafız (keeper) of Üsküdar (1607–1608). In 1608, he was sent to Bursa to suppress a rebellion led by Kalenderoğlu. A few years later, he is recorded in the retinue of Sultan Ahmed I during a hunting party in Edirne, and is said to have had a household of three hundred members.

Yusuf Pasha died in 1614. His properties and vizierate were transferred to Kalender Pasha, the second treasurer and building supervisor of the "Blue Mosque" (Sultan Ahmed Mosque).

== Travelogue from Istanbul to Basra (1602–1603) ==
Yusuf Pasha is relatively well known through Ottoman accounts and miniatures relating his travels in Anatolia and Iraq, particularly a Sefernāme (“Book of a Journey” or “Travelogue”) by an artist named Muhlisi who accompanied him in his travels, and who completed the account in 1605–06 in Baghdad. Yusuf Pasha is especially described as he visited whirling dervishes in Konya, or the shrine of Mawlana Jalal al-Din Rumi and the tombs of Seljuq rulers in the years 1602–1603. In his perigrinations and military conflicts during his tenure in Baghdad, he is described as valorous, just, and pious leader, acting under difficult circumstances.

Among the Ottoman governors of Baghdad, only Sokulluzade Hasan Pasha is also known to have commissioned illustrated manuscripts, which were significantly more ambitious and rather belonged to the genre of universal histories.

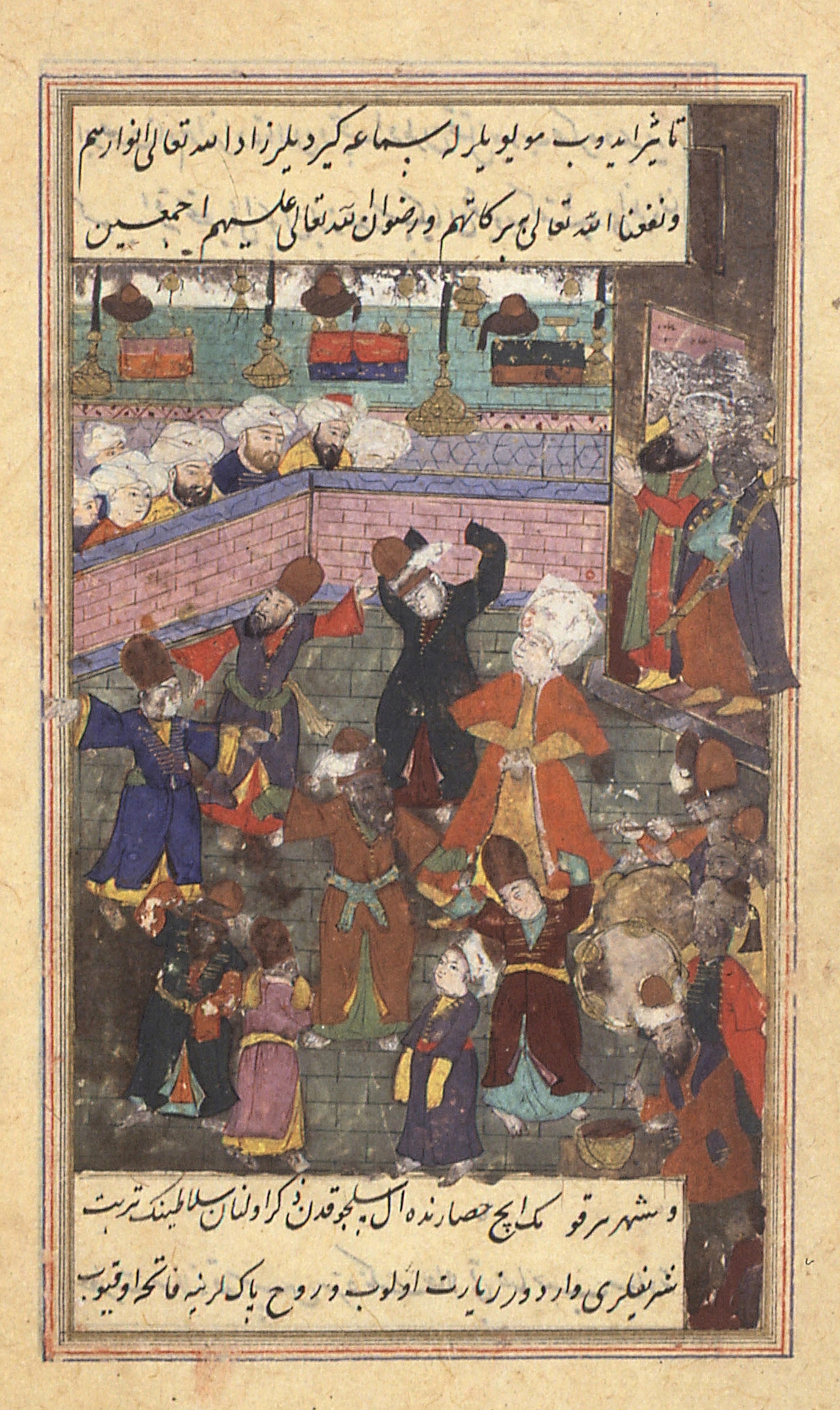
Yusuf Paşa among whirling dervishes in Konya (Shrine of Rumi)

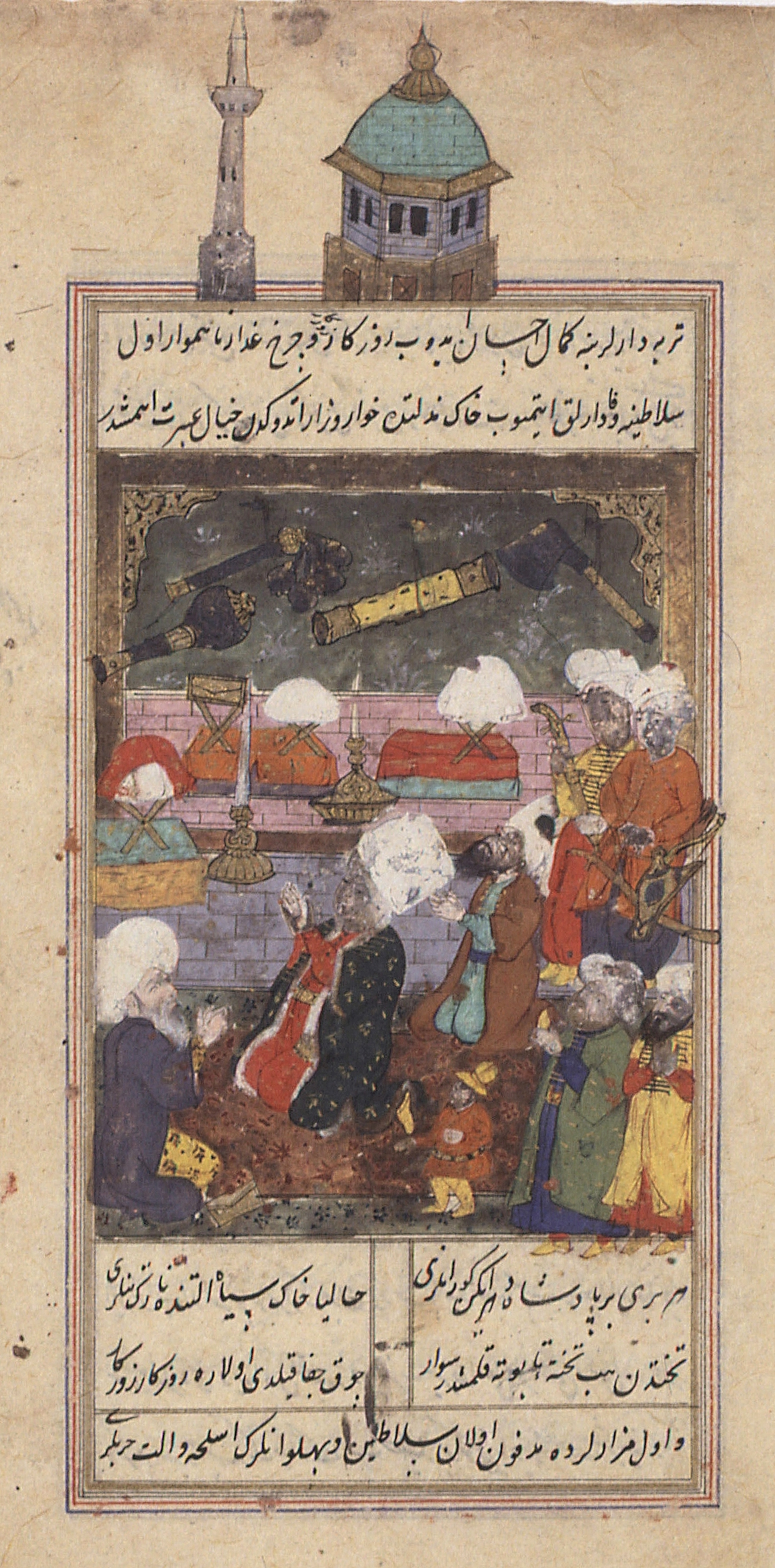
Yusuf Paşa visiting the tombs of Rum Seljuq rulers in Konya (Alâeddin Mosque)

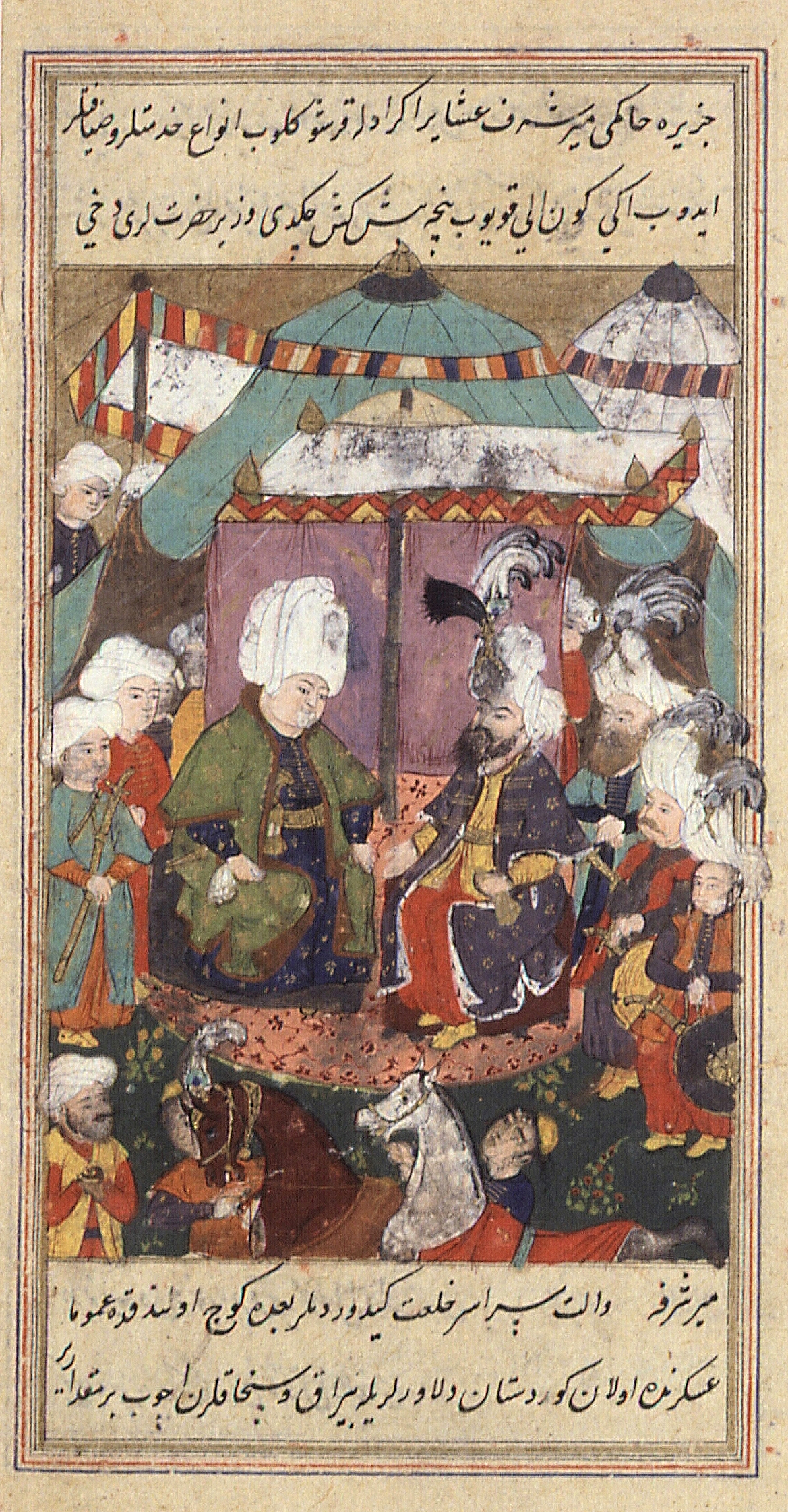
Yusuf Paşa visiting Kurdish prince Mir Sheref in Jizra.

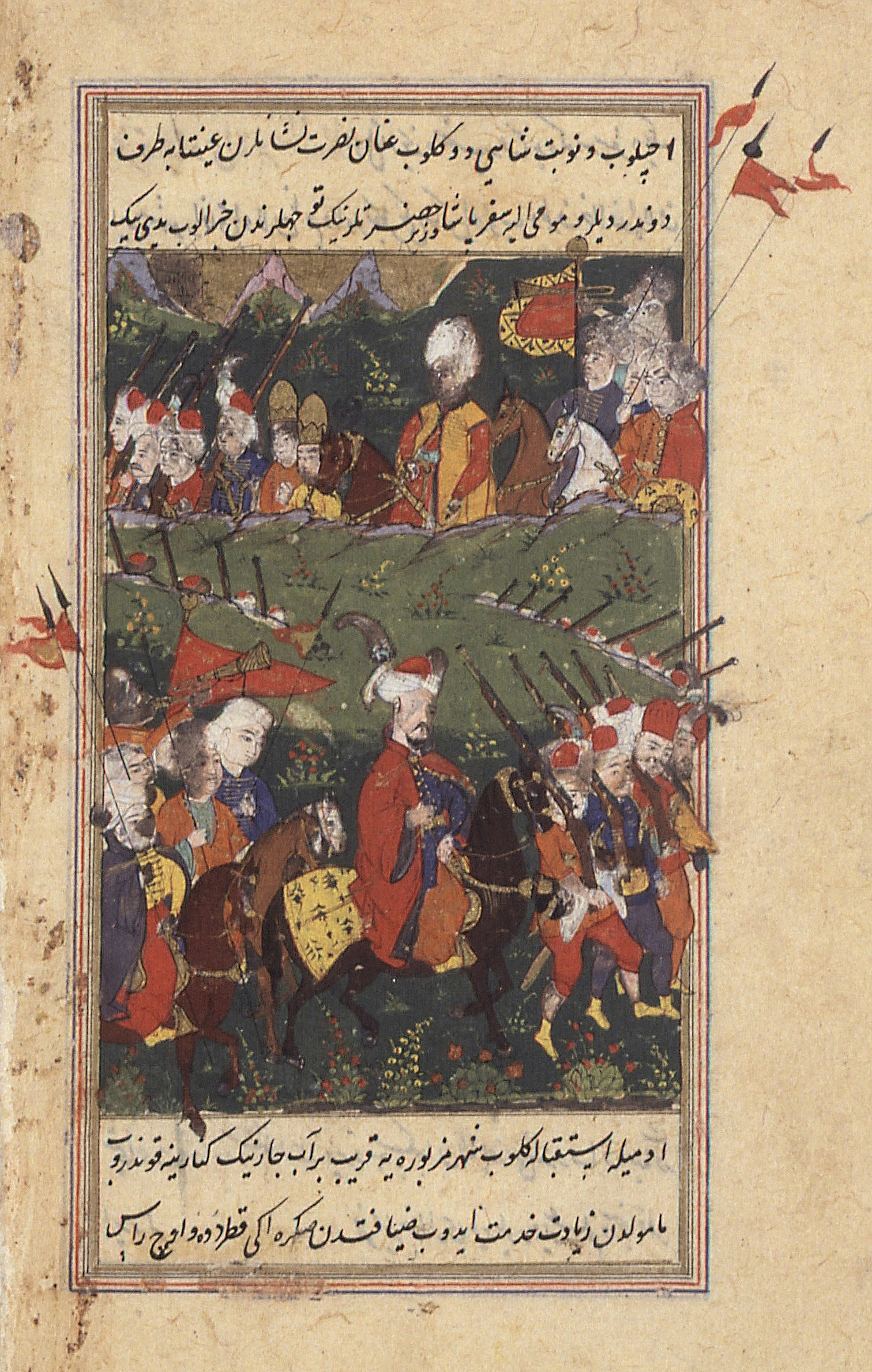
Yusuf Paşa inspecting troops

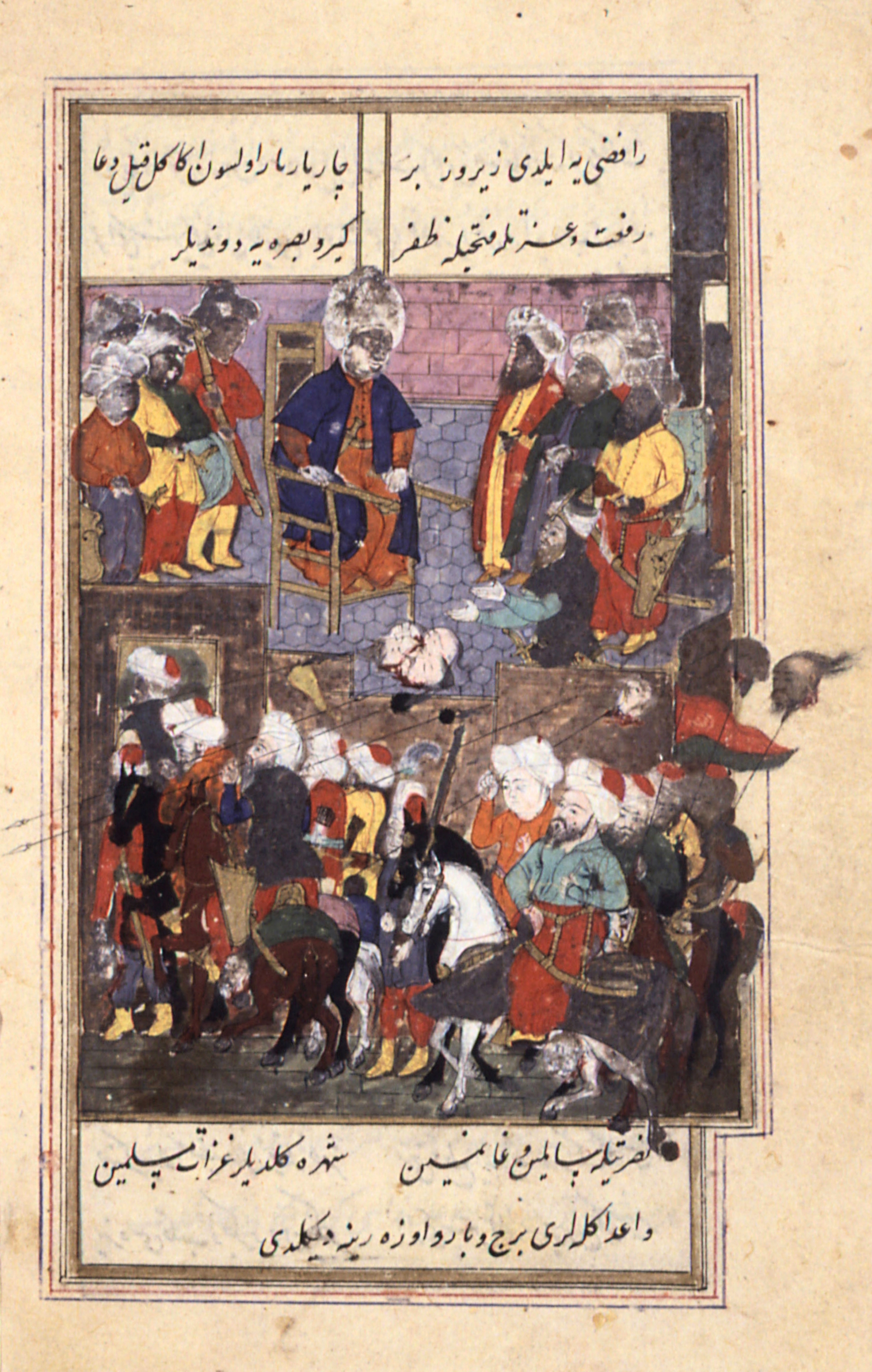
Severed heads of the rebels brought before Yusuf Paşa.

== See also ==
- List of Ottoman governors of Baghdad

== Sources ==
- Taner, Melis (2020). "Illustrated Manuscripts Attributed to Baghdad". Caught in a whirlwind: a cultural history of Ottoman Baghdad as reflected in its illustrated manuscripts. Leiden; Boston: Brill. ISBN 978-9004412699.
- Taner, Melis (14 October 2019). Caught in a Whirlwind: A Cultural History of Ottoman Baghdad as Reflected in Its Illustrated Manuscripts. BRILL. ISBN 978-90-04-41280-4.
- Teixeira, Pedro (1902). The travels of Pedro Teixeira; with his "Kings of Harmuz," and extracts from his "Kings of Persia.". London, Printed for the Hakluyt Society.
