= Mir Sheref =

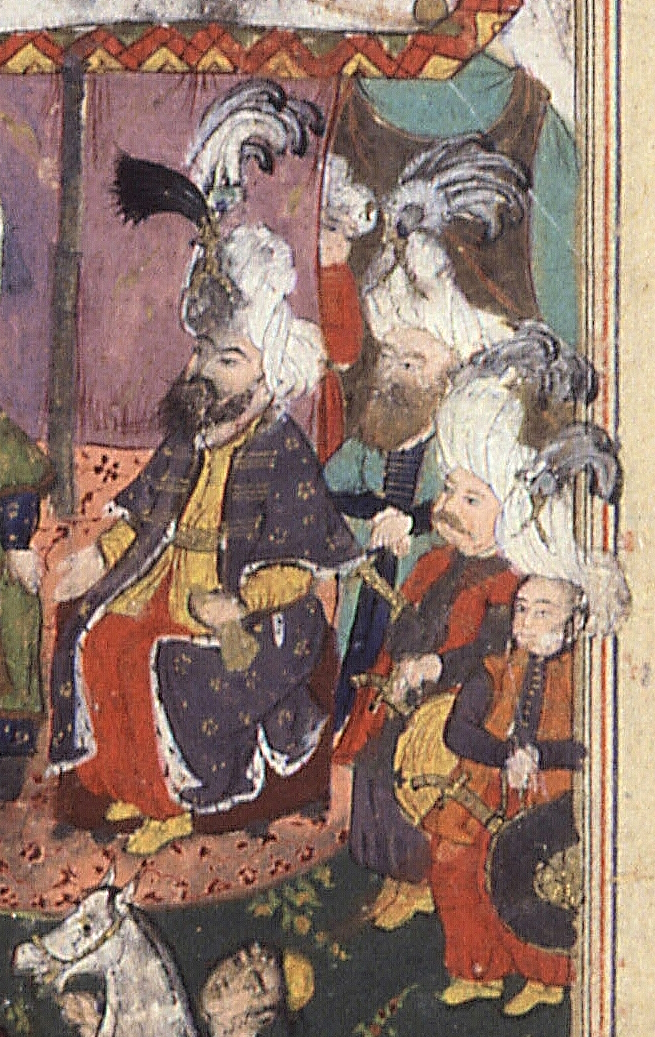
Eyewitness depiction of Kurdish prince Mir Sheref and his retinue in Jizra in 1602-03 (BNF, Turc 127).

Mir Sheref, also Mir Şeref, was a Kurdish prince of the regions of Jizra in the 16th-17th century. He was recorded circa 1602–1603 in a travelogue of the peregrinations of the Ottoman official Hadim Yusuf Pasha.

Mir Sheref's daughter is reported to have married Nasuh Pasha, an Ottoman statesman of Albanian origin. This apparently brought Nasuh Pasha great wealth and power, and this alliance supported his involvement in an expedition in Persia in 1606.

== Sources ==
- Taner, Melis (14 October 2019). Caught in a Whirlwind: A Cultural History of Ottoman Baghdad as Reflected in Its Illustrated Manuscripts. BRILL. ISBN 978-90-04-41280-4.
