= Safavid Hamadan =

Province in western Safavid Iran

Safavid Hamadan Velāyat-e Hamadān
- Province
- Country: Safavid Iran
- Capital: Hamadan

The province of Hamadan (Persian: استان همدان), also known as Qalamru-ye Ali Shukr, was a western province of Safavid Iran and part of the Persian Iraq region. It was created in 1503 by Shah Ismail I (r. 1501–1524) after his conquest of the area. From 1653/54 to 1694, it functioned as a khasseh (crown land). It was composed of the administrative jurisdictions of Garrus, Harsin, Hastajoft, Kalhor, Khvar-Semnan, Ray, and Saveh-Haveh.

== List of governors ==
This is a list of the known figures who governed the Hamadan province.

Year	Name
1503	Dedeh Beg
1508	Amir Beg Mowsellu
1509	Yegan Beg Ustajlu
1515–1524	Qarajeh Soltan Tekkelu
1543	Abdollah Khan Ustajlu
1544	Mohammad Soltan Alayinoghli
1545–1555	Cheragh Soltan Gerampa Ustajlu
1561	Beyram Khan ibn Seyf Ali Beg Baharlu
1561–1568	Mohammadi Khan ibn Amir Khan Mowselu
1568–1573	Amir Khan Mowselu Torkman ibn Mohammadi Khan
1573–1576	Fulad Khalifeh-ye Rumlu or Shamlu
1577	Amir Khan Mowsellu Torkman
1577–1584	Vali Beg [Soltan] Tekkelu ibn Ali Soltan Sharaf al-Din-oghlu
1586	Pir Ghey ibn Khan Ustajlu
1586	Shahverdi Khalifeh-ye Shamlu
1586	Vali Khan Tekkelu
1588	Qurkhoms Khan Rumlu
1589	Budaq Khan Chegani
1589	Qurkhoms Khan Shamlu
1590	Tahmaspqoli Soltan Arashlu Afshar
1590	Hoseynqoli Khan Arashlu Afshar
1591	Hasan Ali ibn Budaq Khan Cheghani
1592	Oghurlu Soltan Bayat
1596	Hoseyn Ali Khan Cheghani
1596–1611	[Qara] Hasan Khan Ustajlu
1611–1623	Safiqoli Khan
1623–1626	Hoseyn Khan Chavoshlu Ustajlu
1637	Pir Ghey Ustajlu
1643	Bektash Khan
1648–1649	Mortezaqoli Khan
1675–1683	Abdol-Qasem Khan
1691	Saru Khan Sahandlu
1694	Abbas Khan Ziyadoghlu Qajar
1714	Safiqoli Khan
1723–1724	Abu'l-Qasem Khan

== Sources ==
- Floor, Willem (2008). Titles and Emoluments in Safavid Iran: A Third Manual of Safavid Administration, by Mirza Naqi Nasiri. Mage Publishers. ISBN 978-1933823232.
