= Sokulluzade Hasan Pasha =

Ottoman statesman (d. 1602)

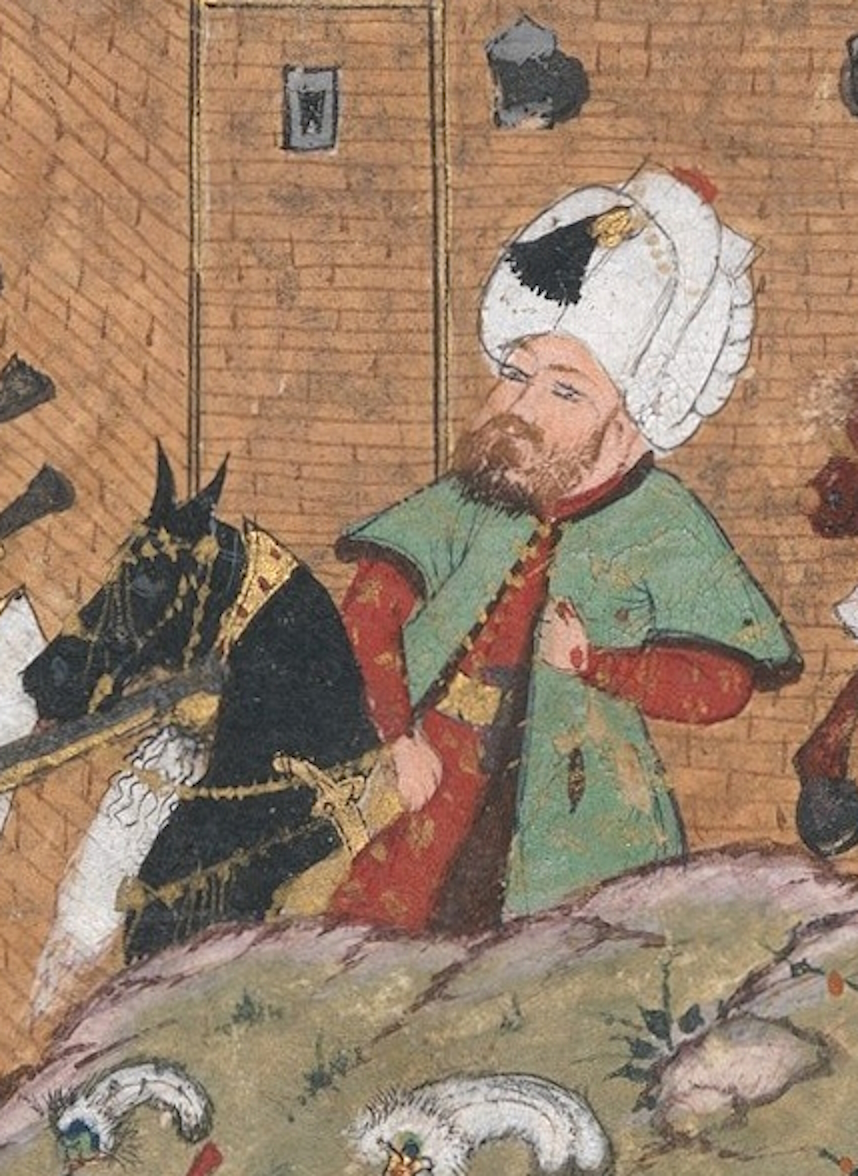
Sokulluzade Hasan Pasha entering Istanbul with the hostage Safavid Prince Haydar Mirza in 1590. Divan of Mahmud Abd al-Baki (1590–95).

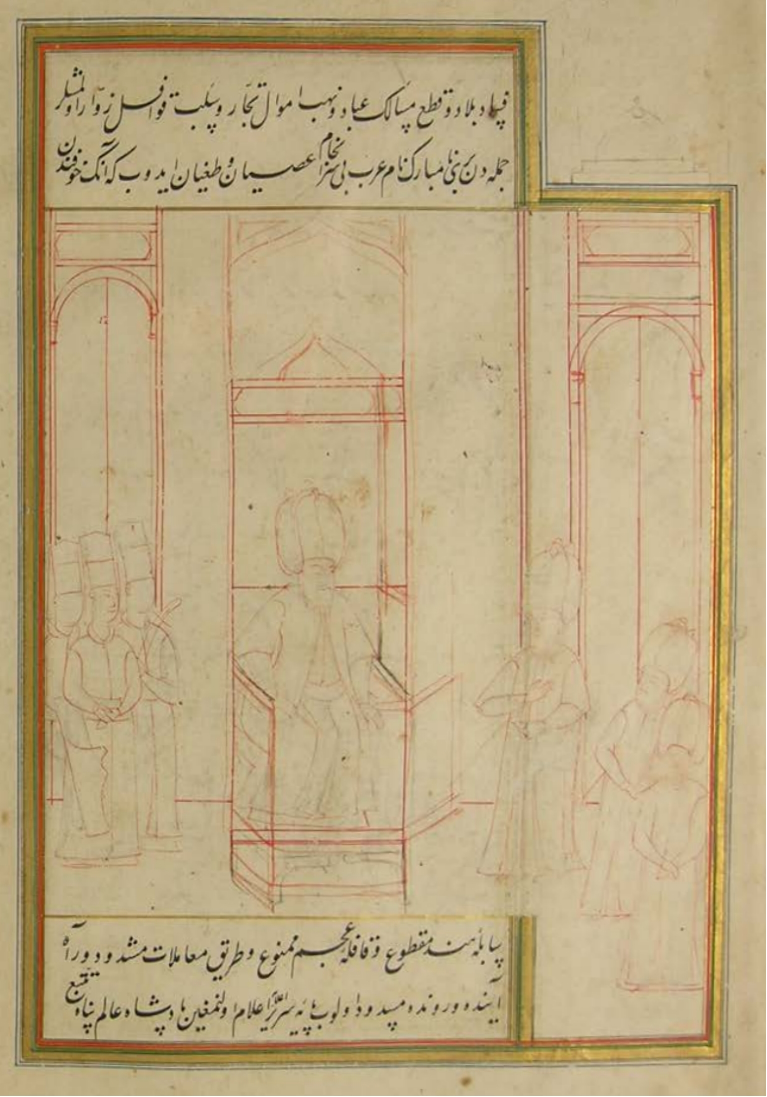
The meeting of Vizier Hasan Paşa and Mehmed III. Cāmiʿü’s-siyer of Muhammed Tahir, Topkapı Palace Museum Library, Istanbul, in H. 1369, fol. 13a.

Sokulluzade Hasan Pasha (died 1602) was an Ottoman officer, governor and vizier.

He was the eldest son of the Ottoman statesman of Serb ethnicity Sokullu Mehmet Pasha. Together with his brother Kurd Bey, he participated to the Siege of Szigetvár (1566) as an officer under the command of his father Sokullu Mehmet Pasha.

On 9 November 1571, he was appointed as the sanjak-bey of the Bosnia Eyalet. On 22 February 1572, he was appointed the beylerbey (governor) of Aleppo. On 31 January 1573, he became the governor of the Diyarbekir Eyalet, where he worked on providing oarsmen for the navy that was bound for Tunis and ammunition for a planned conquest of Bahrain, collection of tariffs and the elimination of the tribes that lived as brigands. He held this office until he was replaced by Özdemiroğlu Osman Pasha on 2 June 1576. It is not clear whether he ever became the governor of Erzurum.

He was the governor of the Damascus Eyalet in 1577. He was tasked with the defense of Erzurum in the Ottoman-Safavid War in 1578, but this mission was cancelled as the defense of Damascus was considered more important. He waited in Damascus until troops arrived from Egypt and moved to Erzurum, where the army gathered, in March 1579. He undertook the construction of one of the bastions of the fortifications while he was in Kars. He then led a mission with the governors of Tbilisi and Diyarbekir to relieve Tbilisi of its shortage of supplies and food under the siege. He succeeded in this mission and returned to Damascus.

He later rejoined the army under Koca Sinan Pasha. On 18 October 1580, while he was in the frontline, he was made the governor of Diyarbekir again but the decision was swiftly reversed and he remained in his position in Damascus. While briefly sent to Baghdad on 14 November 1580, he remained the governor of Damascus and attended the circumcision feast of Prince Mehmed, future Sultan Mehmed III as such in 1582. In 1583, he rejoined the war against the Safavids under Serdar Ferhad Pasha, contributed to the conquest of Yerevan and the building of a new fort there. With the governors of Diyarbekir and Karaman, he helped catch Kara Veli, a brigand that attacked the army.

On 6 January 1584, he replaced Üveys Pasha as the governor of Aleppo.

He participated to the Ottoman–Safavid War (1578–1590), and in 1590 became governor-general of Damascus again, then of Anatolia in Kütahya. In 1590, he received in Istanbul the hostage Safavid Prince Haydar Mirza.

Sokolluzade Hasan Paşa was later Governor of Baghdad from 1598, replacing the deceased Elvendzāde ʿAlī Paşa.

Sokulluzade Hasan Pasha fought against the Celali rebellions. He defeated Karayazıcı in July 1601, and Karayazıcı died of natural causes near Canik in 1602. In 1602 he was besieged by the Celalis in Tokat and killed by the men of Deli Hasan, brother of Karayazıcı. Other sources give a date of 1604.

While in Baghdad, he is known for sponsoring various historical manuscripts such as the Cāmiʿü’s-siyer of Muhammed Tahir.

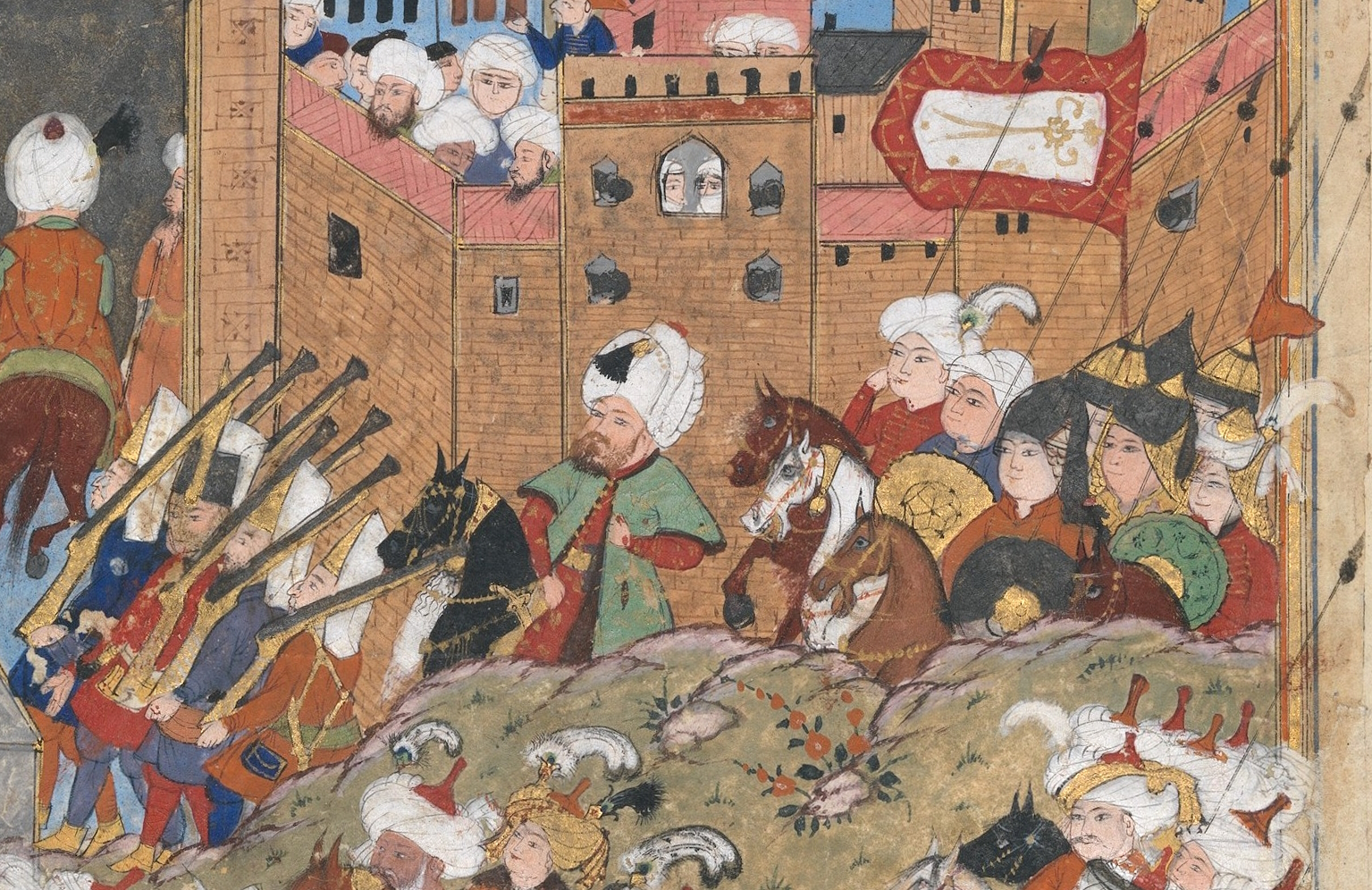
Sokulluzade Hasan Pasha (center) leading in troops with a Zulfiqar Ottoman flag in 1590. Divan of Mahmud Abd al-Baki, 1590–95.

== See also ==
- List of Ottoman governors of Baghdad

== Sources ==
- "Sokulluzade Hasan Paşa". İslam Ansiklopedisi. Vol. 37. Türk Diyanet Vakfı. 2009. pp. 366–368.
- Akdağ, Mustafa (1958). "1596 Sirasinda Osmanli Devletinin Umumî Durumu" (PDF). Ankara University Journal of the Faculty of Language, History and Geography. 16 (1). Ankara University: 53–107. Archived from the original (PDF) on 28 February 2013.
- Casale, Sinem Arcak (2023). Gifts in the Age of Empire. Ottoman-Safavid Cultural Exchange, 1500–1639. The University of Chicago Press. ISBN 978-0226820422.
- Faroqhi, Suraiya (1992). "Political Activity among Ottoman Taxpayers and the Problem of Sultanic Legitimation (1570-1650)". Journal of the Economic and Social History of the Orient. 35 (1). Brill Publishers: 1–39. doi:10.2307/3632686. JSTOR 3632686.
- Finkel, Caroline (19 July 2012). Osman's Dream. John Murray Press. ISBN 978-1-84854-785-8.
- Taner, Melis (2020). "Illustrated Manuscripts Attributed to Baghdad". Caught in a whirlwind: a cultural history of Ottoman Baghdad as reflected in its illustrated manuscripts. Leiden; Boston: Brill. ISBN 978-9004412699.
- Tezcan, Baki (13 September 2010). The Second Ottoman Empire: Political and Social Transformation in the Early Modern World. Cambridge University Press. ISBN 978-0-521-51949-6.
- Zararsiz, Abdullah (30 June 2021). "Osmanlı Kroniklerinde Sokollu Mehmed Paşa ve Sokoloviç Ailesi". Mediterranean Journal of Humanities (10). doi:10.13114/MJH.2021.568.
