= Melikov =

Coat of Arms - Princes Melikishvili

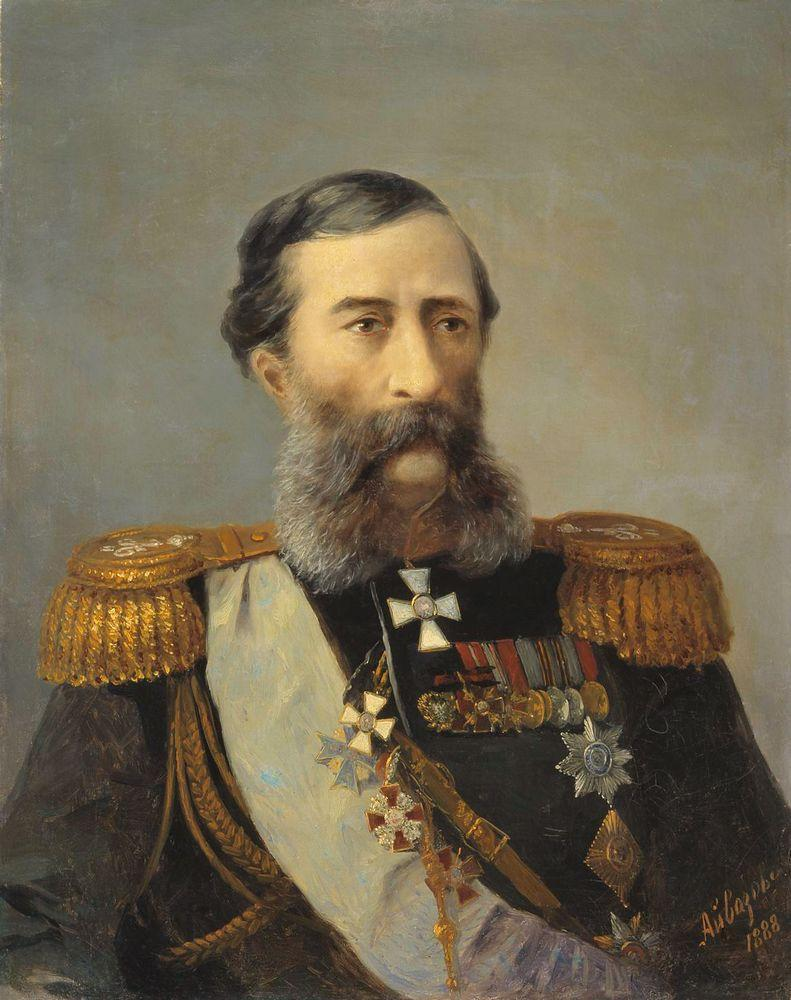
Prince of Lori, Count Loris-Melikov by I. AIVAZOVSKY

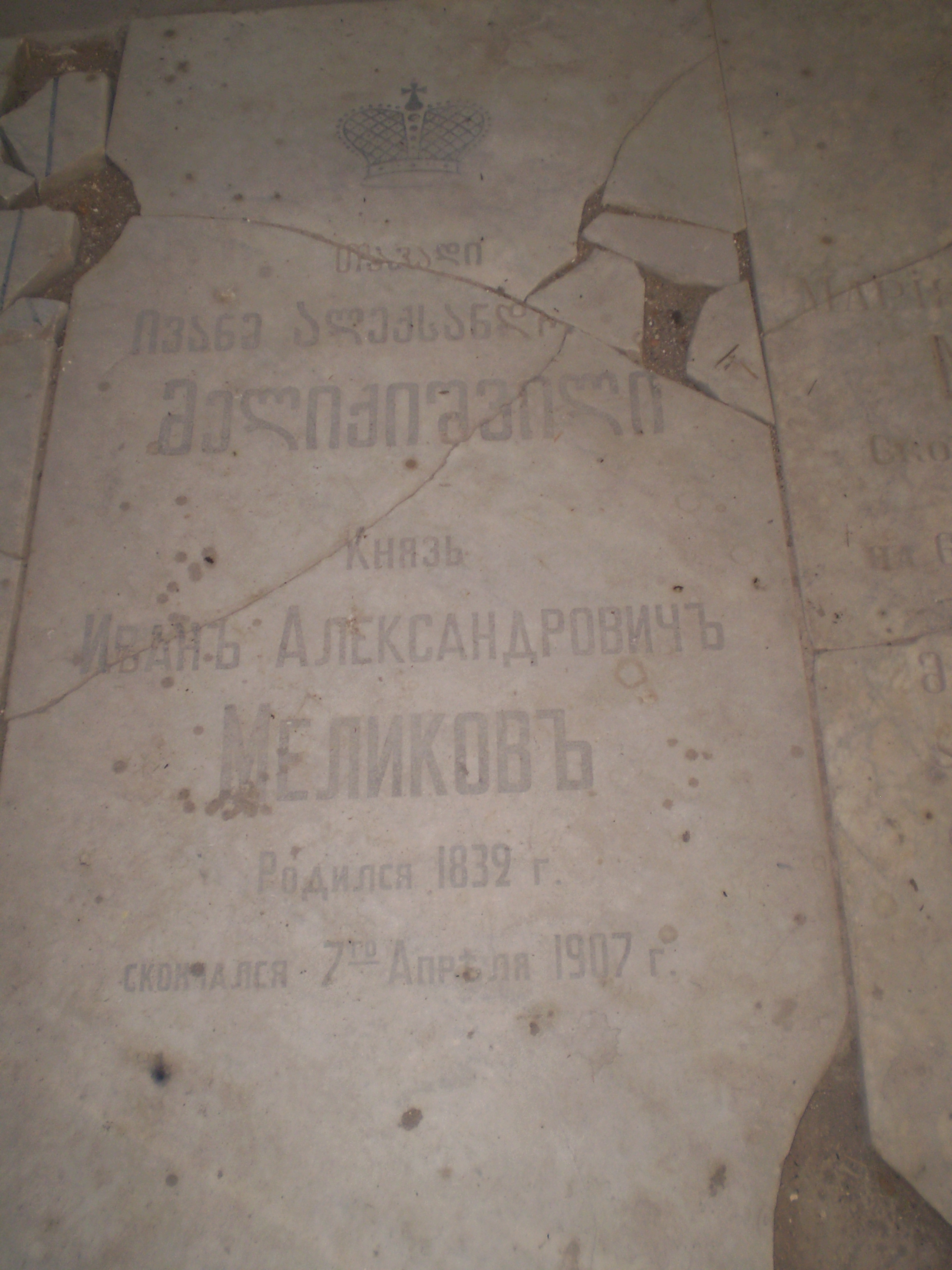
Tomb of Prince Ivan Aleksandrovich Melikov inside the Holy Virgin church of Akhtala monastery.

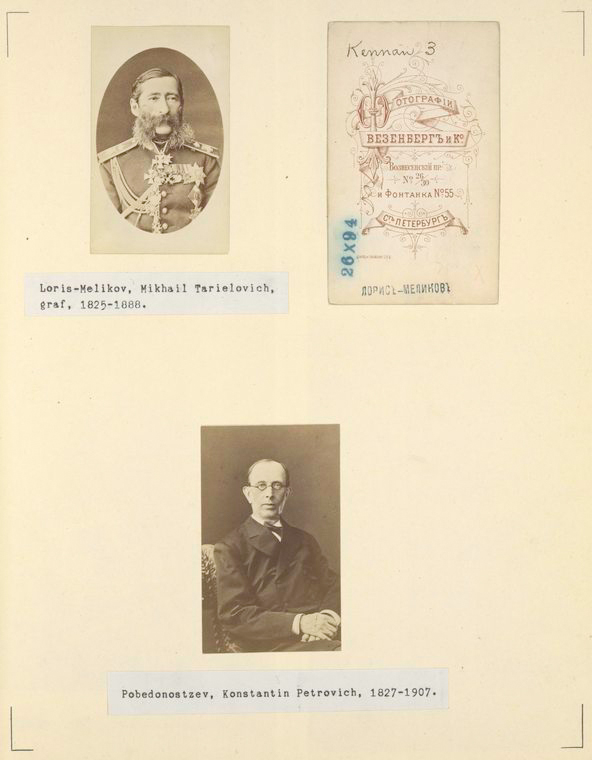

The House of Melikov (Russian: Меликов, Armenian: Մելիքով), the Russified version of Armenian last name Melikyan (Armenian: Մելիքյան) was an Armenian noble family in the Kingdom of Georgia and later in the Russian Empire.

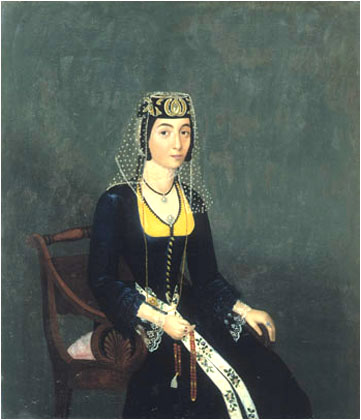
Portrait of a Melikishvili woman by Hakob Hovnatanyan, The Georgian Museum of Fine Arts, Tbilisi.

The family descended from an Armenian nobleman named Malek Miriman who hailed from Somkhiti, had converted to Islam and was enfeoffed with the melikdom of Lori by the Safavid Iranian king Tahmasp I (r. 1524–1576). Under the Safavids, the family continued to rise to prominence, and they were known as the Mirimanidze clan/family.

Later, the family returned to Christianity (Georgian Orthodox) and were confirmed as Princes Melikishvili (Georgian: მელიქიშვილი) and dukes of Somkhiti.

A branch of this family became Armenian Apostolic and came to be known as Loris-Melikov (Лорис-Меликов), which means Meliks of Lori (Princes of Lori). After the Russian annexation of Georgia, the family was received among the princely nobility (knyaz) of the Russian Empire, and was made famous by General Mikhail Tarielovich Loris-Melikov (1825–88) who was bestowed with the dignity of count in 1878.

== Notable people with the surname ==
- Isa Melikov (born 1980), Azerbaijani composer and producer
- Genia Melikova (1924–2004), ballet dancer of Russian origin
- Grigori Melikov (born 1976), Russian footballer
- Maksuma Melikova (born 1929), Azerbaijani legal scientist
- Mikhail Loris-Melikov (1826–1888), Russian-Armenian statesman
- Yuri Melikov (b. 1997), Armenian-Cypriot singer-songwriter
- Sergey Melikov (b. 1965), governor of Dagestan
