= Elvendzade Ali Pasha =

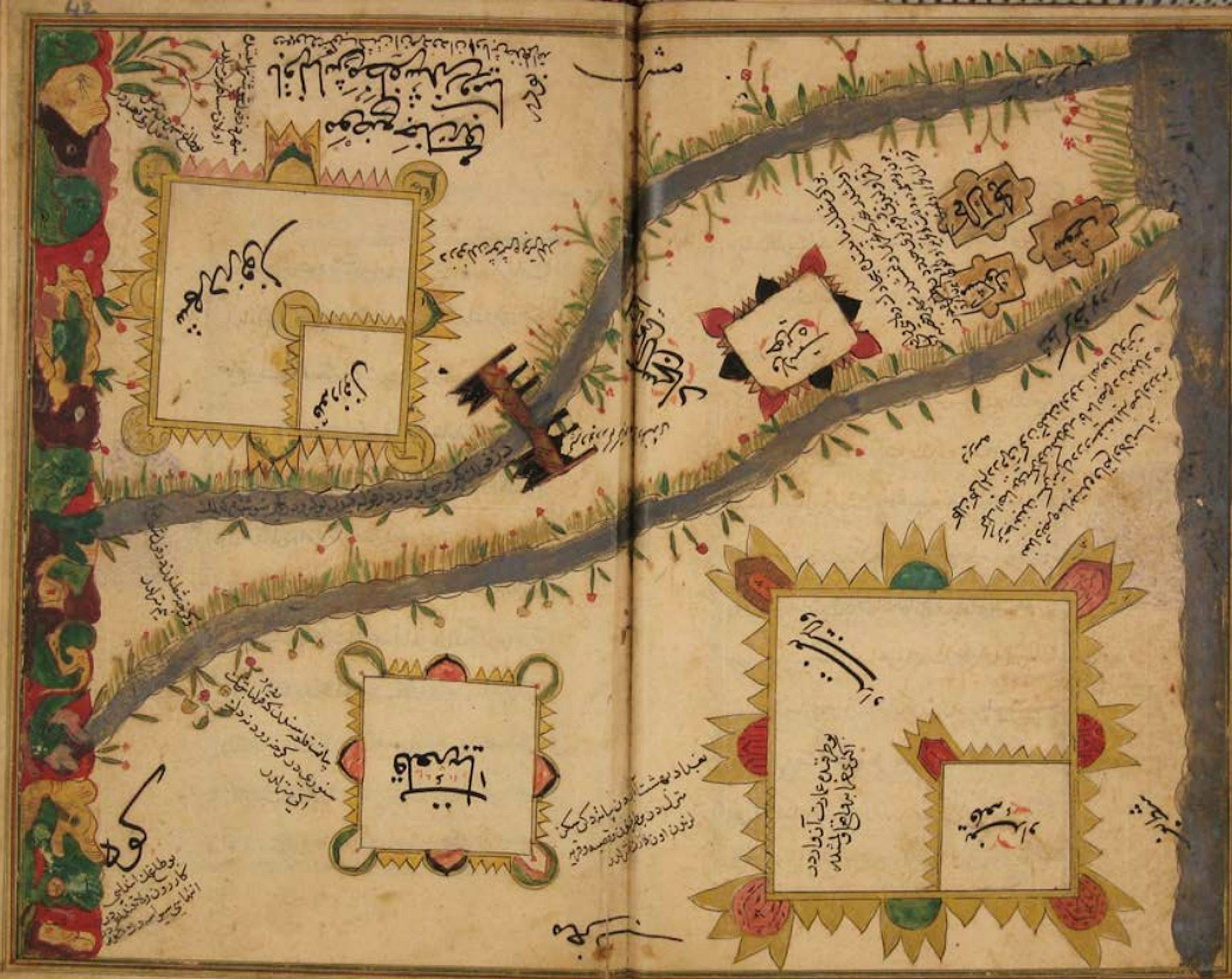
Citadels of Baghdad and Bayat, city and citadel of Dizful, Huveyze, and battleground between the Ottomans and Safavids (in 1583). Ẓafernāme-i ʿĀlī Paşa of Niyazi, Millet Kütüphanesi Ali Emiri Tarih Nu. 396.

Elvendzade Ali Pasha was Ottoman Governor of Baghdad during several periods, in 1574–1576, 1582-1583 and 1597–1598.

A manuscript was created for Elvendzade Ali Pasha by an artist named Niyazi, the Ẓafernāme-i ʿĀlī Paşa (Book of Victory of Ali Pasha), celebrating his successes against the Safavids around Baghdad in 1583, during the Ottoman–Safavid War (1578–1590).

He died in 1598 in battle, and was replaced as Governor of Baghdad by Sokolluzade Hasan Paşa.

== See also ==
- List of Ottoman governors of Baghdad

== Sources ==
- Taner, Melis (2020). "Illustrated Manuscripts Attributed to Baghdad". Caught in a whirlwind: a cultural history of Ottoman Baghdad as reflected in its illustrated manuscripts. Leiden; Boston: Brill. ISBN 978-9004412699.
