= Mirimanidze =

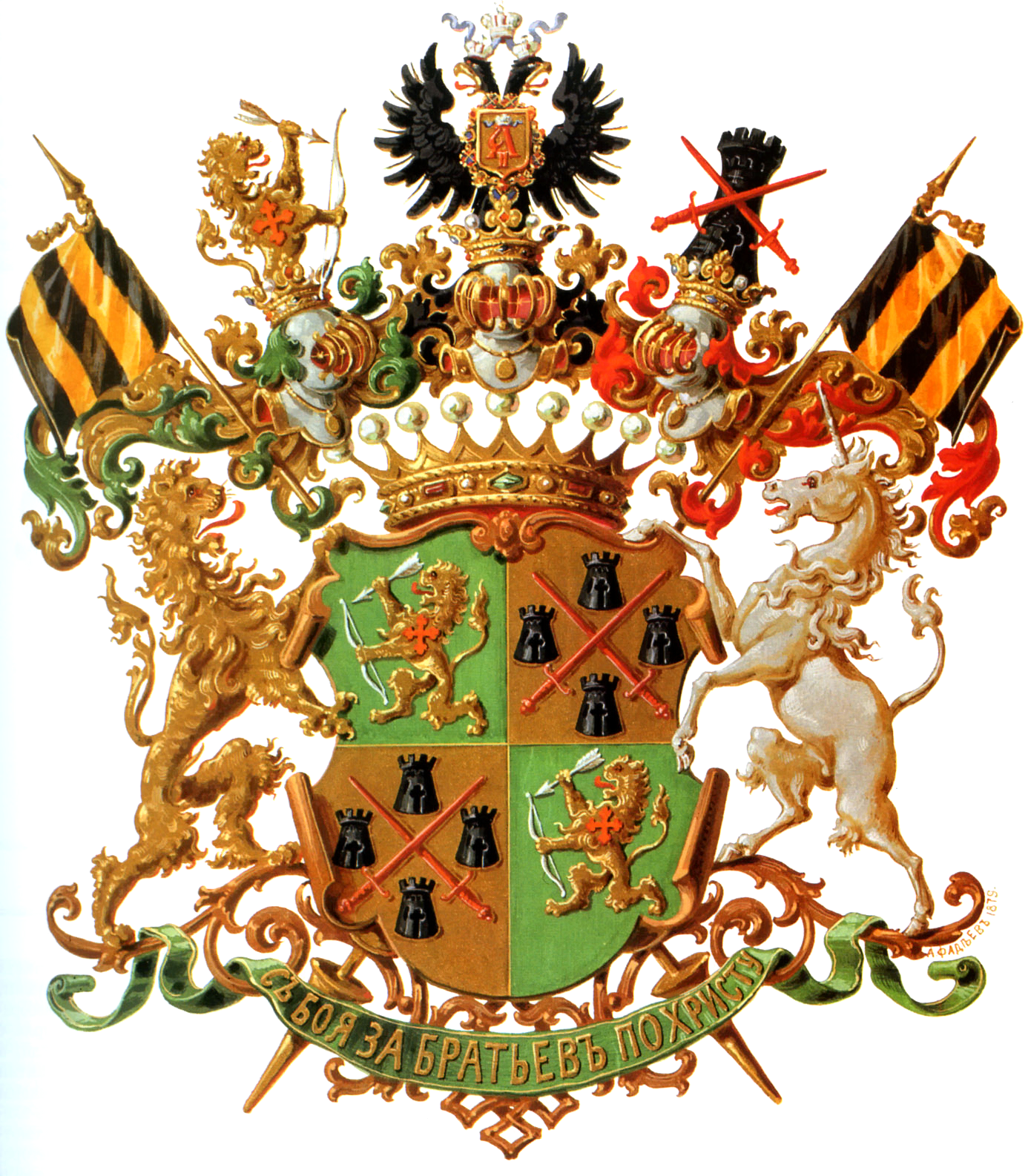
Coat of arms of Loris-Melikov family, branch of the House of Mirimanidze

The House of Mirimanidze ("sons of Miriman") was an old Georgian noble family of Armenian ethnicity whose members rose in prominence in the service of Safavid Iran. Hailing from Somkhiti, the clan produced numerous high-ranking figures in the Safavid state, and especially flourished in the 17th century, during the reign of the kings Abbas I (r. 1588–1629), Safi (r. 1629–1642) and Abbas II (r. 1642–1666).

Due to the complex character of the family's identity, they were often described in different terms by contemporaneous historians. In the late Safavid era, Hosaynqoli Khan (Vakhtang VI of Kartli), vali (governor) of Kartli, confirmed the family as belonging to the t'avadi (upper class nobles).

With members of the Mirimanidze clan having returned to Christianity (Georgian Orthodox) from Shia Islam, they were included in the Treaty of Georgievsk (1783) as the Melikishvili. This inclusion in the Georgievsk Treaty guaranteed for their noble status later in the Russian Empire as the Melikovs along with a branch, the Loris-Melikovs (Armenian Apostolic).

== History ==
The Mirimanidze were originally hereditary Meliks of Somkhiti, a region nowadays located around the Armenian-Georgian borderlands. At the time, Somkhiti was located in the most southern part of Georgian Lower Kartli, and was therefore subjected to Safavid influence and rule from its earliest days. Somkhiti originally meant "the place where the Armenians live", and in the 18th century, the termination was largely replaced with "Somkheti" (სომხეთი, [somχetʰi]) as a Georgian exonym for Armenia. Armenians in general were (and are) referred to in Georgian as Somekhi (sing., სომეხი). The word "Mirimanidze" itself refers to Malek Miriman, who was permitted to rule Somkhiti by king (shah) Tahmasp I (r. 1514–1576). The family is therefore named after him.

Though ethnically Armenian, numerous Safavid historians at the time (e.g. Parsadan Gorgijanidze, Fazli Khuzani, Molla Jalal, Arakel of Tabriz, Iskandar Beg Munshi) described the family's origins, and they did so quite differently and not unanimously as compared to each other. Iskander Beg attributed Georgian (Pers. Gorji) roots to one member of the family (Mirman Mirimanidze), while Molla Jalal referred to Tahmaspqoli (an uncle of Mirman Mirimanidze) as Armenian (Pers. Armani). Arakel of Tabriz, who was of Armenian origin himself referred to the Mirimanidzes as Georgian nobles, whereas Fazli Khuzani called Tahmaspqoli and his relatives as being either Georgian, Armenian or Kartlian (Pers. Kartili). This all to evidently illustrate the complex character of the family. Though the Mirimanidzes gained their status from the Safavids and were primarily known for their role in the Safavid ranks, they were also acknowledged as being one of the powerful noble families at the local court of the valis/kings of Kartli. The "code of Vakhtang VI", composed in the early 18th century, placed the Mirimanidze clan amongst the greatest nobles (didebuli t'avadi).

The first Safavid gholam of the family was Tahmaspqoli, titled Anīs ol-Dowleh, and was an influential Safavid official who served king Abbas I closely, though he had begun his service before Abbas I's reign. He was the uncle of the most prominent member of the family, Mirman Mirimanidze (better known as Safiqoli Khan), who was thus the grandson of Malek Miriman.

Members of the Mirimanidze family later converted back to Christianity, adhering to the Georgian Orthodox Church. After the Russian annexation of Georgia in 1801, the family's noble status was confirmed by the Treaty of Georgievsk of 1783, in which they were described as Melikishvili, lit. "sons of Melik". A branch of the family started to adhere to the Armenian Apostolic Church, and came to be known as Loris-Melikov (i.e. "Meliks of Lori"). The Loris-Melikov branch produced several noted individuals in the Russian Empire, most notably Count Mikhail Loris-Melikov (1825–88).

== Notable Members ==
- Malek Miriman, Safavid governor of Somkhiti. First known member of the Mirimanidze line
- Safiqoli Khan (born Mirman Mirimanidze; died 1631), Safavid royal gholam, who also served as governor of Baghdad, Hamadan, and as the local qurchi-bashi of Najaf
- Malek Atabek Mirimanidze
- Tahmaspqoli Mirimanidze
- Qorkhmaz Mirimanidze
- Bektash Khan (died 1639), governor of Baghdad
- Atabegi Mirimanidze
- Qorkhmaz b. Atabegi Mirimanidze
- Mohammad Beg Mirimanidze, governor of Bost
- Kamarbeg Mirimanidze
- Avtandil Mirimanidze
- Mihrab Khan (died 1648), governor of Bost, Astrabad, Kandahar, and Shirvan
- Manuchehr Mirimanidze, governor of Astrabad, Kandahar, and Shirvan

== Sources ==
- Floor, Willem; Herzig, Edmund (2015). Iran and the World in the Safavid Age. I.B.Tauris. p. 481. ISBN 978-1780769905.
- Maeda, Hirotake (2003). "On the Ethno-Social Background of Four Gholām Families from Georgia in Safavid Iran". Studia Iranica (32): 1–278.
- Newman, Andrew J. (2008). Safavid Iran: Rebirth of a Persian Empire. I.B.Tauris. p. 186. ISBN 978-0857716613.
- Rapp, Stephen H. (2003). Studies In Medieval Georgian Historiography: Early Texts and Eurasian Contexts. Peeters Publishers. ISBN 978-9042913189.
