= Safiqoli Khan =

Safavid official and gholam

Prefect of New Julfa
- In office 1618/19–1626
- Preceded by: Unknown
- Succeeded by: Otar Beg

Governor of Baghdad
- In office 1624–1631
- Preceded by: Ottoman rule
- Succeeded by: Bektash Khan

Governor of Hamadan
- In office 1619/20–1623
- Preceded by: Hasan Khan Ustajlu
- Succeeded by: Hoseyn Khan Chavoshlu Ustajlu

Personal details
- Died: 1631
- Parent: Malek Qorkhmaz
- Clan: Mirimanidze
- Nickname: Mirman Mirimanidze

Military service
- Allegiance: Safavid Iran

Mirman Mirimanidze, better known as Safiqoli Khan (died 1631), was a Safavid official and gholam who served during the reigns of Abbas I (1588-1629) and Safi (1629-1642).

== Biography ==
Safiqoli's original name was Mirman, and he was a member of the Mirimanidze clan. His father was named Malek Qorkhmaz, and he had a brother named Malek Atabek (Atabegi). One of his uncles, Tahmaspqoli, who was bestowed with the title Anīs ol-Dowleh, was the first influential gholam from the family.

Safiqoli rose steadily through the Safavid ranks to become a yuzbashi (officer) early in his career. Later, in 1618–1619, he became prefect (darugha) of New Julfa in Isfahan, and was made governor (beglarbeg) of Hamadan shortly after, in 1619–1620. Following king Abbas I's recapture of Baghdad in 1624 during the Ottoman-Safavid War of 1623–1639, which ended many decades of Ottoman rule, Safiqoli was appointed as its new beglarbeg. In addition, he was made the local qurchi-bashi of the shrine city of Najaf.

Two of his close relatives were Mihrab Khan (d. 1648/49) and Manuchehr (sometime beglarbeg of Shirvan).

== Sources ==
- Floor, Willem M. (2008). Titles and Emoluments in Safavid Iran: A Third Manual of Safavid Administration, by Mirza Naqi Nasiri. Washington, DC: Mage Publishers. p. 198. ISBN 978-1933823232.
- Floor, Willem; Herzig, Edmund, eds. (2012). "Exploitation of the Frontier". Iran and the World in the Safavid Age. I.B. Tauris. ISBN 978-1780769905.
- Maeda, Hirotake (2003). "On the Ethno-Social Background of Four Gholām Families from Georgia in Safavid Iran". Studia Iranica (32): 1–278.
- Newman, Andrew J. (2008). Safavid Iran: Rebirth of a Persian Empire. I.B.Tauris. p. 66. ISBN 978-0857716613.

Preceded by ?	Prefect of New Julfa; 1618/19-1626	Succeeded by Otar Beg
Preceded by Ottoman rule	Governor of Baghdad; 1624-1631	Succeeded by Bektash Khan
Preceded by [Qara] Hasan Khan Ustajlu	Governor of Hamadan; 1619/20-1623	Succeeded by Hoseyn Khan Chavoshlu Ustajlu
