= Ottoman Yemen =

Ottoman Yemen may refer to:

- Yemen Eyalet (1517–1872), an eyalet (top-level province) of the Ottoman Empire, roughly encompassing modern Yemen
  - Yemen Vilayet (1872–1919), its name after a land reform that changed eyalets into vilayets
