= Beylerbey =

Title in the medieval and modern Islamic world

The eyalets of the Ottoman Empire in 1609

Beylerbey (Ottoman Turkish: بكلربكی, romanized: beylerbeyi, lit. 'bey of beys', meaning the 'commander of commanders' or 'lord of lords’, sometimes rendered governor-general) was a high rank in the western Islamic world in the late Middle Ages and early modern period, from the Anatolian Seljuks and the Ilkhanids to Safavid Iran and the Ottoman Empire. Initially designating a commander-in-chief, it eventually came to be held by senior provincial governors. In Ottoman usage, where the rank survived the longest, it designated the governors-general of some of the largest and most important provinces, although in later centuries it became devalued into a mere honorific title. The title is originally Turkic and its equivalents in Arabic were amir al-umara, and in Persian, mir-i miran.

== Early use ==
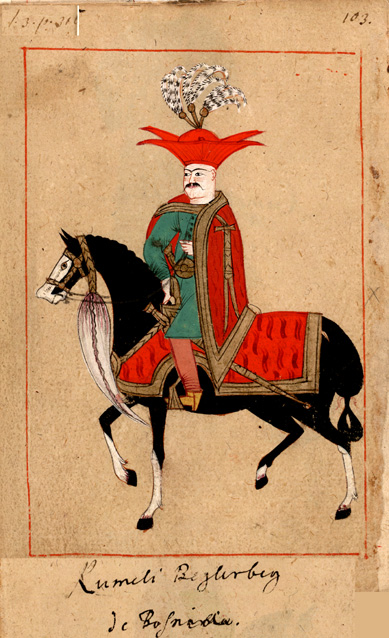
Depiction of the beylerbey of the Bosnia Eyalet (1657)

The title originated with the Seljuks, and was used in the Sultanate of Rum initially as an alternative for the Arabic title of malik al-umara ("chief of the commanders"), designating the army's commander-in-chief. Among the Mongol Ilkhanids, the title was used to designate the chief amir al-ulus ("emir of the state")—also known by the Turkic title ulusbegi and the Arabic amir al-umara–while in the Golden Horde it was applied to all the holders of the rank of amir al-ulus. The Mamluks of Egypt possibly used it as an alternative title for the atabak al-asakir, the commander-in-chief of the army.

== Ottoman use ==
The Ottomans used the title beylerbey from the late 14th until the mid-19th century, with varying meanings and degrees of importance. The early Ottoman state continued to use the term beylerbey in the meaning of commander-in-chief, held by princes of the Ottoman dynasty: under the Ottoman Empire's founder, Osman I (ruled 1299–1326), his son Orhan held the post, and during Orhan's reign (1324–1362), his brother Alaeddin Pasha and Orhan's son Süleyman Pasha.

The first step towards the transformation of the office into a gubernatorial title occurred when Murad I (r. 1362–1389) gave the title to Lala Shahin Pasha as a reward for his capture of Adrianople (modern Edirne) in the 1360s. In addition, Lala Shahin was given military authority over the Ottoman territories in Europe (Rumelia). This marked the beylerbey effectively as the viceroy of the European territories, as the Sultans still resided in Anatolia, and as the straits of the Bosporus and the Dardanelles, which connected the two parts of the Ottoman state, continued to escape full Ottoman control until the Fall of Constantinople in 1453.

Lala Shahin died after 1388. Sometime in 1385–87 Çandarlı Kara Halil Hayreddin Pasha succeeded him in the position of commander-in-chief in Rumelia. In 1393 Sultan Bayezid I (r. 1389–1402) appointed Kara Timurtash as beylerbey and viceroy in Anatolia, when Bayezid himself crossed over into Europe to campaign against Mircea I of Wallachia. This process marked the birth of the first two, and by far the most important, beylerbeyliks: those of Rumelia and Anatolia, while the third beylerbeylik, that of Rûm, followed soon after.

The beylerbey was in charge of a province—termed a beylerbeylik or generically vilayet, "province", while after 1591 the term eyalet was used and beylerbeylik came to mean the office of beylerbey. Territorial beylerbeyliks were subdivided into sanjaks or liwas under sanjakbeys. With the continuous growth of the Ottoman Empire in the 15th and 16th centuries, new provinces were established, and the ranks of the beylerbeys swelled to a peak of 44 by the end of the 16th century. A list of eyalets in 1609 mentions 32 in total: 23 of them regular eyalets where revenue was distributed among the military fief-holders, while the rest (in North Africa and the Middle East) were under the salyane system, i.e. their revenue was sent to the imperial treasury, and the officials and soldiers were paid salaries from it. The size of these new provinces varied enormously: some containing as many as twenty sanjaks, and others as few as two, including the beylerbey's own residence (or pasha-sanjakı). Among themselves, the various beylerbeys had an order of precedence based on the date of conquest or formation of their provinces. The beylerbey of Rumelia, however, retained his pre-eminence, ranking first among the other provincial governors-general, and being accorded a seat in the Imperial Council (divan) after 1536. In addition, the post was occasionally held by the Sultan's chief minister, the Grand Vizier himself.

In his province, the beylerbey operated as a virtual viceroy of the Sultan: he had full authority over matters of war, justice and administration, except in so far as they were limited by the authority of other officials also appointed by the central government, chiefly the various fiscal secretaries under the mal defterdari, and the kadı, who could appeal directly to the imperial government. In addition, as a further check to their power, the Janissary contingents stationed in the province's cities were outside his authority, and beylerbeys were even forbidden from entering the fortresses garrisoned by the Janissaries. The beylerbey also had his own court and government council (divan) and could freely grant fiefs (timars and ziamets) without prior approval by the Sultan, although this right was curtailed after 1530, when beylerbey authority was restricted to the smaller timars only. Reflecting the office's origin in the military, the primary responsibility of the beylerbeys and their sanjakbeys was the maintenance of the sipahi cavalry, formed by holders of the military fiefs, whom they led in person on campaign.

From the reign of Mehmed II (r. 1451–1481) onwards, the title of beylerbey also became an honorary court rank, coming after the viziers; both viziers and beylerbeys were titled pashas, with the viziers sporting three horse-tails and the beylerbeys two. From the 16th century on, however, viziers could be appointed as provincial beylerbeys, enjoying precedence and authority over the ordinary beylerbeys of the neighbouring provinces. At the Battle of Addi Qarro against the Ethiopian Empire the forces of the Ottoman Empire were led by Ahmad pasha, beylerbey of habeş, who had established the province prior to their failed attempt to conquer the region. Towards the end of the 17th century, the title of 'beylerbey of Rumelia' ('Rumeli beylerbeysi) also began to be awarded as an honorific rank, alongside the actual holder of the provincial post, even to officials unrelated to the provincial administration, such as the chief treasurer (defterdar).

Beginning in the 18th century, the Arabic-origin title of wali began to be increasingly used for provincial governors-general at the expense of beylerbey, except for the two original beylerbeys of Rumelia and Anatolia; the Arabic title amir al-umara, and the Persian mir-i miran or mirmiran, which had been used as equivalents of the beylerbey, now increasingly came to refer only to the honorary rank, which in turn was increasingly devalued. The process culminated with the vilayet reform of 1864, after which wali became the only official designation for the governor-general of a province, while the title of beylerbey survived only in the honorary rank of Rumeli beylerbeysi, which continued in use alongside its Perso-Arabic equivalents.

== Safavid use ==
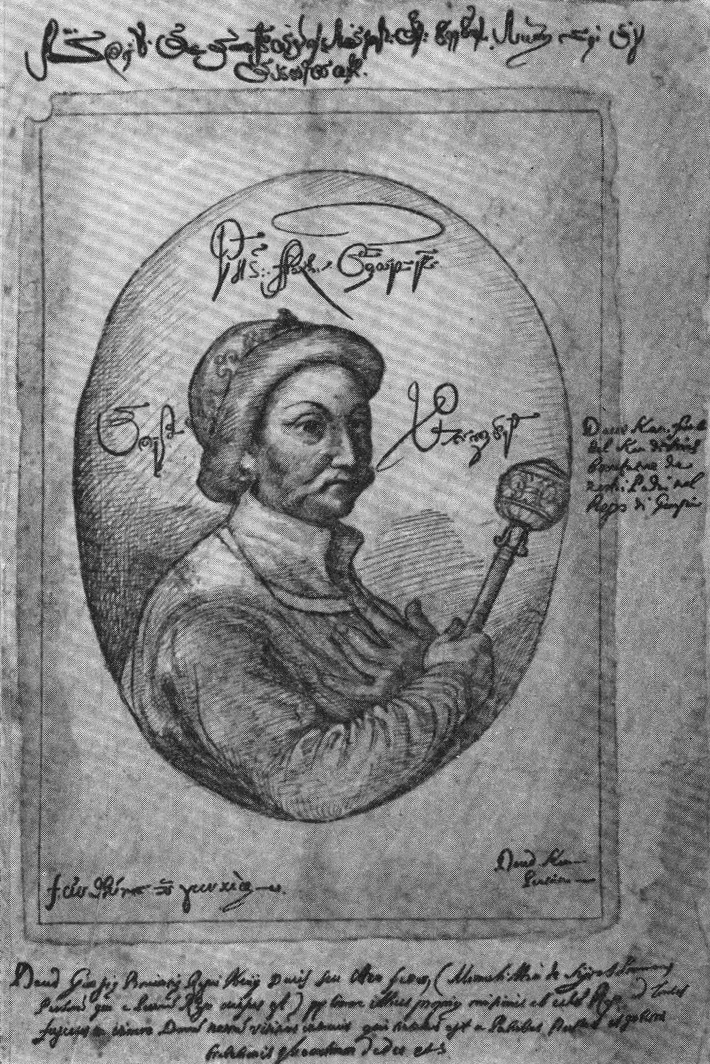
Daud Khan Undiladze, ghilman and the beylerbey of Ganja and Karabakh from 1625 to 1630.

Under the Safavid dynasty of Iran, the title (beglerbegi) was used from ca. 1543/44 on for governors (generically styled hakim) of the more important provinces. The title was thus used for the governors of Herat, Azerbaijan, Ganja, Karabakh, Shirvan, Fars, Iraq, and Astarabad. The Safavids also used the title of wali for provinces even more important than those of the beglerbegi. Towards the end of the Safavid period, the title of beglerbegi had been eclipsed by that of wali, most notably being the wali's of the shah's their Georgian areas.

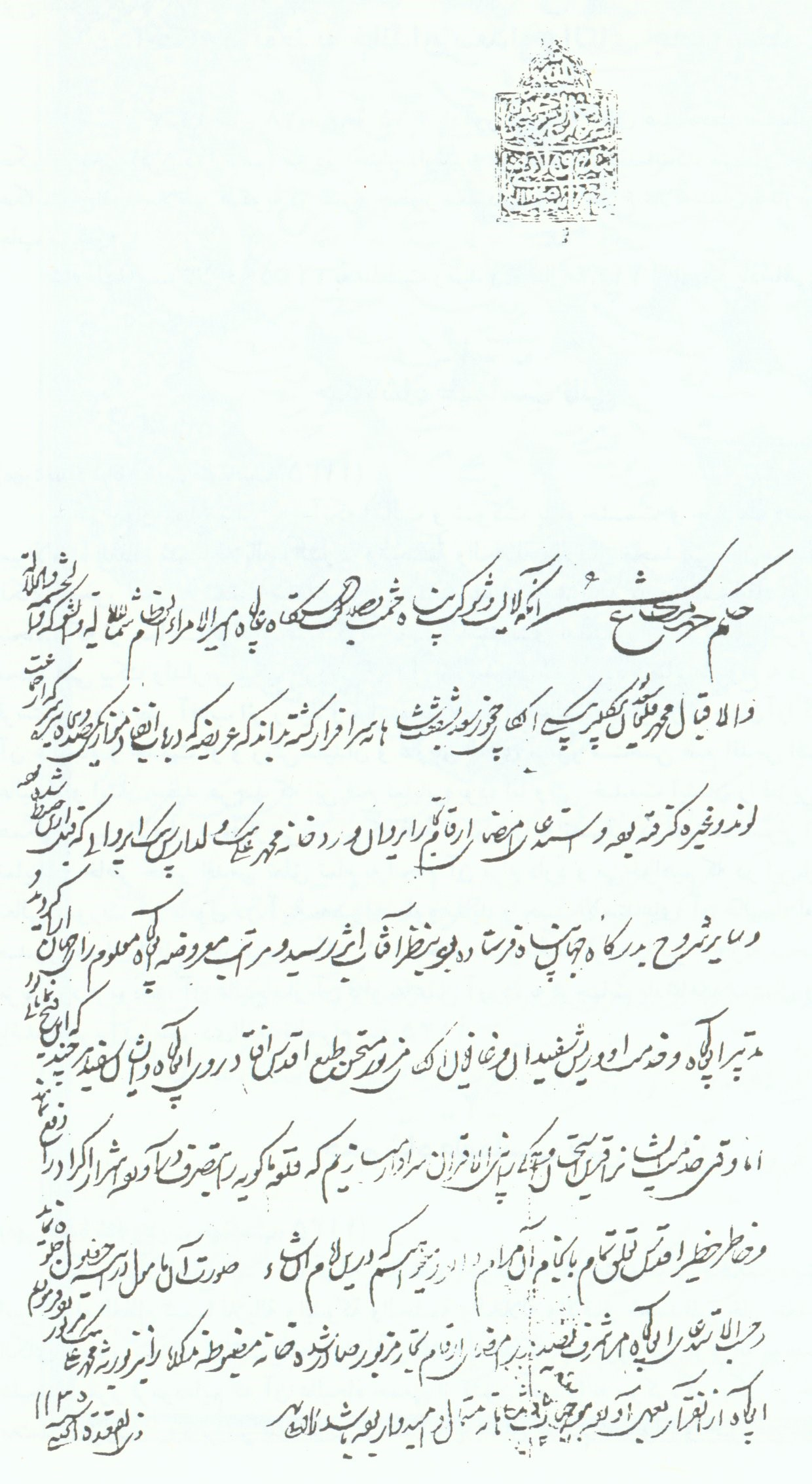
Farman (decree) from the Safavid ruler Tahmasp II for Mohammad Qoli Khan Sa'dlu, the beglerbegi of Chokhur-e Sa'd (Erivan) in reply to an appeal

Beglerbegi (Persian: بیگلربیگی) was a title generally held by governors of provinces of higher importance in Safavid Iran.

The title is of Turkish origin, meaning "beg of begs" (commander of commanders). Under the Safavids, it meant governor-general.

The title first appears in 1543/44, when the Safavid ruler Tahmasp I (r. 1524–1576) issued a decree that referred the governor of Herat as beglerbegi. The title was created to distinguish more important governors from less important ones. As a result, starting in the 1540s, governor-general (beglerbegi), senior-governor (hakem-khan), and junior-governor (hakem-soltan) were one of the titles that would be given to a emir governing a province or smaller administration.

Other beglerbegis soon appear in records, such as the beglerbegi of Astarabad in 1548, and the beglerbegi of Kerman in 1565. According to Willem Floor: "This, and the fact that beglerbegis also were at the same time emir al-omara of their jurisdiction, contradicts the view that the term beglerbegi was simply a Turkish translation of the title emir al-omara." Beglerbegi was only applied to governors of large administrations in the second half of the 16th century. The title was more commonly employed in the latter part of the 17th century, even for lesser administrations. Several khans and soltans were subject to the beglerbegi.

The beglerbegis had complete command over the soldiers and khans under their command. According to the early 18th-century Dastur al-Moluk, a beglerbegi was superior to a khan in rank, and the soltans were subordinate to the khan. The beglerbegi, who was also an emir, was also known as the emir al-omara of the province that he oversaw. There were eleven beglerbegis towards the end of the reign of Shah Abbas II (r. 1588–1629); five gholams (Fars, Karabakh, Baghdad, Astarabad, Shirvan), two valis of some sort (Lorestan and Kurdistan) and four Qizilbash emirs (Khorasan, Chokhur-e Sa'd (Erivan), Azerbaijan, Qandahar).

Herat and Kerman, which were among the first provinces to be administered by a beglerbegi, are not included in the list. This is due to not all of these administrations would continue to be governed by a beglerbegi after the 1630s. After the Treaty of Zuhab in 1639, the Safavids lost Baghdad to the Ottoman Empire. Between 1632 and 1722, a vizier oversaw the administration of Fars.

== Sources ==
- Birken, Andreas [in German] (1976). Die Provinzen des Osmanischen Reiches [The Provinces of the Ottoman Empire]. Beihefte zum Tübinger Atlas des Vorderen Orients, 13 (in German). Reichert. ISBN 3-920153-56-1.
- Floor, Willem (2001). Safavid Government Institutions. Mazda Publishers. ISBN 978-1568591353.
- İnalcık, Halil (1965). "Eyālet". In Lewis, B.; Pellat, Ch. & Schacht, J. (eds.). The Encyclopaedia of Islam, Second Edition. Volume II: C–G. Leiden: E. J. Brill. pp. 721–724. OCLC 495469475.
- Jackson, Peter (1989). "Beglerbegī". In Yarshater, Ehsan (ed.). Encyclopædia Iranica. Vol. IV/1: Bāyju–Behruz. London and New York: Routledge & Kegan Paul. p. 84. ISBN 978-0-71009-124-6.
- Ménage, V. L. (1960). "Beglerbegī". In Gibb, H. A. R.; Kramers, J. H.; Lévi-Provençal, E.; Schacht, J.; Lewis, B. & Pellat, Ch. (eds.). The Encyclopaedia of Islam, Second Edition. Volume I: A–B. Leiden: E. J. Brill. pp. 1159–1160. OCLC 495469456.
- İpşırlı, Mehmet (1992). BEYLERBEYİ (in Turkish). Vol. 6 (Besir Aga Camii - Cafer Pasa Tekkesi). Istanbul: TDV Encyclopedia of Islam. pp. 69–74. ISBN 978-97-53-89433-3.
