= Safavid Baghdad =

Province of the Safavid Empire, centred on the present-day Iraq

Baghdad province
- 1508–1534
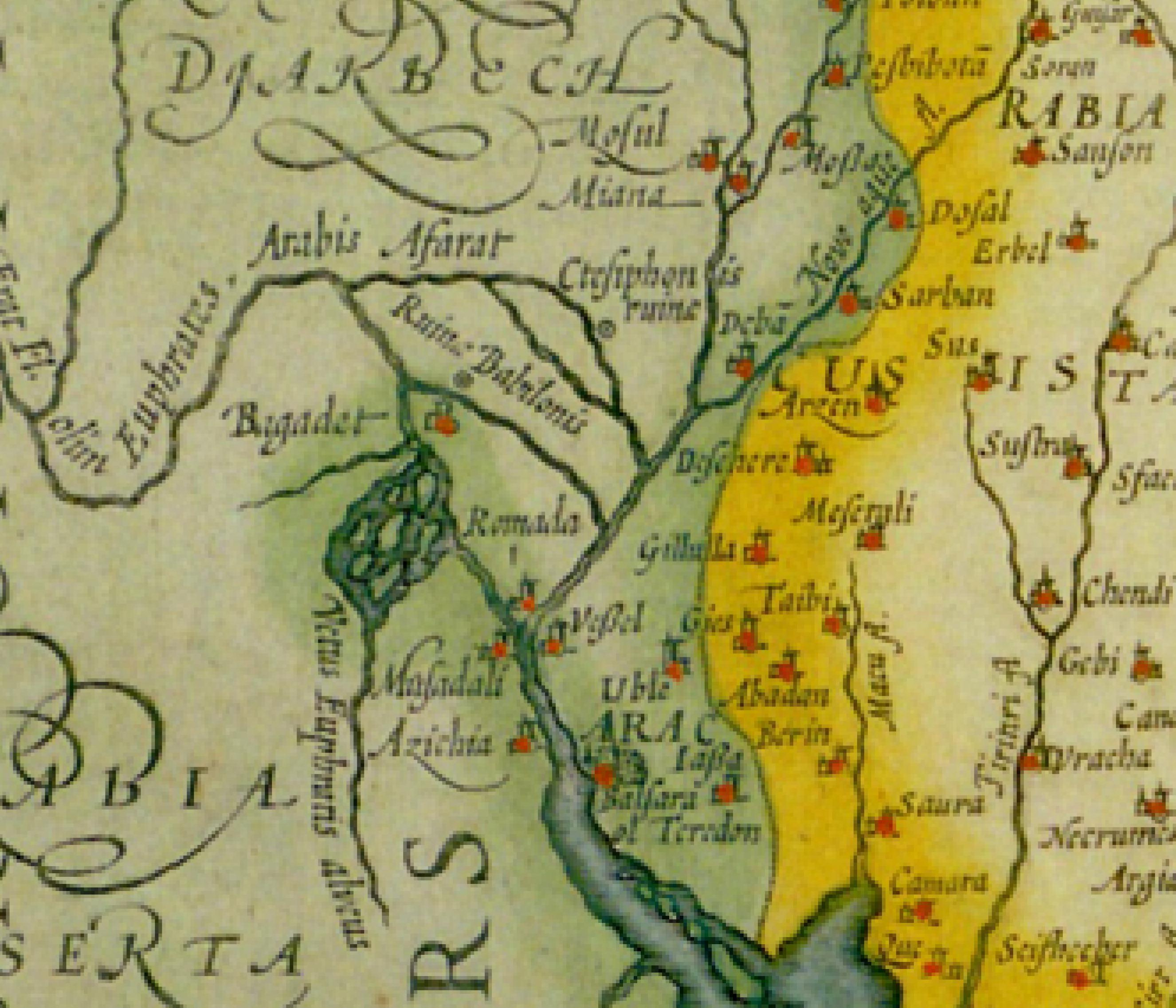
- Baghdad (Begadet) on a 1636 map created by Jodocus Hondius
- Status: Province of the Safavid Empire
- Capital: Baghdad
- Religion: Islam
- Government: Province
- Governor
- Historical era: Early modern period
  - Established: October 1508
  - Capture of Baghdad: December 1534
Succeeded by
Baghdad Eyalet
- Today part of: Iraq

The Baghdad province (Persian: ولایت بغداد, romanized: Velāyat-e Baghdād) was a province of the Safavid Empire, centred on the territory of the present-day Iraq. Baghdad was the provincial capital and the seat of the Safavid governors.

In October 1508, Shah Ismail entered into Baghdad. He appointed as governor of Iraq and Baghdad a certain Khadem Beg Talish. After the Shah took Baghdad, the city and its environs remained in Safavid hands until the Ottomans took the area in 1534 during the Campaign of the Two Iraqs.

== Other names ==
The Baghdad province later partly known as a Beglarbeglik under name of "Baghdad Beglarbeglik" (Persian: بیگلربیگی‌نشین بغداد, romanized: Beīglarbeīgī-neshīn-e Baghdād) nad sometimes called "Arabian Iraq Beglarbeglik" (Persian: بیگلربیگی‌نشین عراق عرب, romanized: Beīglarbeīgī-neshīn-e ʿErāq-e ʿArab) but In fact, Safavid territories of Arabian Iraq (Note: Arabian Iraq corresponded to much of the now-days Iraq, while Persian Iraq included the central regions of now-days Iran.) consisted of Diyarbakr and Baghdad provinces. Diyarbakr province fell to Ottomans in 1514 and only Baghdad province remained in the hands of Safavids.

== History ==
In the last years of Aq Qoyunlu Confederation hegemony, the Purnak clan (Persian: پُرناک) supported the claims of Murad ibn Yaqub ibn Uzun Hasan, helping him to maintain an authority in Baghdad; However the Purnak rule in Arabian Iraq survived the Safavid conquest of Diyarbakr by less than twelve months. In summer 1508, Shah Ismail I (r. 1501–1524) sent an envoy to Barik Beg Purnak, governor of Baghdad and Sultan Murad's commander-in-chief. Barik Beg declared his submission to Shah Ismail and his willingness to participate in the new order. Yet when Shah Ismail marched on Baghdad in person, Barik Beg and Sultan Murad fled to Aleppo. Entering the capital of Arabian Iraq in October 1508, Shah Ismail ordered the execution of all Purnak clansmen apprehended in the city. After abandoning Baghdad to the Safavids, Sultan Murad and Barik Beg tried without success to enlist the help of the Mamluk sultan Al-Ashraf Qansuh al-Ghuri against their enemies. With the Safavid takeover, many Persian merchants came to Baghdad and increased commercial activity.

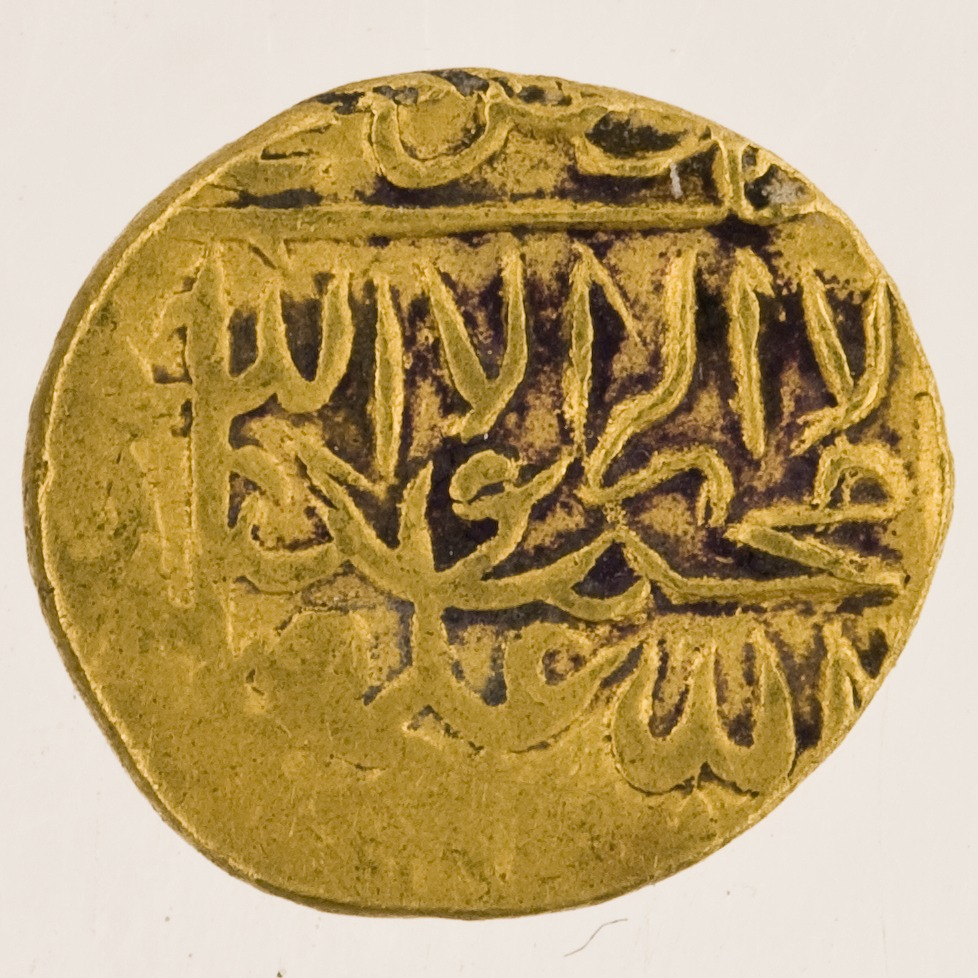
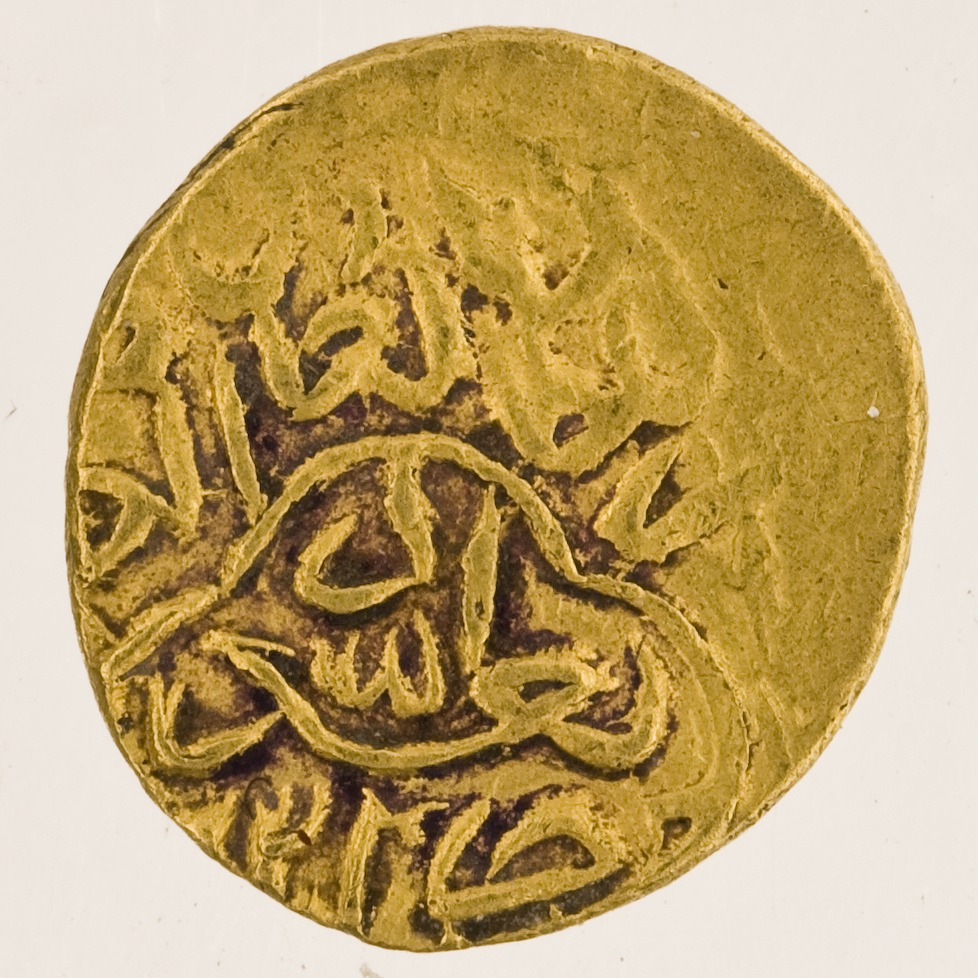
Gold coin of Shah Tahmasp I, struck at the Baghdad mint, dated 1527/8 (left = obverse; right = reverse)

Ebrahim Khan Kalhor, governor of Baghdad, was killed by his own nephew, the chief of the Kalhor Kurds, who seized Arabian Iraq. In 1530, Shah Tahmasp I (r. 1524–1576) besieged and recaptured Baghdad, appointing Sharaf al-Din Sultan as governor of Baghdad. In December 1534, Ottoman sultan Suleiman I (r. 1520–1566) conquered Baghdad in Campaign of the Two Iraqs. On Tahmasp's order, his governor of Baghdad left the city for Basra. His deputies presented the key of the city gate to Sultan Suleiman, and thenceforth Baghdad and Arabian Iraq became a dominion of the Ottoman Empire, except for brief interludes of Iranian occupation under Abbas I (r. 1588–1629) and Nader Shah (r. 1736–1747).

The Safavids managed to reclaim Baghdad in early 17th century. In January 1624, they conquered Baghdad at the beginning of the 1623–1639 war. Safavids defended against Ahmed Pasha's 1625–1626 campaign and Hüsrev Pasha's 1630 campaign but finally in December 1638, Baghdad was retaken by Sultan Murad IV (r. 1623–1640) and subsequently the peace treaty was signed. In 1624, when Safiqoli Khan became the new governor, he built a Saray (governmental house) in Baghdad. Furthermore, after the death of Safiqoli, when Bektash Khan, his maternal uncle, succeeded him made considerable repairs to the Baghdad's fortifications that were damaged in the previous sieges. He also built extensive outworks to prevent the enemy from approaching the walls of the city.

== Administration ==
The Baghdad province was consisted of Hilla, Ramadiyeh, Wasit, Kirkuk, Mandali, Zahab and other subordinate districts. Najaf, Karbala, Kazemeyn and Samarra were the important cities of the province. Aftermore, Jastan district was a dependency of the Baghdad province.

The governor also was Amir al-umara (commander-in-chief) of the province.

== Mint ==
There was a mint in Baghdad in which gold, silver and copper coins were struck.

== List of governors ==
- Khadem Beg Talish (1508–?)
- Seyyed Suleiman (before 1518)
- Ebrahim Khan Kalhor (?–1528)
- Zu'l-Faqar Khan Kalhor (1528–1529) (usurper)
- Ali Beg Mawsillu (1528–1529)
- Mohammad Khan Takkalu (Sharaf al-Din Sultan) (1529–1534)

== Footnotes ==
=== Sources ===
- Duri, A.A. [in Italian] (1960). "BAG̲H̲DĀD". In Gibb, H. A. R.; Kramers, J. H.; Lévi-Provençal, E.; Schacht, J.; Lewis, B. & Pellat, Ch. (eds.). The Encyclopaedia of Islam, Second Edition. Volume I: A–B. Leiden: E. J. Brill. pp. 894–908. OCLC 495469456.
- Floor, Willem (2001). Safavid Government Institutions. Costa Mesa, California: Mazda Publishers. ISBN 1-568591-35-7.
- Jaques, Tony (2007). Dictionary of Battles and Sieges: A Guide to 8,500 Battles from Antiquity Through the Twenty-First Century. Vol. 1: A-E. Westport, Connecticut: Greenwood Press. ISBN 978-0-313-33537-2.
- Maeda, Hirotake (2003). "On the Ethno-Social Background of Four gholām Families from Georgia in Safavid Iran". Studia Iranica. 32 (2): 243–278. doi:10.2143/SI.32.2.563203.
- Matthee, Rudi (2006). "IRAQ iv. RELATIONS IN THE SAFAVID PERIOD". In Yarshater, Ehsan (ed.). Encyclopædia Iranica. Vol. XIII. Costa Mesa, California: Mazda Publishers. pp. 556–561. ISBN 0-933273-95-9.
- Mikaberidze, Alexander (2011). "Baghdad, Siege of (1638)". In Mikaberidze, Alexander (ed.). Conflict and Conquest in the Islamic World: A Historical Encyclopedia. Vol. 1. Santa Barbara, California: ABC-CLIO. pp. 177–178. ISBN 978-1-59884-336-1.
- Nasiri, Mirza Naqi (2008). Floor, Willem (ed.). Titles & Emoluments in Safavid Iran: A Third Manual of Safavid Administration. Translated by Willem Floor. Washington, D.C.: Mage Publishers. ISBN 978-1-933823-23-2.
- Savory, Roger (1980). Iran Under the Safavids. Cambridge: Cambridge University Press. ISBN 0-521224-83-7.
- Stanley, Bruce E. (2007). "Baghdad". In Dumper, Michael; Stanley, Bruce E. (eds.). Cities of the Middle East and North Africa: A Historical Encyclopedia. Santa Barbara, California: ABC-CLIO. pp. 55–63. ISBN 978-1-57607-919-5.
- Woods, John E. (1999). The Aqquyunlu: Clan, Confederation, Empire (revised and expanded ed.). Salt Lake City: University of Utah Press. ISBN 0-87480-565-1.
- Zaryab, Abbas (2006). "BAGHDAD ii. FROM THE MONGOL INVASION TO THE OTTOMAN OCCUPATION". In Yarshater, Ehsan (ed.). Encyclopædia Iranica (online ed.).
