= Bektash Khan (governor of Baghdad) =

Safavid official and gholam

Governor of Baghdad
- In office 1631–1638
- Monarch: Safi of Persia
- Preceded by: Safiqoli Khan
- Succeeded by: Ottoman governors

Personal details
- Died: 1639
- Relatives: Safiqoli Khan (nephew)
- Occupation: Military leader, official
- Clan: Mirimanidze

Military service
- Allegiance: Safavid Iran
- Battles/wars: Ottoman–Safavid War (1623–1639); Siege of Baghdad (1638)

Bektash Khan (Persian: بکتاش خان), also known as Bektash Khan Gorji (Persian: بکتاش خان گرجی) (died 1639), was a Safavid official and gholam who served as the governor (beglarbeg) of Baghdad between 1631 and 1638, during the reign of Shah (King) Safi (r. 1629–1642). His tenure was brought to an end in 1638 when the Ottomans captured the city during the ongoing Ottoman-Safavid War of 1623-39.

== Biography ==
Bektash Khan was a member of the Mirimanidze clan, whose members had steadily risen through the Safavid ranks with the advent of the reign of Shah Abbas I (1588-1629), but had held influential positions earlier as well. After the death of his nephew Safiqoli Khan (Mirman Mirimanidze), Bektash Khan succeeded him to the governorship of Baghdad.

Bektash Khan made considerable repairs to the fortifications that were damaged in the previous sieges. He also built extensive outworks to prevent the enemy from approaching the walls. During the decisive Ottoman siege of 1638, Bektash Khan offered tough resistance, and it took the Ottomans almost six weeks to take the city. Bektash Khan died a year after the fall of Baghdad; the modern historian Giorgio Rota notes that he may have died either of natural causes, by suicide, was murdered on the order of Ottoman Sultan Murad IV, or poisoned by his wife.

== Sources ==
- Bengio, O.; Litvak, Meir (2014). The Sunna and Shi'a in History: Division and Ecumenism in the Muslim Middle East. Springer. ISBN 978-1137495068.
- Floor, Willem (1997). "The Rise and Fall of Mirza Taqi, The Eunuch Grand Vizier (1043-55/1633-45)". Studia Iranica. 26 (2): 247. doi:10.2143/SI.26.2.2003944.
- Maeda, Hirotake (2003). "On the Ethno-Social Background of Four Gholām Families from Georgia in Safavid Iran". Studia Iranica (32): 1–278.
- Mikaberidze, Alexander, ed. (2011). Conflict and Conquest in the Islamic World: A Historical Encyclopedia [2 volumes]: A Historical Encyclopedia. ABC-CLIO. ISBN 978-1598843378.
- Rota, Giorgio (2008). "The death of Ṭahmaspqolī Xān Qājār according to a contemporary Ragusan source (How to become a renegade, 2)". In Ritter, Markus; Kauz, Ralph; Hoffmann, Birgitt (eds.). Iran und iranisch geprägte Kulturen, Studien zum 65. Geburtstag von Bert G. Fragner. Wiesbaden: Ludwig Reichert Verlag.

Preceded by Safiqoli Khan	Governor of Baghdad; 1631-1638	Succeeded by Ottoman governors
