= Baghdad Eyalet =

Administrative division of the Ottoman Empire from 1535 to 1864

Eyalet of Baghdad Arabic: إِيَالَةُ بَغْدَاد Ottoman Turkish: ایالت بغداد
- Eyalet of the Ottoman Empire; Under Safavid occupation (1624–1638)
- 1534–1864
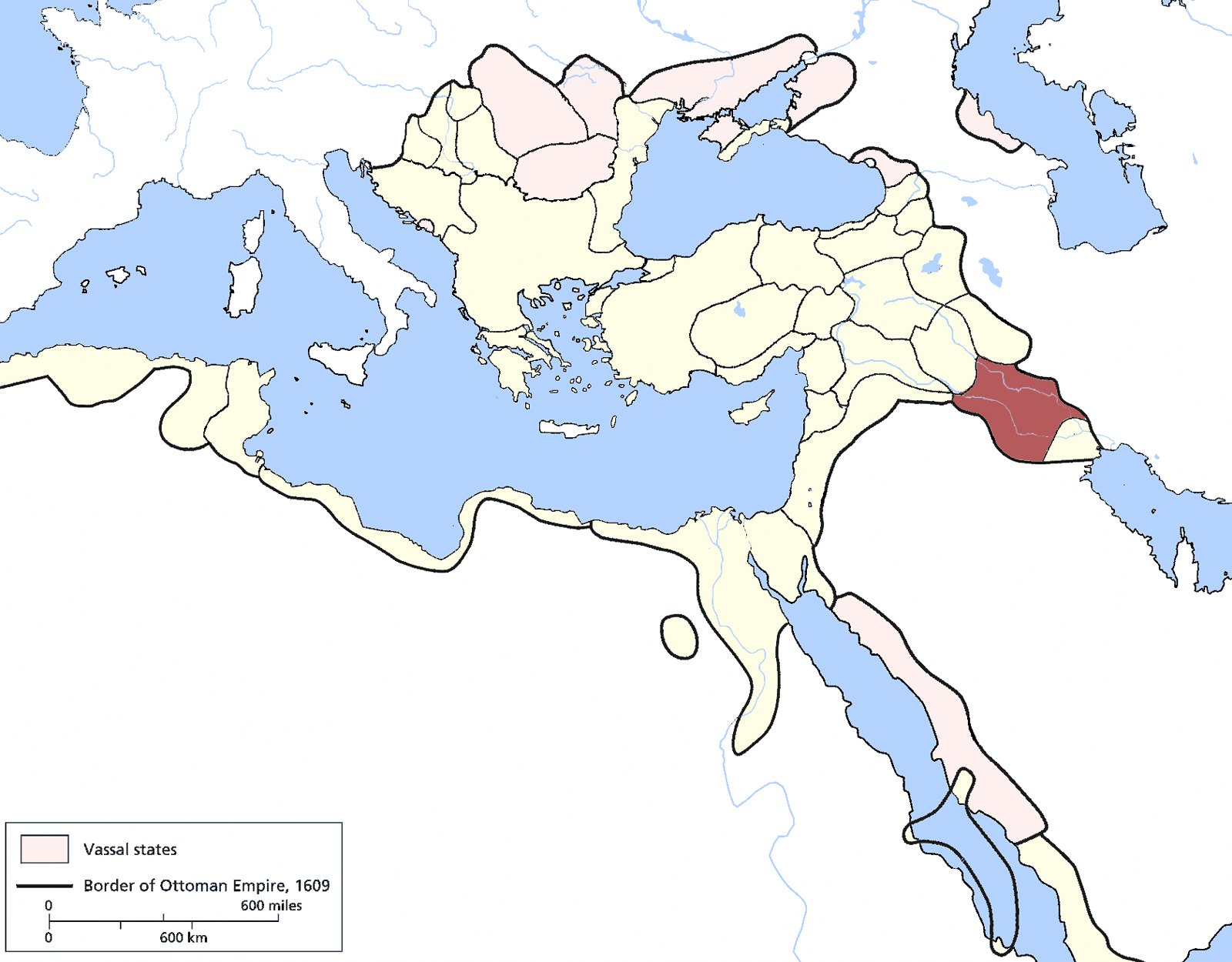
- The Baghdad Eyalet in 1609
- Capital: Baghdad
- History
  - Capture of Baghdad: 1534
  - Disestablished: 1864
Preceded by	Succeeded by
Safavid Baghdad; Mamluk Sultanate	Baghdad Vilayet
- Today part of: Iraq; Iran

Baghdad Eyalet (Arabic: إِيَالَةُ بَغْدَاد, Ottoman Turkish: ایالت بغداد, romanized: Eyālet-i Baġdād) was an eyalet of the Ottoman Empire, with Baghdad serving as the administrative capital of Ottoman Iraq (Kürsi-i Hıtta-i Irakiyye). Its reported area in the 19th century was 62,208 square miles (161,120 km^{2}).

== History ==
Safavid shah Ismail I took the Baghdad region from the Aq Qoyunlu in 1508. After the Safavid takeover, Sunni Muslims, Jews and Christians became targets of persecution, and were killed for being infidels. In addition, Shah Ismail ordered the destruction of the grave of Abu Hanifa, founder of the Hanafi school of law which the Ottomans adopted as their official legal guide.

In 1534, Baghdad was captured by the Ottoman Empire, and the eyalet was established in 1535. Between 1623 and 1638, it was once again in Iranian hands. It was decisively recaptured by the Ottomans in 1638, whose possession over Iraq was agreed upon in the 1639 Treaty of Zuhab.

For a time, Baghdad had been the largest city in the Middle East. The city saw relative revival in the latter part of the 18th century under a largely autonomous Mamluk government. Direct Ottoman rule was reimposed by Ali Ridha Pasha in 1831. From 1851 to 1852 and from 1861 to 1867, Baghdad was governed, under the Ottoman Empire by Mehmed Namık Pasha. The Nuttall Encyclopedia reports the 1907 population of Baghdad as 185,000.

== Administrative divisions ==
Sanjaks of Baghdad Eyalet in the 17th century:

- Seven of the eighteen Sanjaks of this eyalet were divided into ziamets and Timars:
1. Sanjak of Hilla
2. Sanjak of Zeng-abad
3. Sanjak of Javazar
4. Sanjak of Rumahia
5. Sanjak of Jangula
6. Sanjak of Kara-tagh
7. [the name of the seventh sanjak is missing]
- The other eleven sanjaks had no ziamets or Timars and were entirely in the power of their possessors:
1. Sanjak of Terteng
2. Sanjak of Samwat
3. Sanjak of Biat
4. Sanjak of Derneh
5. Sanjak of Deh-balad
6. Sanjak of Evset
7. Sanjak of Kerneh-deh
8. Sanjak of Demir-kapu
9. Sanjak of Karanieh
10. Sanjak of Kilan
11. Sanjak of Al-sah

Sanjaks between 1682 and 1702:

1. Sanjak of Baghdad
2. Government (Hükümeti) of Imadiyye
3. Sanjak of Hille
4. Sanjak of Cevâzir, Aşfatara, Kasr-ı Ruhûr, Mehcer and Reventin
5. Sanjak of Derne and Dertenk
6. Sanjak of Kasr-ı Şirin
7. Sanjak of Semavât
8. Sanjak of Zaho
9. Sanjak of Zeng-i Abâd
10. Sanjak of Cêssan-Bedre
11. Sanjak of Ane
12. Sanjak of Eriha
13. Sanjak of Kızıl Ribat
14. Sanjak of Altun Köpru
15. Sanjak of Herîr (Government (Hükümeti) of Şehrân)
16. Sanjak of Mîr-Aşiret-i Baclan

Sanjaks between 1727 and 1740

1. Sanjak of Baghdad
2. Government (Hükümeti) of Imadiyye
3. Sanjak of Derne and Dertenk
4. Sanjak of Mendelcin
5. Sanjak of Cêssan Bedre
6. Sanjak of Herîr (Government (Hükümeti) of Şehrân
7. Sanjak of Mendemi Aşireti (Mendemi Tribe)

== See also ==
- Ottoman Iraq
- List of Ottoman governors of Baghdad
