= Capture of Baghdad (1534) =

Part of the Ottoman–Safavid War (1532–1555)

Battle of Baghdad (1534)
- Part of the Ottoman–Safavid War (1532–55)
- Suleiman's conquests in the 1532–55 Ottoman-Safavid war gave him access to the Persian Gulf.
Date	December 1534
Location	Baghdad province, Arabian Iraq, Safavid Iran 33.35°N 44.42°E
Result	Ottoman victory
Territorial changes	Ottomans capture Baghdad

Belligerents
Safavid Empire	Ottoman Empire

Commanders and leaders
Tahmasp I	Suleiman I Grand Vizier Ibrahim Pasha

The 1534 capture of Baghdad by the Ottoman Sultan Suleiman the Magnificent from the Safavid Shah Tahmasp I was part of his Campaign of the Two Iraqs during the Ottoman–Safavid War (1532–1555). The city was taken without resistance, the Safavid government having fled and leaving the city undefended.

Baghdad's capture was a significant achievement given its mastery of the Tigris and Euphrates rivers and their international and regional trade. It represented, along with the fall of Basra in 1546, a significant step towards eventual Ottoman victory and the procurement of the lower Mesopotamia, the mouths of the Euphrates and Tigris rivers, opening a trading outlet into the Persian Gulf.

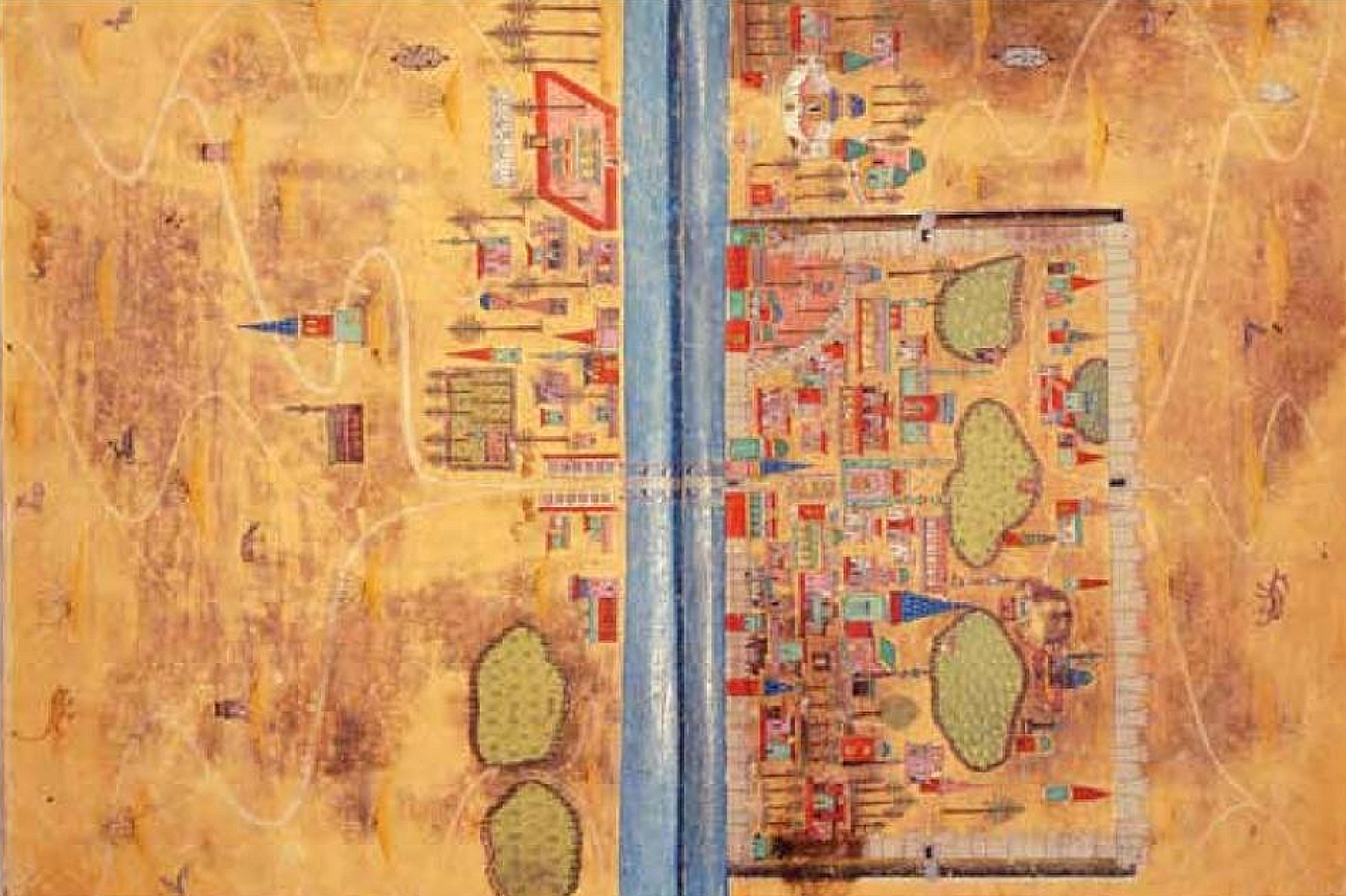
Baghdad, Folios 47b-48a, Beyan-ı Menazil by Matrakçı Nasuh, 944 AH 1537 CE.

The Ottomans wintered there until 1535, overseeing the reconstruction of Sunni religious monuments destroyed by the Safavids and initiating agricultural irrigation projects. Suleiman returned to Constantinople, leaving a strong garrison force. After the capture, Suleiman adopted the title “Shah of Baghdad in Iraq”. Hadım Suleiman Pasha was designated as Governor of Baghdad from 1535 to 1536, starting a long list of Ottoman governors of Baghdad.

Over the next few decades, the Ottomans solidified their control over the region, incorporating it into their empire until it was temporarily recaptured by the Persians in 1623. Baghdad again belonged to the Ottomans from 1638 until 1917, with its last governor Halil Kut.

== See also ==
- Growth of the Ottoman Empire
- Campaigns of Suleiman the Magnificent
- History of Baghdad
- Ottoman Iraq

== Sources ==
- Taner, Melis (2020). "Illustrated Manuscripts Attributed to Baghdad". Caught in a whirlwind: a cultural history of Ottoman Baghdad as reflected in its illustrated manuscripts. Leiden; Boston: Brill. ISBN 978-9004412699.
