= Timeline of Basra =

Coordinates: 30°30′N 47°49′E

The following is a timeline of the history of the city of Basra, Iraq.

== Prior to 16th century ==
- 638 CE – Military camp established by Utbah ibn Ghazwan per order of Omar ibn al-Khattab.
- 646 – Abdallah ibn Amer becomes governor.
- 658 – Battle of the Camel.
- 664 – Ziyad ibn Abihi becomes governor.
- 673 – Ubayd Allah ibn Ziyad becomes governor.
- 683 – Uprising against Umayyads.
- 684 – The governor Mas'ud ibn Amr is killed by the asāwira under Māh-Afrīdūn
- 691 – Abd al-Malik ibn Marwan in power.
- 701 – Uprising against the Umayyads.
- 772 – Ramparts built.
- 820 – Zott conflict.
- 868 – Zanj Rebellion.
- 871 – City sacked during Zanj Rebellion.
- 923 – Qaramitah conflict.
- 10th century – Public library active.
- 1052 – Traveller Nasir Khusraw visits city.
- 1122 – Imad ad-Din Zengi in power.
- 1123 – City wall rebuilt.
- 1258 – City sacked by Mongols.
- 1327 – Traveller Ibn Battuta visits city.
- 1411 – Kara Koyunlu in power.

== 16th-19th centuries ==
- 1546 – Ottomans in power.
- 1547 – Basra Eyalet (administrative region) formed.
- 1556 – Portuguese attempt to take city.
- 1596 – Afrasiyab becomes governor.
- 1604 – Population: 50,000 (approximate); number of houses: 10,000 (approximate).
- 1645 – English factory in business.
- 1668 – City was conquered by the Turks.
- 1694 – Muntafiq tribes in power.
- 1733 – City becomes part of Baghdad Eyalet (administrative region).
- 1763 – British East India Company in business.
- 1773 – Epidemic.
- 1777 – City besieged by Persian forces led by Sadiq Khan Zand.
- 1779 – Turks in power.
- 1823 – Population: 55,000 (approximate).
- 1840 – Turks in power.
- 1865 – Baghdad-Basra telegraph begins operating.
- 1884 – Basra Vilayet (administrative region) formed.

== 20th century ==
- 1901 – Consulate of Russia established.
- 1910 – Cholera and bubonic plague outbreak.
- 1911
  - Consulate of Germany established.
  - Cholera epidemic.
- 1913 – Reform Society of Basra founded.
- 1914 – Battle of Basra (1914); British in power.
- 1915 – April: Turkish forces attempt to take city.
- 1919 – Baghdad-Basra Railway in operation.
- 1920
  - Uprising against British occupation.
  - Population: 40,000 (approximate).
- 1947 – Population: 101,535.
- 1964 – University of Basrah established.
- 1965 – Population: 310,950.
- 1967 – Basrah Medical College established.
- 1982 – July: Iranian forces attempt to take city.
- 1984 – Iranian forces attempt to take city.
- 1987
  - January–February: Iranian forces attempt to take city.
  - Population: 406,296.
- 1991
  - 1 March: Uprising against Saddam Hussein.
  - Marsh Arab population in city expands.
- 1999
  - 25 January: Bombing by United States forces.
  - Uprising.

== 21st century ==
- 2003
  - March–April: Battle of Basra (2003); British forces in power.
  - August: Oil strike.
- 2004 – 21 April 2004 Basra bombings.
- 2005 – July: Oil strike.
- 2007
  - June: Al-Ashrah Al-Mubashra mosque bombed.
  - December: British military occupation ends.
  - Population: 1,912,533 (estimate).
- 2008 – Battle of Basra (2008).
- 2011 – 2011 Basra bombings.
- 2012 – 14 January 2012 Basra bombing.

== See also ==
- Timelines of other cities in Iraq: Baghdad, Mosul

== Bibliography ==
=== in English ===
Published in 19th century

- James Hingston Tuckey (1815). "Bussora". Maritime Geography and Statistics. London: Black, Parry, and Co.
- Jedidiah Morse; Richard C. Morse (1823), "Bassora", A New Universal Gazetteer (4th ed.), New Haven: S. Converse
- William Milburn; Thomas Thornton (1825). "Bussorah". Oriental Commerce. London: Kingsbury, Parbury, and Allen.
- J. R. Wellsted (1840), "(Busrah)", Travels to the City of the Caliphs, along the Shores of the Persian Gulf and the Mediterranean, London: H. Colburn, OCLC 5395027
- Ainsworth, William Harrison (1846). "Bassora". Ainsworth's Magazine. London.
- Al Hariri of Basra (1850). "The Makamah of the Mosque Beni Haram". Makamat: Or, Rhetorical Anecdotes. Translated by Theodore Preston. London: Oriental Translation Fund.. Also: The Makamah of Basra.
- James Horsburgh (1852). "Persian Gulf: Basra". India Directory: Or, Directions for Sailing to and from the East Indies, China, Australia, and the Interjacent Ports of Africa and South America (6th ed.). London: William H. Allen & Co. – via Google Books.
- Edward Balfour, ed. (1871). "Bassorah". Cyclopaedia of India and of Eastern and Southern Asia (2nd ed.). Madras.

Published in 20th century

- Pedro Teixeira (1902), "(Basora)", Travels of Pedro Teixeira, translated by William F. Sinclair, London: Printed for the Hakluyt Society
- Guy Le Strange (1905). "(Al-Basrah)". Lands of the Eastern Caliphate. Cambridge University Press. ISBN 978-1-107-60014-0.
- Peters, John Punnett (1910). "Basra" . Encyclopædia Britannica. Vol. 3 (11th ed.). p. 489.
- Hamdallah Mustawfi (1910). Tarikh-i guzida. Translated by Edward G Browne.. (Includes description of Basra in the 14th century)
- R. Hartmann (1913). "al-Basra". Encyclopaedia of Islam. Brill. ISBN 90-04-08265-4.
- "Al Basra". Persian Gulf Pilot. Washington DC: Government Printing Office. 1920.
- A. J. Naji; Y. N. Ali (1981). "The Suqs of Basrah: Commercial Organization and Activity in a Medieval Islamic City". Journal of the Economic and Social History of the Orient. 24: 298–324. doi:10.1163/156852081X00130.
- Eliezer Tauber (1989). "Sayyid Talib and the Young Turks in Basra". Middle Eastern Studies. 25.
- Khoury (1992). "Iraqi Cities during the Early Ottoman Period: Mosul and Basra". Arab Historical Review for Ottoman Studies.

Published in 21st century

- Thabit A. J. Abdullah (2001), Merchants, Mamluks, and Murder: The Political Economy of Trade in Eighteenth-Century Basra, State University of New York Press, ISBN 978-0-7914-4807-6, 079144807X
- Soli Shahvar (2003). "Tribes and Telegraphs in Lower Iraq: The Muntafiq and the Baghdad-Basrah Telegraph Line of 1863-65". Middle Eastern Studies. 39.
- Rudi Matthee (2006). "Between Arabs, Turks and Iranians: The Town of Basra, 1600-1700". Bulletin of the School of Oriental and African Studies, University of London. 69: 53–78. doi:10.1017/s0041977x06000036. S2CID 159935186.
- Josef W. Meri, ed. (2006). "Basra". Medieval Islamic Civilization. Routledge. ISBN 978-0-415-96691-7.
- C. Edmund Bosworth, ed. (2007). "Basra". Historic Cities of the Islamic World. Leiden: Koninklijke Brill. p. 49+.
- Bruce Stanley (2008), "Basrah", in Michael R.T. Dumper; Bruce E. Stanley (eds.), Cities of the Middle East and North Africa, Santa Barbara, USA: ABC-CLIO, p. 72+
- Gabor Agoston; Bruce Alan Masters (2009). "Basra". Encyclopedia of the Ottoman Empire. Facts on File. ISBN 978-1-4381-1025-7.
- "Basra". Grove Encyclopedia of Islamic Art & Architecture. Oxford University Press. 2009.

=== in other languages ===
- Jean Baptiste Tavernier (1676). "Suite de la mesme route depuis Bagdat jusqua Balsara". Les Six Voyages (in French). Paris.
- Jacques Savary des Brûlons (1748). "Bassora". Dictionnaire universel de commerce (in French) (New ed.). Paris: Estienne et fils. hdl:2027/ucm.5317968141.
- Domenico Sestini (1798). "Arrivee et sejour a Bassora". Voyage de Constantinople à Bassora en 1781 (in French). Paris.
- Vital Cuinet (1894). "Bassorah". La Turquie d'Asie (in French). Paris: Leroux.
- Max Freiherr von Oppenheim (1899), "(Basra)", Vom Mittelmeer zum Persischen Golf (in German), Berlin: D. Reimer (E. Vohsen), OCLC 13166400
- Leone Caetani (1905), "14 a.H. (al-Basrah etc.)", Annali dell'Islam (in Italian), Milano: Hoepli
