= Timeline of Mosul =

The following is a timeline of the history of the city of Mosul, Iraq.

== Prior to 16th century ==
- 570 CE – Mar Ishaya (monastery) founded across river from Ninevah; surrounding settlement later develops.
- 641 CE – Arab forces of Utba bin Farqad take fortress in settlement.
- 847 CE – 24 November: Earthquake.
- 874/875 CE – Taghlibi Khidr bin Ahmad becomes governor.
- 880 CE – Ishaq ibn Kundaj becomes governor.
- 892 – Mosul besieged by forces of Harun bin Sulayman and Banu Shayban.
- 907 – Hamdanids in power.
- 990s – Syrian Uqaylids in power.
- 1095/1096 – Seljuqs in power.
- 1127/1128 – Seljuqs ousted by Imad ad-Din Zengi.
- 1146 – Saif ad-Din Ghazi I in power.
- 1170 – Great Mosque of al-Nuri construction begins.
- 1182 – Mosul besieged by forces of Saladin during rule of Izz ad-Din Mas'ud.
- 1185 – Mosul again besieged by forces of Saladin.
- 1224 – Mosul taken by forces of Badr al-Din Lu'lu'.
- 1239 – Mashhad Imam Yahya ibn al-Qasim (mausoleum) built near city.
- 1248 – Imam Awn al-Din shrine built.
- 1258 – Mosul sacked by forces of Hulagu Khan.
- 1262 – July: Mosul taken by Mongol forces.

== 16th–19th centuries ==
- 1516 – Ottomans in power.
- 1535 – Ottoman administrative Mosul Eyalet created.
- 1623 – Mosul taken by Persian forces (approximate date).
- 1625 – Persians ousted; Ottomans in power again.
- 1719 – Sari Mustafa becomes governor.
- 1730 – Hussein Jalili appointed governor.
- 1733 – Mosul besieged by forces of Nadir Khan.
- 1743 – Siege of Mosul (1743) by Persian forces.
- 1745 – Battle of Mosul (1745) fought in vicinity of city.
- 1826 – Unrest; governor Yahya al-Jalili ousted.
- 1839 – Ottoman administrative reform begins per Edict of Gülhane.
- 1854 – "Rebellion" against administrative reform.

== 20th century ==
- 1920 – Population: 703,378 in vilayet (province).
- 1926 – Mosul becomes part of the Kingdom of Iraq per League of Nations ruling.
- 1947 – Population: 133,625 in city; 595,190 in province.
- 1957 – Mosul football club formed.
- 1960 – Ash-Shabibah newspaper published.
- 1965 – Population: 264,146.
- 1967 – University of Mosul founded.
- 1969
  - Mosul Spring Festival begins.
  - National Insurance Company built.
- 1970 – Population: 310,313 (estimate).
- 1986 – Mosul Dam begins operating near city.
- 1987 – Population: 664,221.

== 21st century ==
- 2003 – March–May: 2003 invasion of Iraq by U.S.-led forces; Mosul International Airport occupied.
- Other U.S. Army units to have occupied the city include the 4th Brigade Combat Team of the 1st Cavalry Division, the 172nd Stryker Brigade, the 3rd Brigade-2nd Infantry Division, 18th Engineer Brigade (Combat), Alpha Company 14th Engineer Battalion-555th Combat Engineer Brigade, 1st Brigade-25th Infantry Division, the 511th Military Police Company, the 812th Military Police Company and company-size units from Reserve components, an element of the 364th Civil Affairs Brigade, and the 404th Civil Affairs Battalion, which covered the areas north of the Green Line. The 67th Combat Support Hospital (CSH) deployed in support of Operation Iraqi Freedom (OIF) from January 2004 to January 2005, running split based operations in Mosul and Tikrit. The Task Force (TF) 67 Headquarters and Company B operated out of Forward Operating Base (FOB) Diamondback (Mosul), and Company A operating out of FOB Speicher (Tikrit).
- 2004
  - 24 June: 2004 Mosul bombings.
  - November: Battle of Mosul (2004).
- 2007 – 23 April: April 2007 Mosul massacre.
- 2008 – Ninawa campaign.
- 2013 – April: Anti-government protest.
- 2014
  - 4–10 June: Mosul taken by forces of the Islamic State of Iraq and the Levant.
  - June: Mass executions in ISIL occupied Mosul begin.
  - 16–19 August: Battle for Mosul Dam fought near city.
- 2015 – January: Mosul offensive (2015).
- 2016 – October: Battle of Mosul (2016–17) begins.
- 2017
  - 21 June: Great Mosque of al-Nuri destroyed.
  - July: Iraqi army takes city.

== Images ==
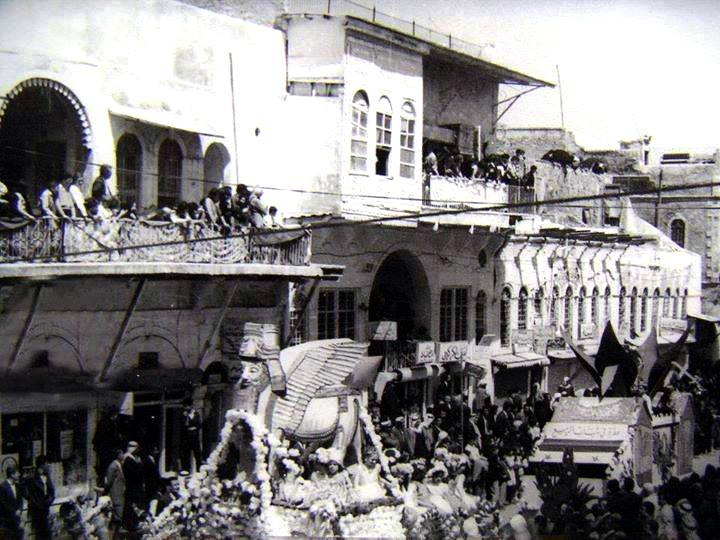
Spring Festival, est. 1969

== See also ==
- History of Mosul
- List of rulers of Mosul
- Nineveh, ancient Assyrian city located across river from present-day Mosul
- Timelines of other cities in Iraq: Baghdad, Basra

== Bibliography ==
Published in 19th century

- Jedidiah Morse; Richard C. Morse (1823). "Mosul". A New Universal Gazetteer (4th ed.). New Haven: S. Converse.
- "Mosul". Edinburgh Gazetteer (2nd ed.). Edinburgh: Longman, Rees, Orme, Brown, and Green. 1829.
- Josiah Conder (1834). "Mosul". Dictionary of Geography, Ancient and Modern. London: T. Tegg.
- William Francis Ainsworth (1842). "City of Mosul". Travels and Researches in Asia Minor, Mesopotamia, Chaldea, and Armenia. London: John W. Parker. hdl:2027/mdp.39015011385054.
- Edward Balfour, ed. (1871). "Mosul". Cyclopaedia of India and of Eastern and Southern Asia (2nd ed.). Madras.
- William Francis Ainsworth (1888). "First Visit to Mosul and Ninevah". Personal Narrative of the Euphrates Expedition. London.
- Charles Wilson, ed. (1895). "Mosul". Handbook for Travellers in Asia Minor, Transcaucasia, Persia, etc. London: John Murray. ISBN 9780524062142. OCLC 8979039.

Published in 20th century

- Friedrich Sarre; Ernst Herzfeld. Archäologische Reise im Euphrat- und Tigris-Gebiet (in German). Vol. 2. Berlin. pp. 203–305. OCLC 491984252. 1911–1920
- "Mosul". Palestine and Syria (5th ed.). Leipzig: Karl Baedeker. 1912.
- E. Honigmann (1993) [1927]. "Mosul". Encyclopedia of Islam. Leiden: Brill. pp. 609–611. via Google Books
- Th. Lefebvre (1927). "Le Vilayet de Mossoul". Annales de Géographie (in French). 36 – via Persée.
- Percy Kemp (1983). "Power and Knowledge in Jalili Mosul". Middle Eastern Studies. 19 (2): 201–212. doi:10.1080/00263208308700543. ISSN 0026-3206.
- Percy Kemp (1983). "History and Historiography in Jalili Mosul". Middle Eastern Studies. 19 (3): 345–376. doi:10.1080/00263208308700555.
- "Iraq: Mosul", Middle East, Australia: Lonely Planet, 1994, p. 309+, OL 16516298W
- Jacqueline Griffin (1996). "Mosul". In Trudy Ring (ed.). Middle East and Africa. International Dictionary of Historic Places. Routledge. pp. 522+. ISBN 9781884964039.
- Dina Rizk Khoury (1997). State and Provincial Society in the Ottoman Empire: Mosul, 1540-1834. Cambridge Studies in Islamic Civilization. Cambridge: Cambridge University Press. ISBN 0521894301.
- Sarah D. Shields (2000). Mosul before Iraq: Like Bees Making Five-Sided Cells. State University of New York Press. ISBN 978-0-7914-4487-0.

Published in 21st century

- Peter Sluglett (2002), "Mosul", in David Levinson and Karen Christensen (ed.), Encyclopedia of Modern Asia, NY: Charles Scribner's Sons, ISBN 0684806177
- Reeva S. Simon (2004), "Mosul", in Philip Mattar (ed.), Encyclopedia of the Modern Middle East and North Africa, NY: Macmillan Reference USA, ISBN 0028657691
- C. Edmund Bosworth, ed. (2007). "Mosul". Historic Cities of the Islamic World. Leiden: Koninklijke Brill. pp. 412+. ISBN 978-9004153882.
- Michael R.T. Dumper; Bruce E. Stanley, eds. (2008). "Mosul". Cities of the Middle East and North Africa. Santa Barbara, US: ABC-CLIO. ISBN 978-1576079195.
- Gabor Agoston; Bruce Alan Masters, eds. (2009). "Mosul". Encyclopedia of the Ottoman Empire. Facts on File. pp. 394–395. ISBN 978-1-4381-1025-7.
- "Mosul". Grove Encyclopedia of Islamic Art & Architecture. Oxford University Press. 2009.
- Beth K. Dougherty; Edmund A. Ghareeb (2013). "Mawsil". Historical Dictionary of Iraq (2nd ed.). Maryland, US: Scarecrow Press. p. 422. ISBN 978-0-8108-7942-3.
