= Mosul Eyalet =

Administrative division of the Ottoman Empire from 1535 to 1864

Coordinates: 36.3400°N 43.1300°E

Mosul Eyalet Arabic: إيالة الموصل Ottoman Turkish: ایالت موصل
- Eyalet of the Ottoman Empire
- 1535–1864
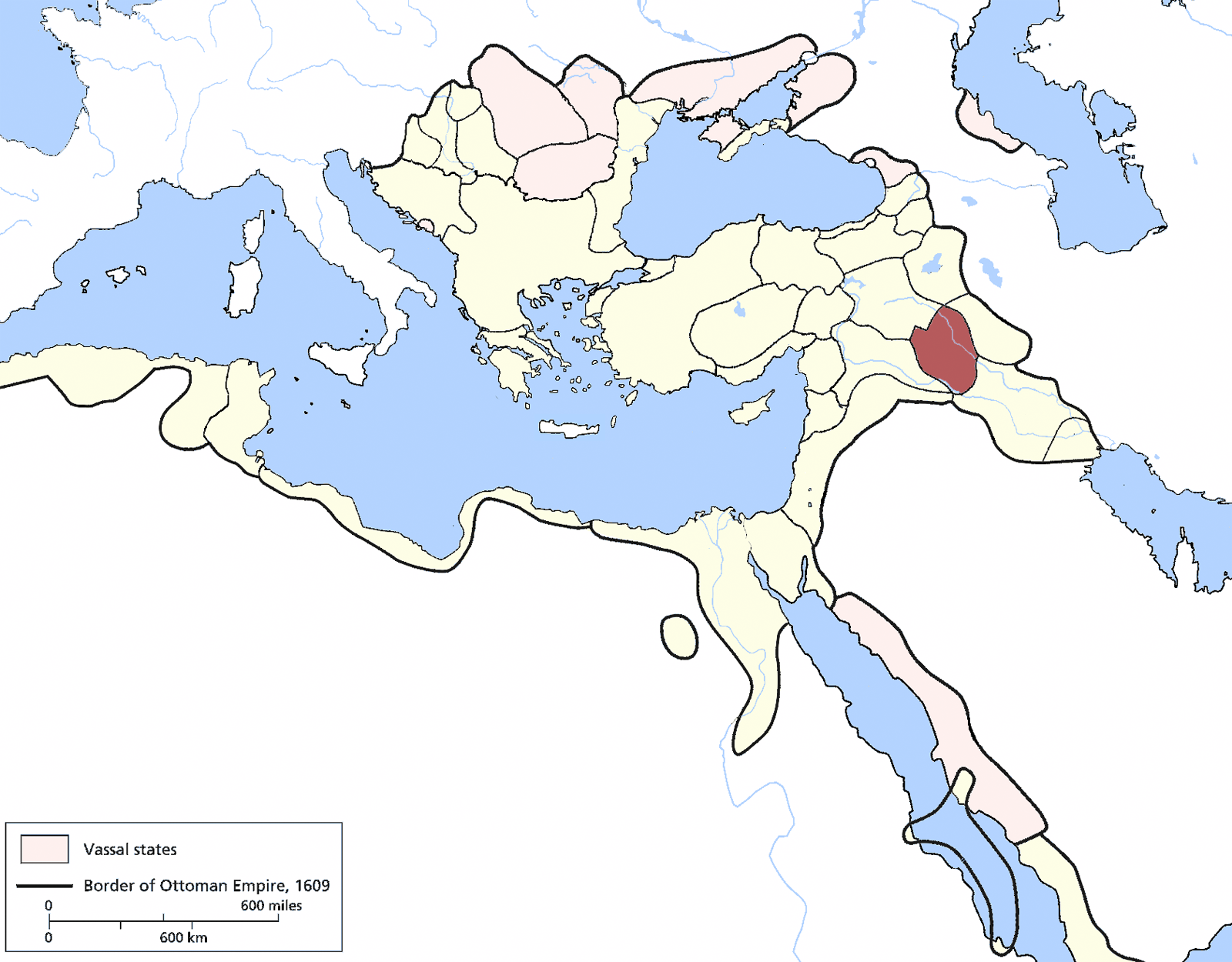
- The Mosul Eyalet in 1609
- Capital: Mosul
- History
  - Established: 1535
  - Disestablished: 1864
Preceded by	Succeeded by
Diyarbekir Eyalet	Baghdad Vilayet; Mosul Vilayet
- Today part of: Iraq

Mosul Eyalet (Arabic: إيالة الموصل; Ottoman Turkish: ایالت موصل, romanized: Eyālet-i Mūṣul) was an eyalet in Ottoman Iraq of the Ottoman Empire. Its reported area in the 19th century was 7,832 square miles (20,280 km^{2}). Although the eyalet was overwhelmingly Kurdish, the city of Mosul itself was largely inhabited by Arabs.

== History ==
Sultan Selim I defeated the army of Shah Ismail at the Battle of Çaldiran, but it wasn't until 1517 that Ottoman armies gained control of Mosul, which remained a frontier garrison city until the 1534 capture of Baghdad. The eyalet was established in 1535. Mosul then became one of three Ottoman administrative territorial units of ‘Irāk. In the 1840s, the Sanjak of Cizre, which before was a part of the Emirate of Bohtan in the Diyarbekir Eyalet, was added to the Mosul Eyalet, which led to an unsuccessful Kurdish revolt against the Ottoman Empire, led by Bedir Khan Beg.

== Administrative divisions ==
Sanjaks of Mosul Eyalet in the 17th century:

1. Sanjak of Bajwanli
2. Sanjak of Tekrit
3. Sanjak of Eski Mosul (Nineveh)
4. Sanjak of Harú

Sanjaks in 1701-1702:

1. Sanjak of Mosul
2. Sanjak of Harûn
3. Sanjak of Tikrit
4. Sanjak of Dohuk Kalesi, Mutahho and Zaho
5. Sanjak of Gafre Kalesi and Kili-i Deyr

Added in the 1840s

1. Sanjak of Cizre

== See also ==
- Jalili dynasty, rulers of the Mosul Eyalet from 1726 to 1834.
- List of Emirs of Mosul
- Timeline of Mosul
