= Basrah Medical College =

Iraqi medical college

- Type: Public University
- Established: 1967
- Location: Basrah, Iraq
- Campus: Urban
- Website: www.basmedcol.edu.iq

The Basrah Medical College (Arabic: كلية طب البصرة, romanized: Kulleyat Teb Al Basrah) is a constituent college of the University of Basra located in the city of Basra, Iraq. It was established in 1967. Undergraduate studies started in the 1967-1968 academic year after the acceptance of 67 students.
