= Citadel of Baghdad =

Historic Fort in Baghdad, Iraq

- قلعة بغداد
- Baghdad, Iraq
- The Citadel of Baghdad in 1923

Site information
- Type: Castle/Citadel
- Condition: Demolished

Site history
- Built: 1430
- Demolished: 1932

The Citadel of Baghdad (Arabic: قلعة بغداد, Qalʿat Baghdād), also known as the Inner Citadel (Ayç Qala, Çık Qala, or Topkhaneh), was a fortified military and administrative complex located on the eastern bank of the Tigris River in central Baghdad, near Bab al-Mu'azzam in the old al-Mukhram district. It occupied the north-western corner of al-Rusafa, overlooking the Tigris River and facing the al-Majidiyah Palace (later the site of the Medical City). Today, the site is occupied by the Iraqi Ministry of Defense.

The citadel formed part of Baghdad's defensive system and occupied a large square section of the city wall. It was surrounded by a quadrangular walled enclosure reinforced with cylindrical corner watchtowers and additional semi-circular towers between them, and it was protected by a moat approximately 5–7m deep (sometimes 25 feet deep). The walls along the Tigris were crowned with stepped battlements, and the upper parts of the walls and towers were later enclosed with wire mesh to impede infiltration. Rashid Street bordered the citadel to the east, while a wide street separated it from the Majidiya Palace. The city was governed by a Pasha, usually holding the rank of vizier, whose residence was the Citadel overlooking the Tigris River.

The Ottomans referred to it as Ayç Qala or Ayj Qala, meaning Inner Citadel, and later as Topkhaneh, meaning Cannon Post.

== History ==
=== Abbasid background ===
The site stood on land that originally contained Abbasid-era buildings in the al-Mukharram district, including the remains of a palace associated with the Abbasid caliph al-Ma'mun. An ancient Abbasid palace is said to have survived on the site. Earlier still, al-Mansur had built palaces for his son al-Mahdi in 770 AD on the east bank of the Tigris.

In 1095, the Abbasid caliph al-Mustazhir Billah constructed the wall of Al-Rusafa. The wall enclosed the city in an arc beginning from the Tigris near the later Qushla area, extending north and east to the present-day Eastern Gate. It was approximately 9 km long, 5.5 m wide, and reinforced by 117 watchtowers, and it was surrounded by a 7m deep moat. The most prominent gate was Bab al-Mu'azzam.

=== Early Turkic Origins (15-16th Century) ===
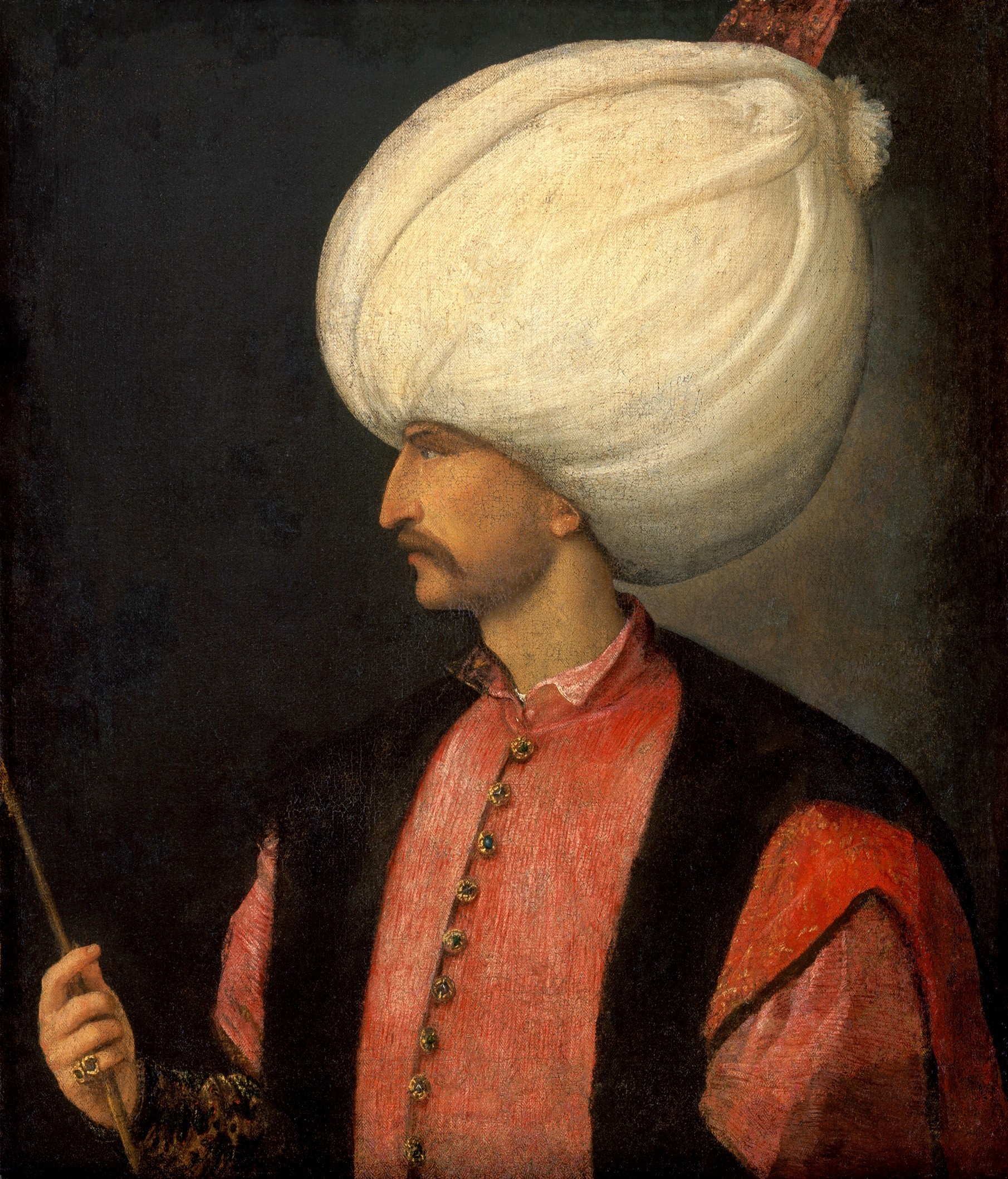
Suleiman the Magnificent carried out extensive renovations of the citadel

The construction of the Inner Citadel of Baghdad is generally dated to the Turkmen Qara Qoyunlu period in the mid-15th century, with some traditions placing its construction around 1430. The earliest recorded references to the citadel are believed to date to the events of 1445, while another source places its first mention in 1468. The citadel was considered an exceptional example of military architecture, as it functioned both as a fortress within the city and as a defensive stronghold integrated into Baghdad's walls and towers.

Between 1508–1524, during the first Safavid period of Baghdad, Shah Ismail I ordered the excavation of a tunnel beneath the citadel walls.

Following the Ottoman capture of Baghdad in 1534, the citadel underwent extensive renovation during the reign of Sultan Suleiman the Magnificent, who ordered the restoration of its walls and towers. The German traveler Leonhard Rauwolf, who visited Baghdad in 1573, described the citadel as still being internally unfinished.

Upon completion, the citadel contained several gates, including a main gate that opened onto the Midan (Army Square) and a secret gate overlooking the Tigris River. According to historical accounts, Bakr Subashi later entered the citadel through this secret gate, after which it was sealed by Suleiman Pasha during his renovation of the fortress in the 19th-century.

The adjacent Midan Square became one of the largest and most important public spaces in Baghdad. It served as a military training ground, parade ground, and gathering place for the city's population. The square also hosted horse markets and was surrounded by cafés where residents gathered to drink tea and coffee, smoke tobacco, and socialize. It additionally served as a location for public executions.

The citadel housed a variety of military, administrative, and religious facilities, including the Citadel Mosque, built by Jalal al-Din ibn Baha' al-Din in the Sikka Khana quarter (later mistakenly attributed to Sultan Murad IV); the mint (Sikka Khana); Ottoman government offices; the governor's palace; a Sufi lodge; additional mosques; soldiers' barracks; a ration store; a bakery; military storehouses; supply depots; the Citadel Prison; and an ammunition and military equipment depot.

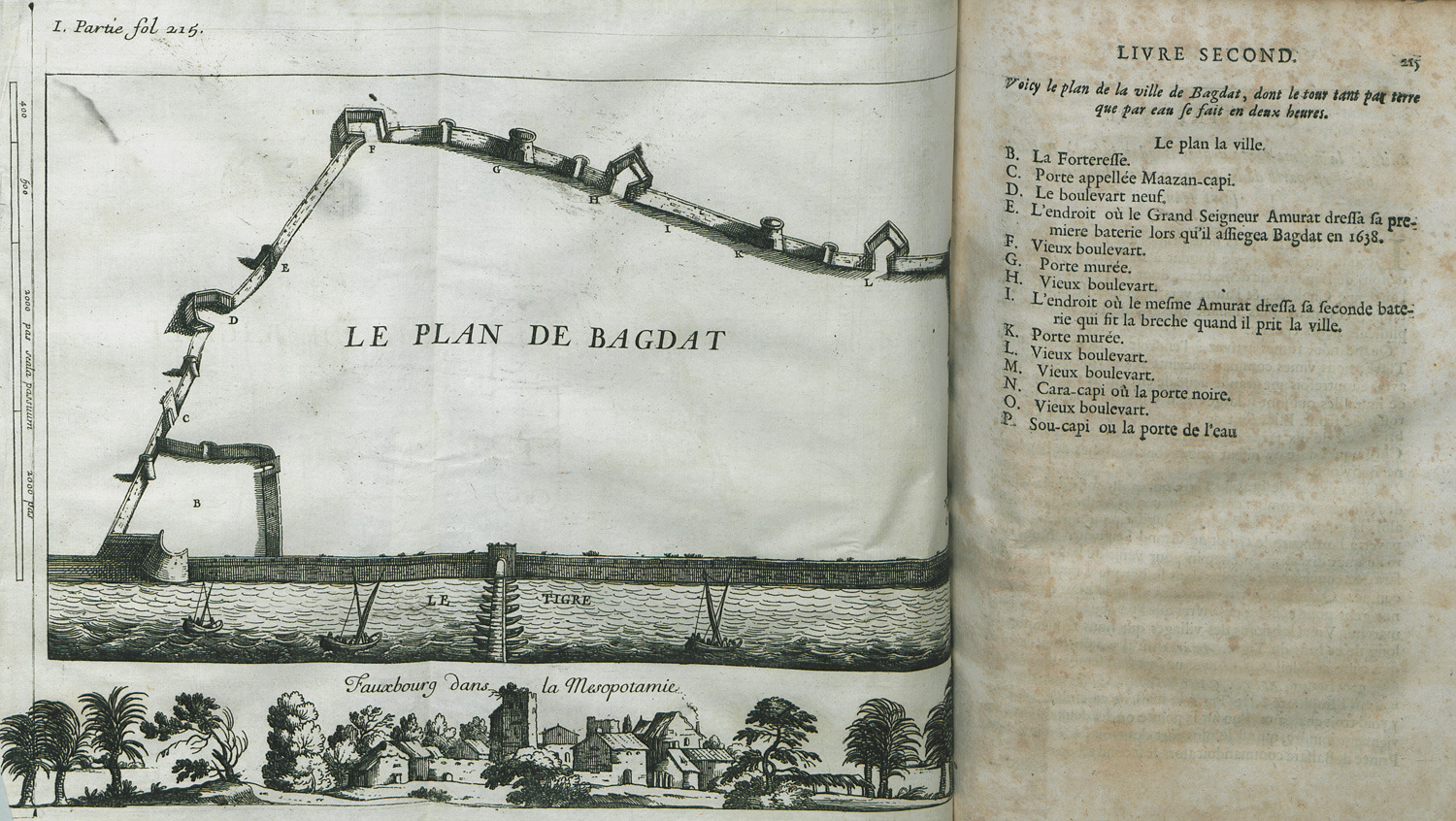
Citadel (labelled "B") drawn by Jean-Baptiste Tavernier in 1677

The citadel also served as the headquarters of the Janissary corps in Baghdad. The Janissary garrison was supplied from Istanbul, with accounts stating that their numbers reached approximately 12,000 men annually.

=== 17th century ===
During the Ottoman period, the Citadel of Baghdad remained the principal military and administrative stronghold of the city. In 1623, Bakr Subashi failed to defend the citadel, allowing Persian forces under Isa Khan, accompanied by approximately one thousand horsemen, to enter the fortress. The attackers opened fire on the inhabitants and displaced their children.

Between 1629 and 1638, Shah Safi al-Din oversaw the renovation of the inner citadel and the construction of a new tower under the supervision of the architect Majid Khan Ustajlu. Bektash Khan, the Safavid Governor of Baghdad, used the citadel as his official residence. During this period, the citadel continued to function as both the governor's palace and a military centre. In 1633, the Tigris River flooded, reaching an orchard adjacent to the citadel. Ismail ibn Najm created a breach in the surrounding defenses, allowing floodwaters to enter the citadel and destroy parts of its walls.

In 1638, during Sultan Murad IV's reconquest of Baghdad, Ottoman forces besieged the citadel. During the siege, the citadel's gunpowder magazine exploded, causing parts of the structure to collapse. Following the Ottoman victory, Murad IV placed a large cannon at the citadel gate, locally as Abu Khazama, measuring approximately four meters in length with a muzzle diameter of around half a meter, it became associated with Murad IV's campaign to recover Baghdad from Persian control. A smaller cannon was also positioned at the entrance and was used for ceremonial salutes upon the arrival of the governor or the commander of the Janissary corps.

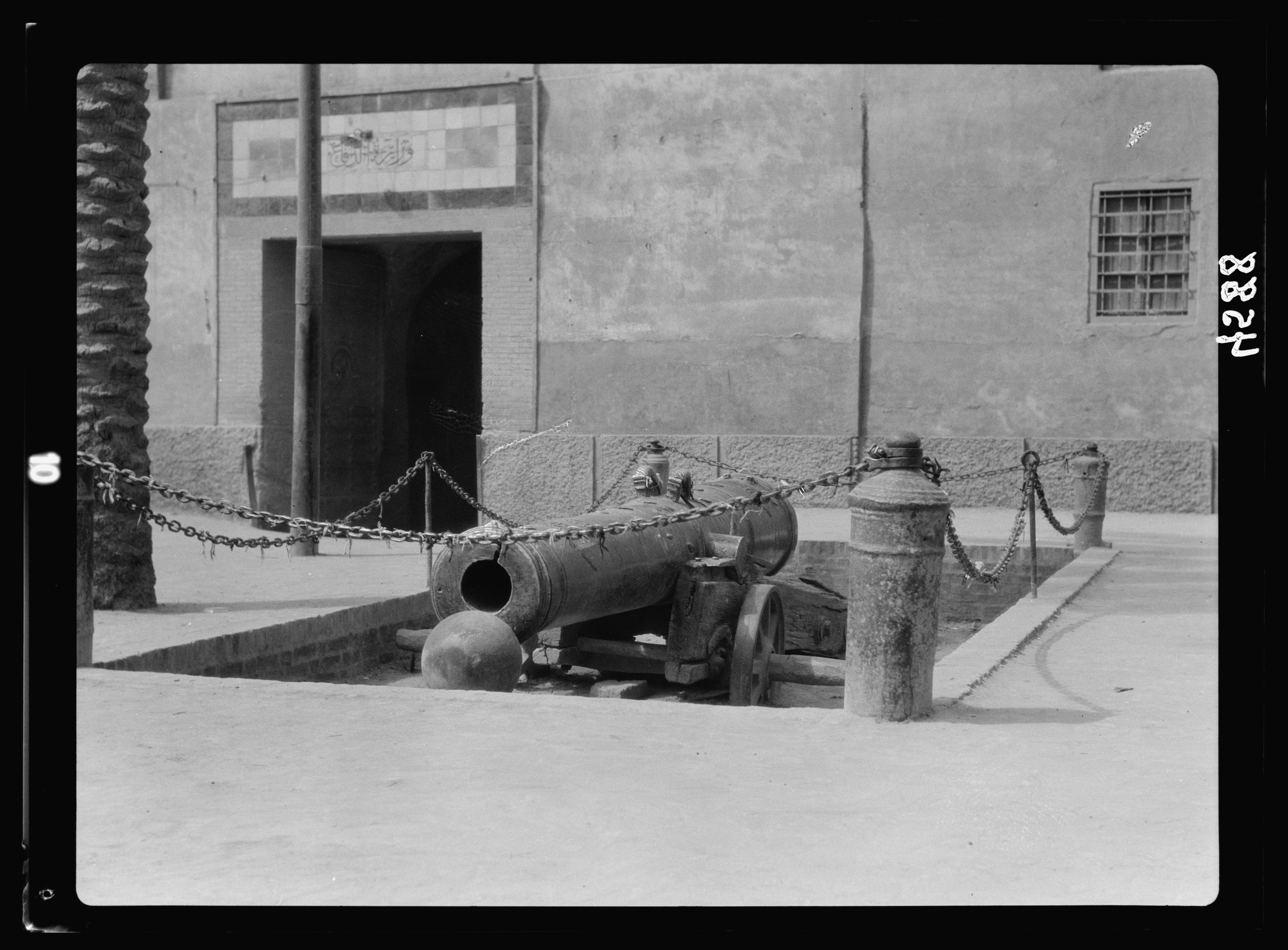
Abu Khazama cannon in 1932

The citadel was closely associated with the adjacent army barracks, which were constructed alongside the fortress and because the two structures served complementary military functions, their names were sometimes used interchangeably in historical accounts. Darwish Pasha resided in the barracks during his stint as Governor of Baghdad between 1638 to 1642.

In 1674, during the governorship of Abdi Pasha the Albanian, the citadel underwent renovation, including the reinforcement of its towers. The restoration strengthened its role as the headquarters for the defense of Baghdad and as the governor's residence. The citadel was constructed primarily from brick, while white stone was used for the outer walls. Contemporary sources noted similarities between the Citadel of Baghdad and the Inner Citadel of Mosul, with some accounts suggesting that both fortifications were constructed during the same period. It was subsequently called "Ahmed Pasha's Citadel", after his fortifications.

By 1685, the citadel reportedly contained approximately 2,191 cannons, demonstrating its importance as the principal Ottoman artillery stronghold in Baghdad.

=== Early Modern Period ===
1887 drawing of the citadel

In 1779, shortly after the Ottoman–Persian War, a revolt broke out in Baghdad against the Mamluk Pasha of Iraq, Hassan Pasha al-Kirkukli. During the uprising, the governor sought refuge inside the Inner Citadel. However, fearing the rebels, he escaped at night through the citadel's secret gate overlooking the Tigris River and crossed to al-Karkh.

After the Ottoman reconquest of Baghdad from the Mamluks of Iraq in 1831, the citadel continued to serve as the principal military headquarters and administrative stronghold of Baghdad. It also frequently functioned as the residence of the Ottoman governor, housing government offices, military facilities, and other administrative institutions in the nineteenth century.

The traveler Carsten Niebuhr, who visited Baghdad in 1834, described the citadel as a small fortress known as Çık Qala, located in the eastern corner of the city. He noted that it was primarily used as a gunpowder workshop and storage facility.

Between 1842 to 1847, Governor Muhammad Najib Pasha constructed the Garden of Ridván directly adjacent to the citadel. A ground plan of Baghdad surveyed by officers of the Royal Indian Navy in the 1854 depicts the citadel positioned across the city wall from the garden.

In 1849–1850, during the governorship of Minister Abd al-Karim Pasha, the citadel was completely rebuilt and its facilities renovated. This architectural renovation included the addition of a lush garden, surrounded by rivers and winding pathways within the citadel, all shaded by trees.

In 1851–1852, further modifications were made by Namiq Pasha. Some old buildings and markets were demolished, the courtyard was expanded and a large section of the city wall was incorporated into the citadel. Around the same time, the seat of government had moved from the citadel to the Qushla.

In 1870, the Ottoman governor Midhat Pasha ordered the demolition of Baghdad's old city walls, significantly altering the defensive landscape surrounding the citadel.

In the early 20th century, travelers Sarah and Ernst Herzfeld produced a map of Baghdad and its surrounding areas in which they labeled the fortress Qal'at al-Tubji (Topji Citadel), differing from the name "Inner Citadel of Baghdad" commonly used by Arab and foreign travellers and historians.

=== Post WWI ===
Indian troops entering the Citadel Gate in 1917.

During World War I, British forces entered Baghdad in 1917. A British officer climbed onto the roof of the citadel and raised the British flag over the fortress. However, after approximately forty-five minutes, the flag was moved to the Qishla clock tower, which stood at a higher elevation. In 1922, the citadel was restored, and the newly established Iraqi Ministry of Defense relocated to the complex, using it as its headquarters for military administration. The Provisions Department, formerly part of the military bakery, also transferred its warehouses to the citadel. Later, the Second Battery, the Accounting Department, and the al-Hashimi Battalion were relocated there.

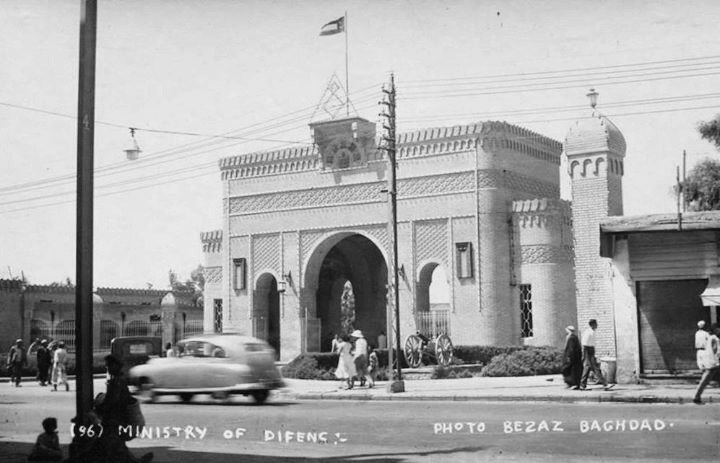
New defence ministry building in the 1930s

In 1929, most of the citadel's structures were demolished as part of Baghdad's urban expansion and modernization. The demolition included large sections of its walls, towers, and the main gate overlooking Al-Maidan Square, leaving only limited remains of the former fortress. A new defence ministry building was constructed in its place.

Only isolated architectural remains survive, including sections of wall located behind the al-Uzbek Mosque and adjacent to the People's Hall (Qa'at al-Sha'b), where the Mahdawi Court sessions were held in 1958.

== Gallery ==
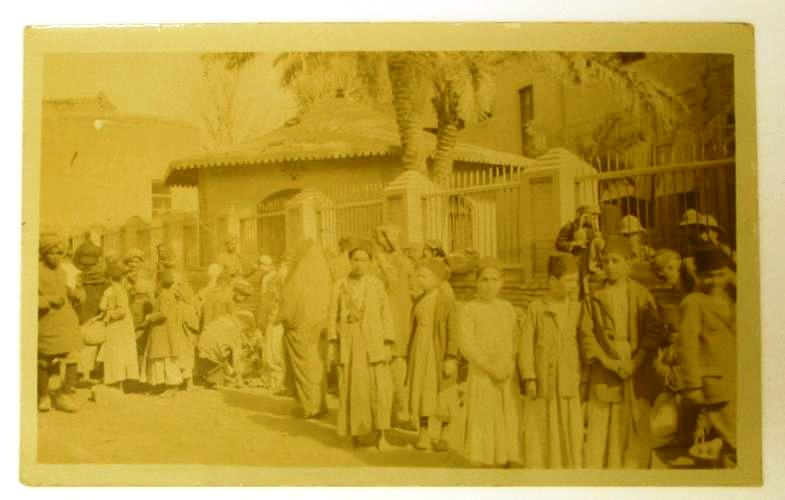
The citadel pictured during WWI with British soldiers in the background, 1916-1919

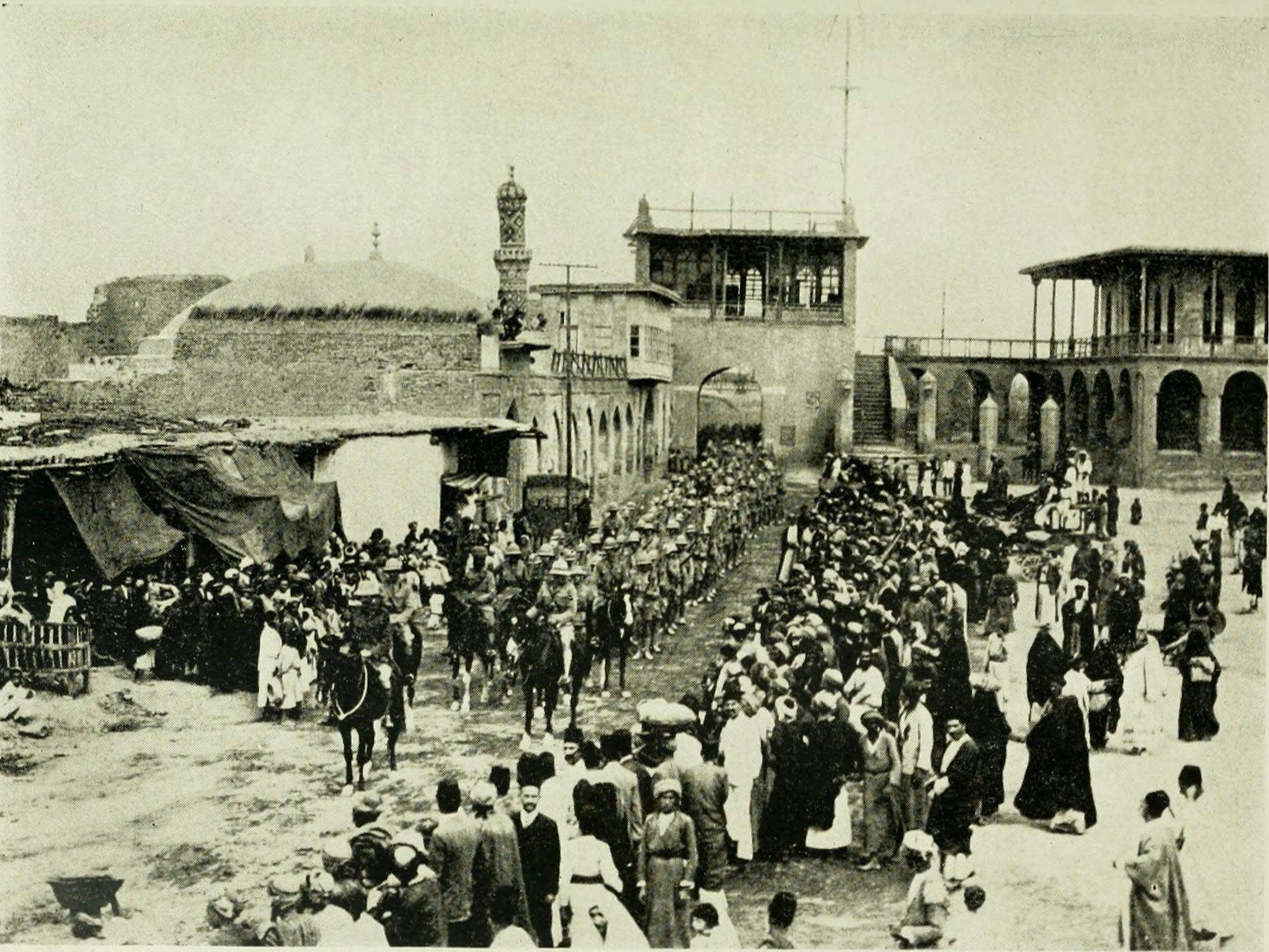
Sir Frederick Stanley Maude leads the Indian Army through the Citadel Gate, 1917

Indian sepoys guarding the gate of Baghdad Citadel, 1917

Abu Khazama Cannon in front of the citadel, before it was moved, 1918

Citadel of Baghdad in 1918

Abu Kazema postcard from 1952

== Maps ==
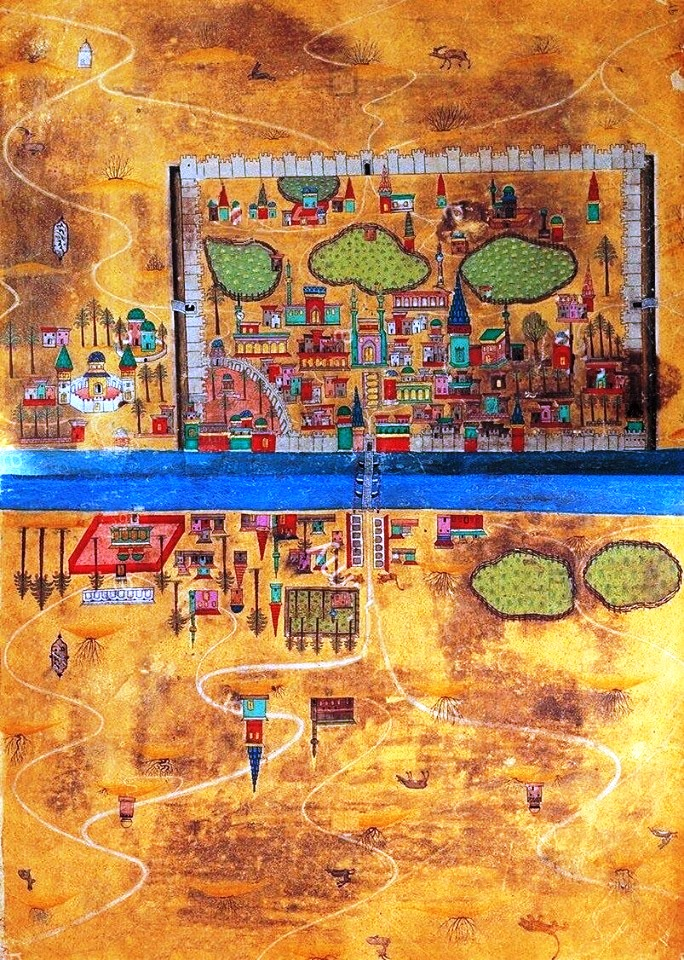
1500-1530

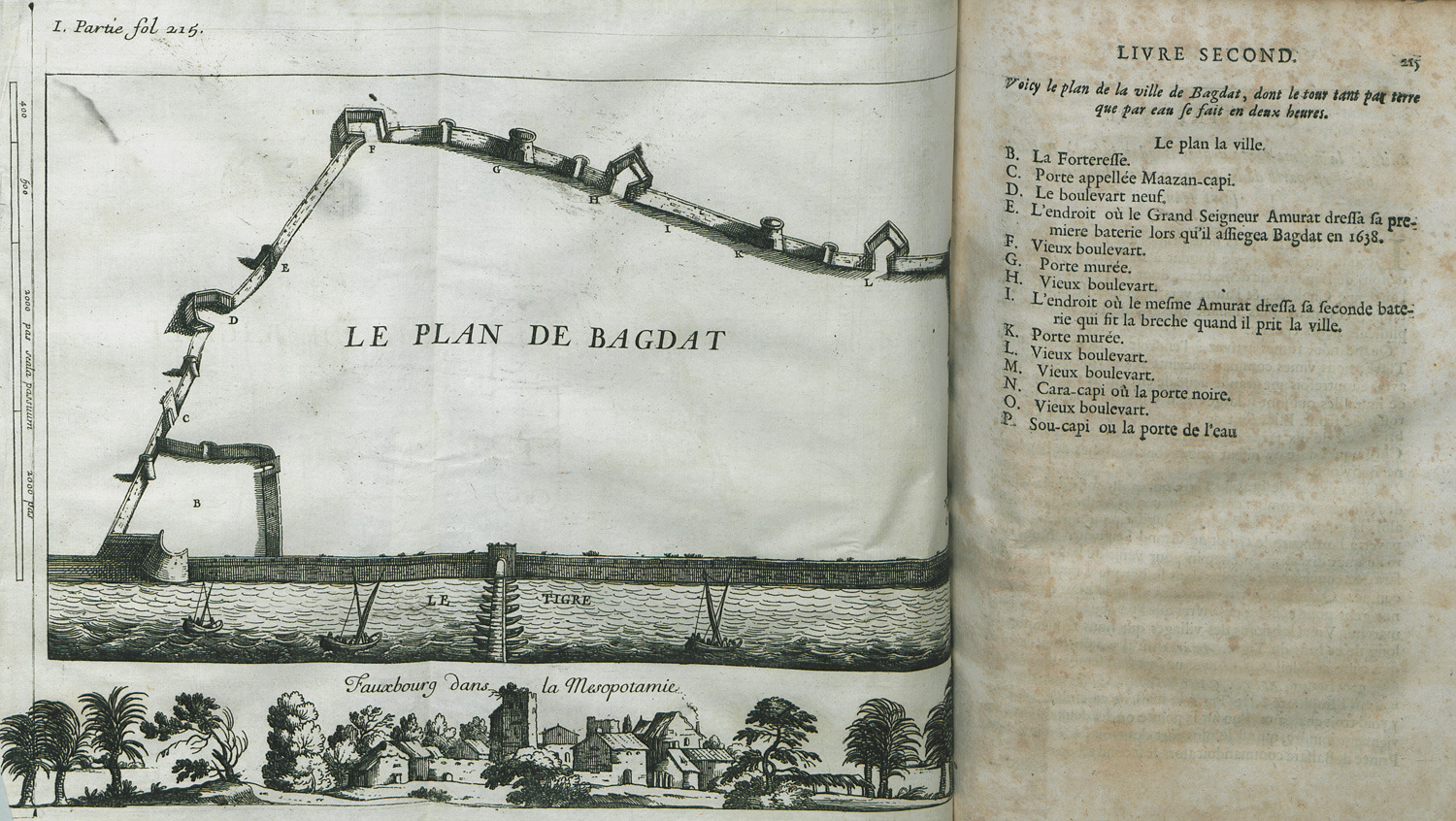
1677

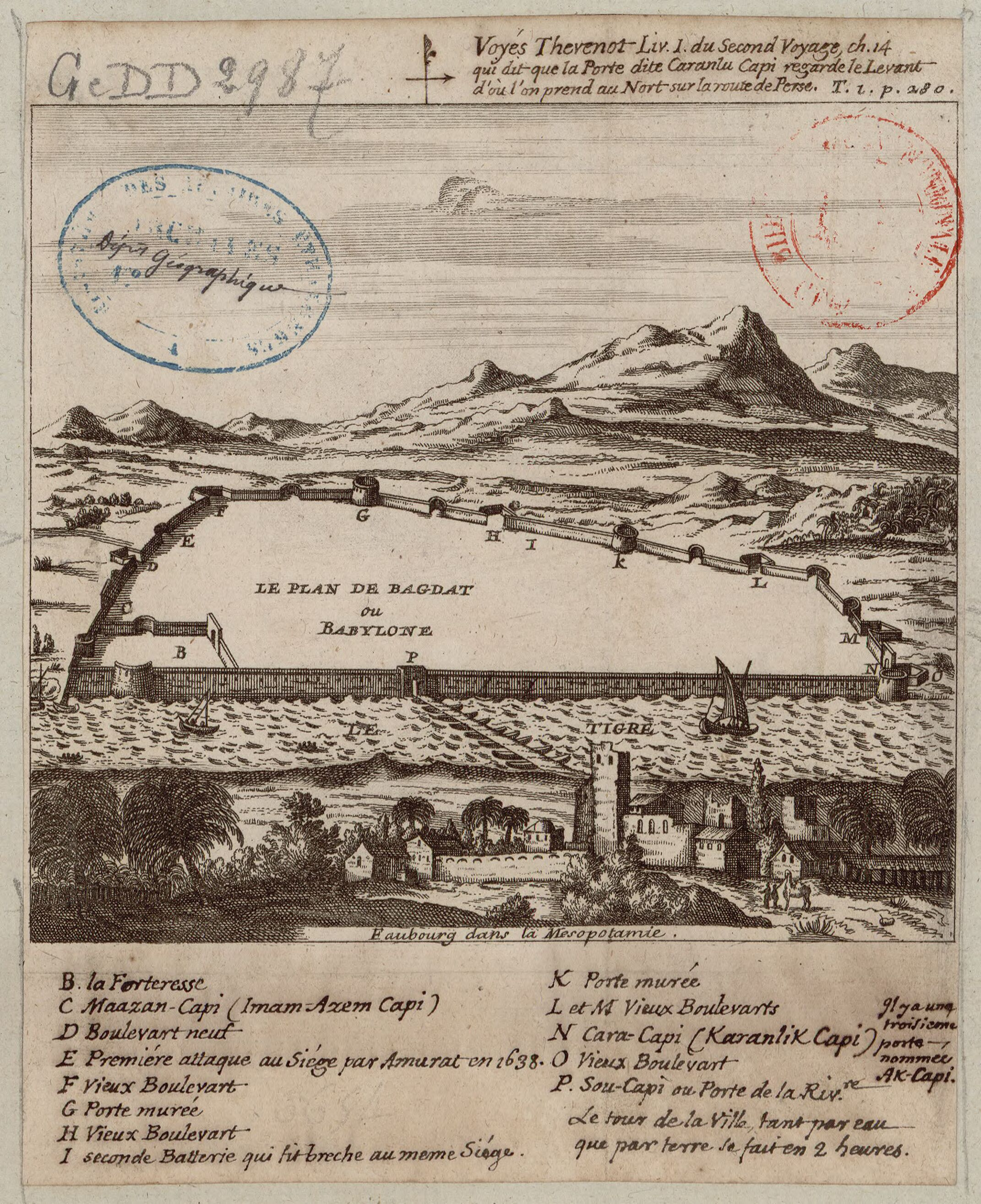
1677

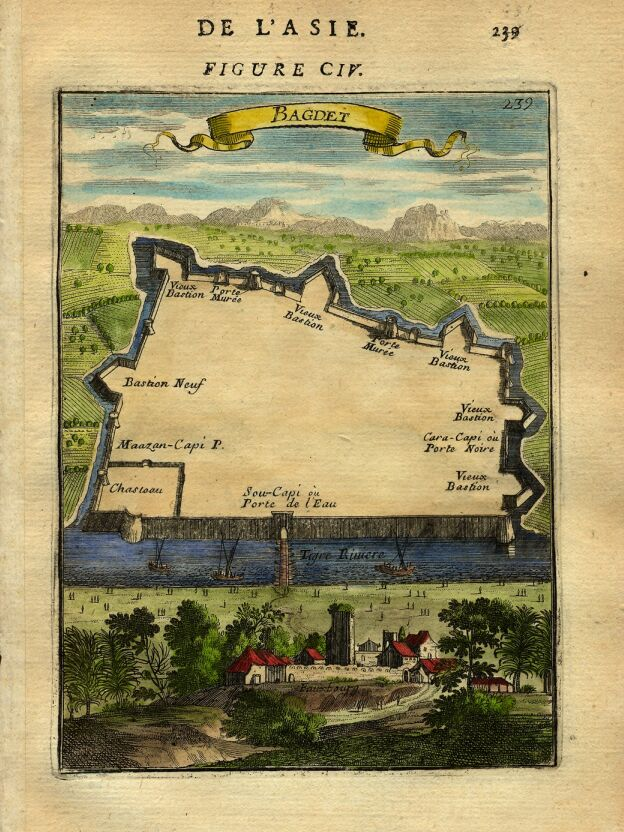
1683

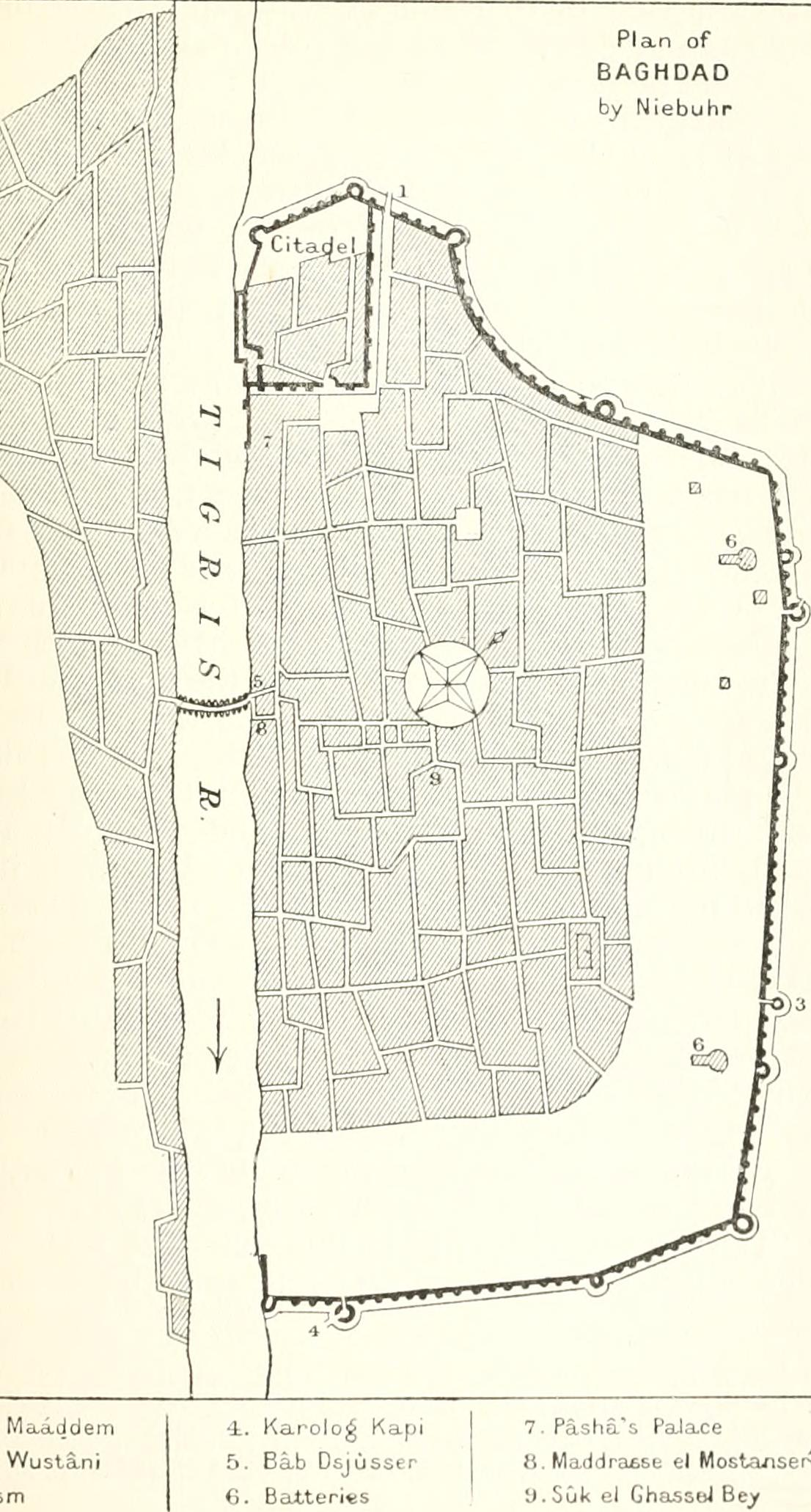
1775

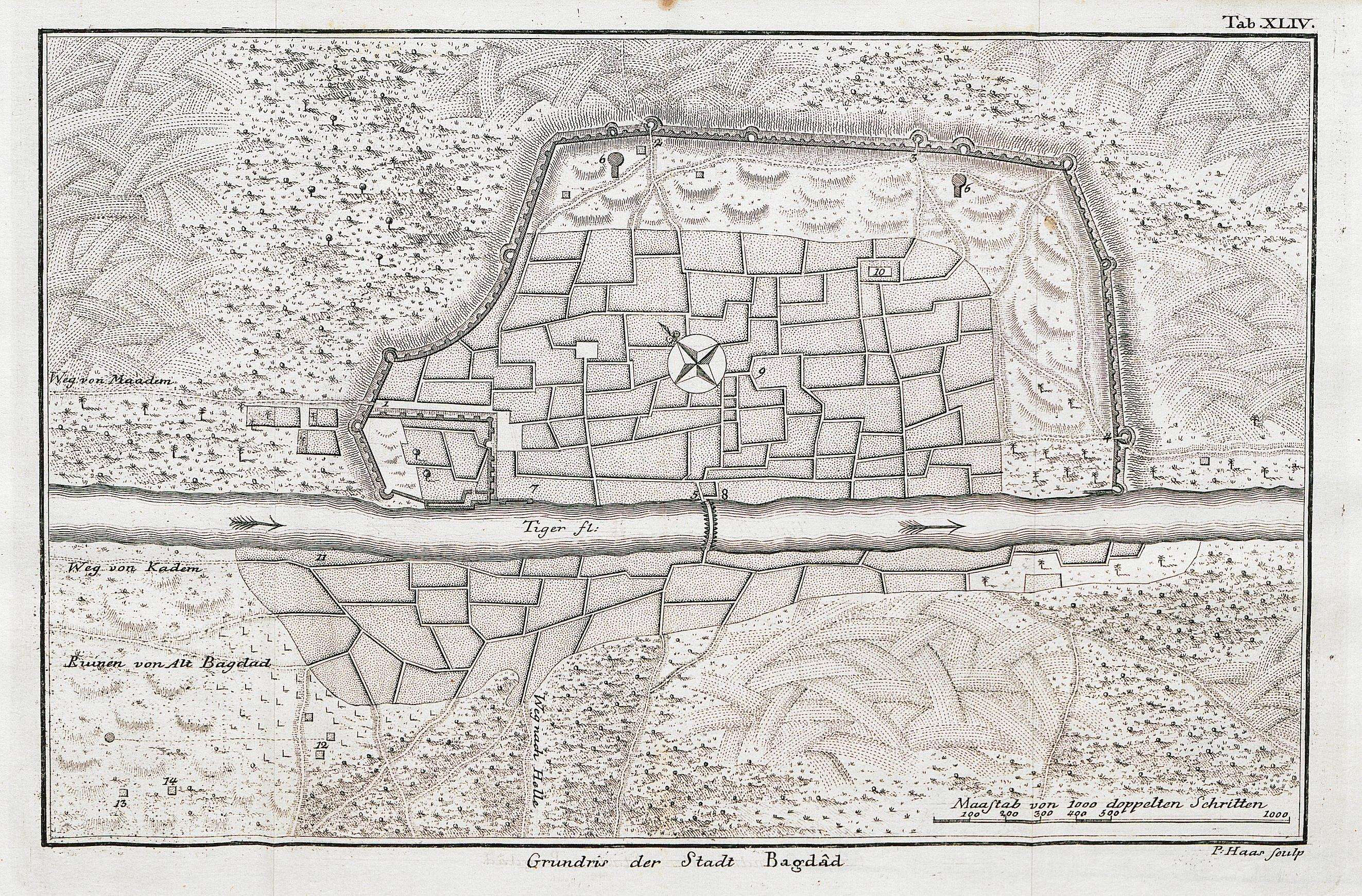
1778

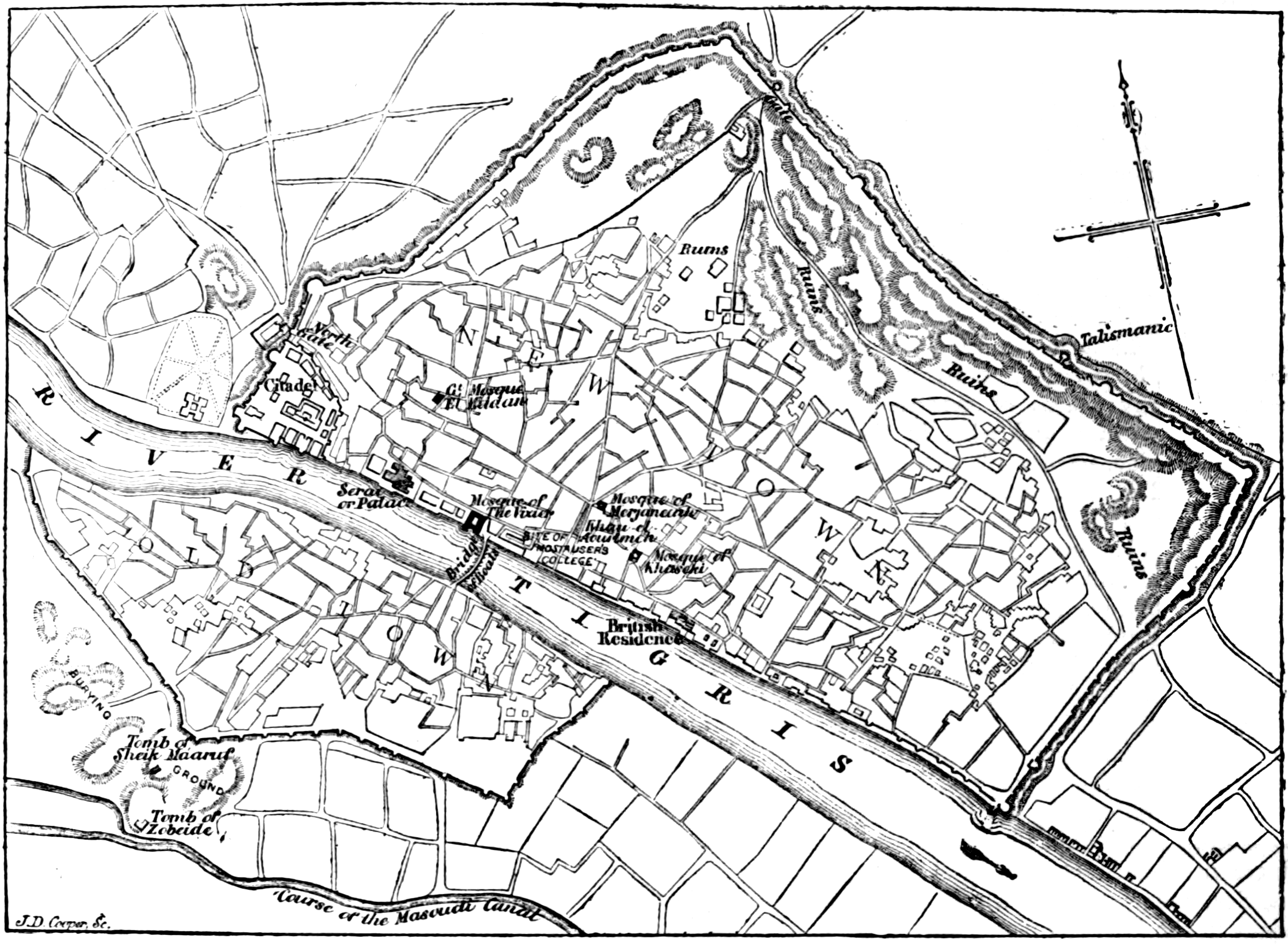
1853

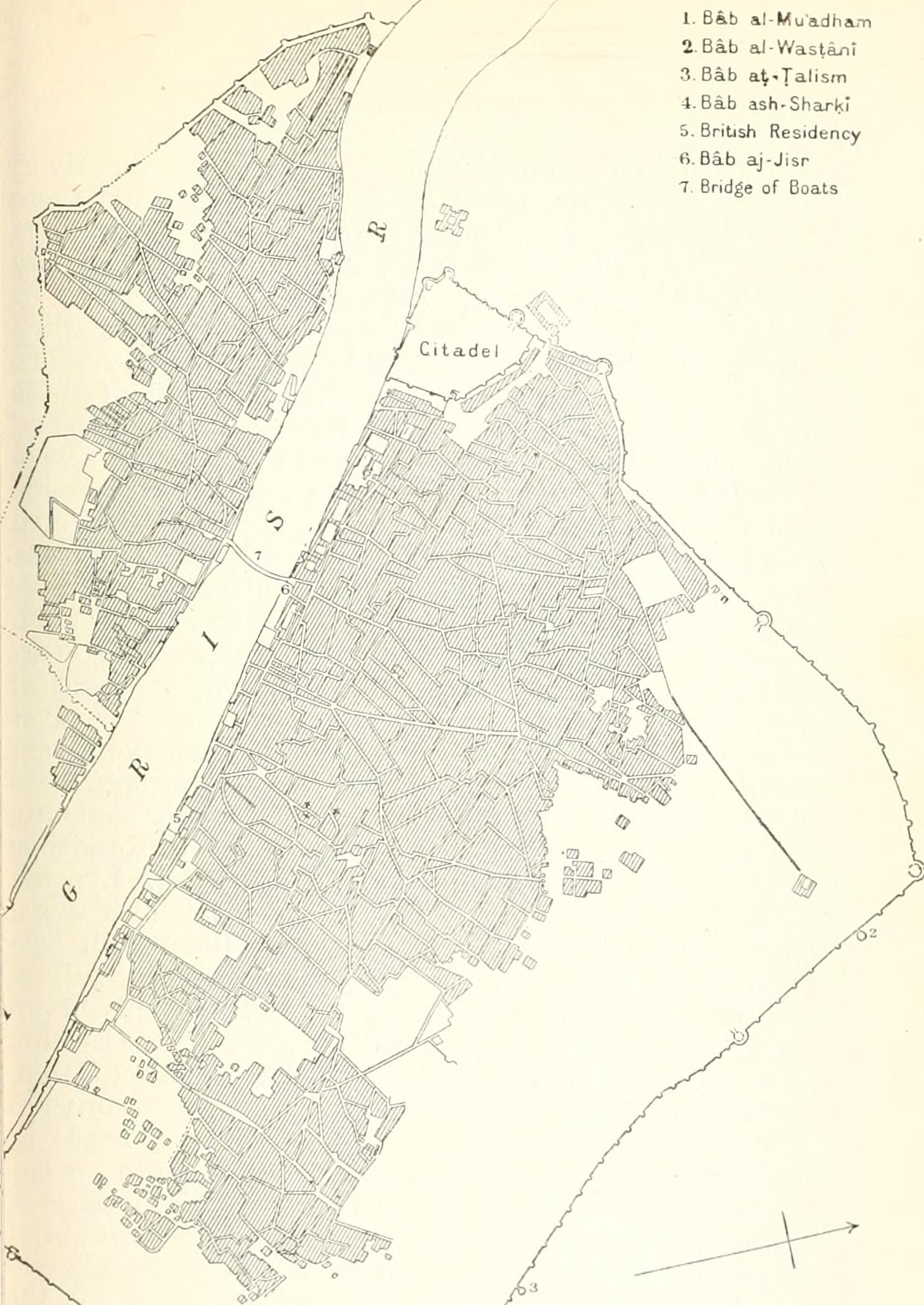
1888
