= Provisor =

Provisor may refer to:

Occupation

- Majordomo
- holder of a canonical provision
- Assistant to a bishop; see vicar general

Surname

- Ben Provisor (born 1990), American wrestler
- Dennis Provisor (born 1943), American musician and songwriter
- Leigh Jaynes (Leigh Jaynes Provisor), American wrestler

== See also ==
- Provision (disambiguation)
- Proviso (disambiguation)
