= Al-Aziziyah (Iraq) =

Town in Wasit Province, Iraq

Al-Aziziyah العزيزية
- Town
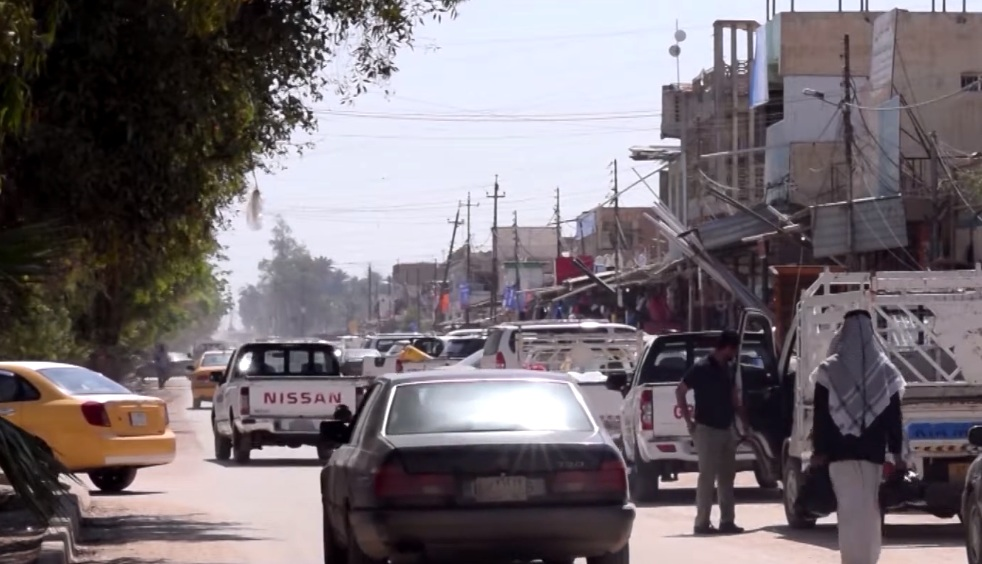
- Main street of Al-Aziziyah, April 2018

- Location within Iraq
- Coordinates: 32°54′30″N 45°4′0″E
- Country: Iraq
- Governorate: Wasit
- District: Al-Aziziyah District
- Established: 1866
- Elevation: 35 m (115 ft)

Population (2009)
  - Total: 44,868

Al-Aziziyah (Arabic: العزيزية) is an Iraqi town located in Wasit Province, on the left bank of the Tigris River. Located approximately 80 kilometers northwest of Kut, it is the administrative and political centre of Al-Aziziyah District. As of 2009, it had an estimated population of 44,868 citizens.

== History ==
It was established in 1866 by Ottoman Midhat Pasha, in honor of Sultan Abdülaziz. On 6 October 1915, English soldiers Percy Cox and Gerard Leachman met at Al-Aziziyah to discuss how to free Baghdad from the Ottomans.
