= Percy Cox =

British Indian Army general (1864–1937)

Sir Percy Cox
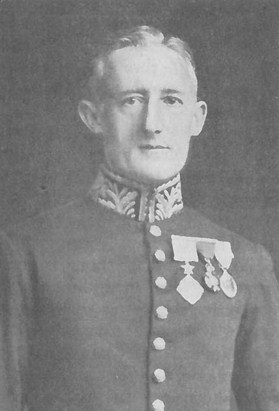
- Cox in 1916
- Born: 20 November 1864; Harwood Hall, Herongate, Essex, England
- Died: 20 February 1937 (aged 72); Melchbourne, Bedfordshire, England
- Military career
- Allegiance: United Kingdom
- Branch: British Army; British Indian Army
- Service years: 1884–1923
- Rank: Major-General
- Nicknames: Coccus; Kokus (Kokkus)
- Conflicts: First World War
- Awards: Knight Grand Cross of the Order of St Michael and St George; Knight Grand Commander of the Order of the Indian Empire; Knight Commander of the Order of the Star of India; Knight Commander of the Order of the British Empire

Major-General Sir Percy Zachariah Cox, GCMG, GCIE, KCSI, KBE, DL (20 November 1864 – 20 February 1937) was a British Indian Army officer and Colonial Office administrator in the Middle East. He is considered one of the main architects behind the current Middle Eastern borders.

== Family and early life ==
Cox was born in Harwood Hall, Herongate, Essex, one of seven children born to Julienne Emily (née Saunders) Cox and cricketer Arthur Zachariah Cox (né Button). He was educated initially at Harrow School where he developed interests in natural history, geography, and travel. In February 1884, being his father's third son and therefore without significant inheritance, Cox joined the Royal Military College, Sandhurst, and was commissioned as a Lieutenant into the Cameronians, joining their 2nd Battalion in India. In November 1889, an outstanding planner, he transferred to the Bengal Staff Corps. On 14 November 1889 he married Louisa Belle, youngest daughter of Irish-born surgeon-general John Butler Hamilton.

== British Somaliland and Muscat (1893–1903) ==
After holding minor administrative appointments in Kolhapur and Savantvadi in India, Cox was posted to British Somaliland, which was then administered from India, as Assistant Political Resident at Zeila. He transferred to Berbera in 1894. He was promoted to captain in February 1895. In May 1895 he was given command of an expedition against the Rer Hared clan, which had blocked trade routes and was raiding the coast. With only 52 Indian and Somali regulars and 1,500 poor quality, untrained local irregulars, he defeated the Rer Hared in six weeks. Later that year 1895, he was promoted to be assistant to the Viceroy of India's agent in Baroda.

For 1899 he had intended to join the US expedition under A Donaldson Smith between the River Nile and Lake Rudolf, but in October 1899, the new Viceroy of India, Lord Curzon appointed Cox Political Agent and consul at Muscat, Oman, inheriting a tense situation between the British, French and Arabs who regarded the area as under their influence. The French had leased a coaling station from Sultan Feisal, the local ruler, for the French Navy. The French also gave protection to the local slave trade, which the British opposed. Feisal was ordered by the British under Cox to board the British merchantman SS Eclipse, whose guns were trained on his palace and reprimanded and informed that his annual subsidy could be withdrawn by the British government.

Cox managed to successfully end French influence in the area; turning the subsidy around, and agreeing that Feisal's son could receive an education in England and visit the Delhi Durbar. When Lord Curzon visited Muscat in 1903, he judged that Cox virtually ran the place. Cox was promoted to the rank of major on 6 February 1902, and was invested Companion of the Order of the Indian Empire in the 1902 Coronation Honours; whereas Feisal was rewarded for loyalty with Knight Grand Commander of the Order of the Indian Empire in Curzon's gift.

== Political Resident in Persian Gulf (1904–1919) ==
In June 1904, Major Cox was appointed first British Acting Political Resident in the Persian Gulf and Consul-General for Fars province, Lurestan and Khuzestan and the district of Lingah, residing in the Persian side of the gulf at the city of Bushehr. He began a remarkable correspondence and friendship with Captain William Shakespear, appointed Cox's deputy Political Resident to Persia. Their frank exchange of views at Bandar Abbas was a major element of pre-war policy in the near east. Cox considered peace the priority, in the maintenance of good relations with the Ottomans, who held all the tribal loyalties, whilst prompting India to change policy towards Ibn Saud, the Wahhabi ruler of Nejd and later king of Saudi Arabia, from 1906.

One of the few allies was Shaikh Mubarak of Kuwait, whose shared intelligence eventually aided the desert war. Cox was assiduous with his briefs: he prepared in great detail, in fluent Arabic, when he wrote Shaikhs. Warned by the former ambassador to Constantinople of Turkish escalation; preparations were made to make Arabian friends. British forces were called into Bushehr in 1909, and then again to Shiraz in 1911. Cox promised Sheikh Khazal of Muhammarah that troops would protect when the Turks threatened to invade. Khazaal leased the Shatt al-Arab waterway on the Euphrates to the Anglo-Persian Oil Company for the construction of refineries. In 1910 Cox wrote a full report on Shakespear's findings to India, which was passed to London. He was promoted to Lieutenant-colonel in February 1910. Cox promoted trade in the Persian Gulf which doubled between 1904 and 1914, suppressed the illegal arms trade; and improved communications. In the 1909 Birthday Honours Cox was appointed a Companion of the Order of the Star of India (CSI), and in the 1911 Delhi Durbar Honours he was created a Knight Commander of the Order of the Indian Empire. In 1908 oil fields were discovered in the region of Abadan. On 16 July 1909, after secret negotiation with Cox, assisted by Arnold Wilson, Sheik Khaz'al agreed to a rental agreement for the island including Abadan. (Note: The agreement gave £1,500 per year and £16,500 in gold sovereigns to the Sheik.)

He was confirmed as Resident, a post which he occupied highly successfully until 1914, when he was appointed Secretary to the British Raj. Cox feared reprisals in Arabia would make the tribes turn towards Germany. But the Foreign Office was engrossed with events in Europe. Among his other achievements while at Bushire was the establishment of the state of Kuwait as an autonomous kaza within the Ottoman Empire by the Anglo-Ottoman Convention of 1913, where he improved relations with local ruler, Mubarak, by opening negotiations with Ibn Saud.

The Turks signed a treaty in London on 29 July 1913 concerning Royal Navy patrols in the Persian Gulf littoral, when Cox met then at the Port of Uqair on 15 December 1913. Cox noted their "intractability" and also warned the Foreign and Commonwealth Office about Ibn Saud; the "increased authority of the Wahhabi Chief". Captain Shakespear's letter had passed via Riyadh to the Suez Canal in which his secret War-camp negotiations with Ibn Sa'ud, had revealed the latter's deep hatred of the Turks, who brutalised his people and threatened his ancestral rights. Shortly after his return to India, Sir Percy was sent back to the Persian Gulf as Chief Political Officer with the Indian Expeditionary Force when World War I broke out in August 1914, still with a brief to prevent Turkish entry on the German side. The Islamic Jihad to crush the British and seize Mesopotamia coincided with Turkey's declaration of war in October 1914.

Ibn Saud's mortal enemy, Ibn Rashid, was in the Turkish coalition. Cox sent his deputy to protect Ibn Saud, whose army was attacked at the Battle of Jarrab on 24 January 1915. Shakespear was in command of the artillery when he was charged down and killed in the melee. Sir Percy received immediate authorisation to draft a Treaty of Khufaisa with the Wahhabi ruler with the aim of forming a broader Arab alliance. By April 1915 Cox was based at Basrah where he received a significant Treaty between Ibn Saud and his enemy Ibn Rashid; partition of Arabia in a spirited alliance to rid the peninsula of the Ottomans. They finally met on Boxing Day 1915 at Darin, an island of Tarut, in the bay of Qatif, just north of Bahrain, where they signed the Treaty of Darin.

=== A local difficulty in Mesopotamia ===
Cox was Secretary to the Government of India, its chief civil servant, and third in order of precedence. (Note: behind the Viceroy and Commander-in-Chief Forces, India at Indian Army Headquarters; a role Sir Henry Wilson and CIGS Lord Robertson took away from Lord Hardinge) He was despatched to the Gulf as Chief Political Officer with the rank of honorary major-general. The arrival of General Nixon from Simla was "shabby...jobbing" as the military build-up enclosing India's plan to capture Baghdad troubled the veteran political time-servers, morally responsible to humanity and to civilization.

For want of a more bland administration, Cox complained to Viceroy Lord Curzon that Barrett, whom Nixon replaced, had not wanted to go to Amara in pursuit of a policy of annexation. In a surprise attack upriver on Qurna before midnight on 6 December 1914, Commander Nunn and a small fleet managed to link up with Brigadier Fry's units of the 45th to force the Turk to surrender; ultimately, by land and by sea, a typical pincer movement in combined operations enabled only 45 officers and 989 men to take a garrison of 4,000 men. At 1.30 pm on 9 December, Sir Percy and Fry took the formal handover from Head of Vilayet, Vali of Basra, Subhi Bey, ending the Battle of Qurna. Cox was not one for sentimentality: but the Turkic rulers had been guilty of several barbarisms: stoning women, and severing thieves' hands off; traitors and spies were buried up to their necks in sand.

During 1915 he saw action with Major General Charles Townshend's expeditionary force. Throughout the Great War Cox masterminded the Imperial relationship with Turkic Mesopotamia/Iraq. By December 1915, Townshend's division had been defeated at Battle of Ctesiphon and retreated to be besieged in Kut al-Amara. Cox left with Brigadier Leachman's cavalry brigade sent back to Basra. General Townshend came to hate "this accursed country"; fly-blown. Historians point to his brilliant defence of the fort at Chitral on the North-West Frontier in 1895, as evidence of suitability for appointment. Townshend, although promised a relief force from Nixon, knew that it was an unrealistic prospect. Although substantial redoubts were constructed during September to December 1915, the cross-river route remained vulnerable to attack. Townshend blamed Cox for the failure to evacuate civilians in time. Cox was firmly against exposing them to the winter cold. In this assessment he was supported by Arnold Wilson, who wrote that a general was not competent to judge what protection civilians needed. On reflection Cox suggested that the 500 departing unit should turn back; but Colonel Gerard Leachman told him the roads being drenched and muddy were impassable. These men had left on 6 December to be transported downriver to safety. 2,000 would-be fit cavalry men and officers remained behind with the infantry.

== Influence in Iraq ==
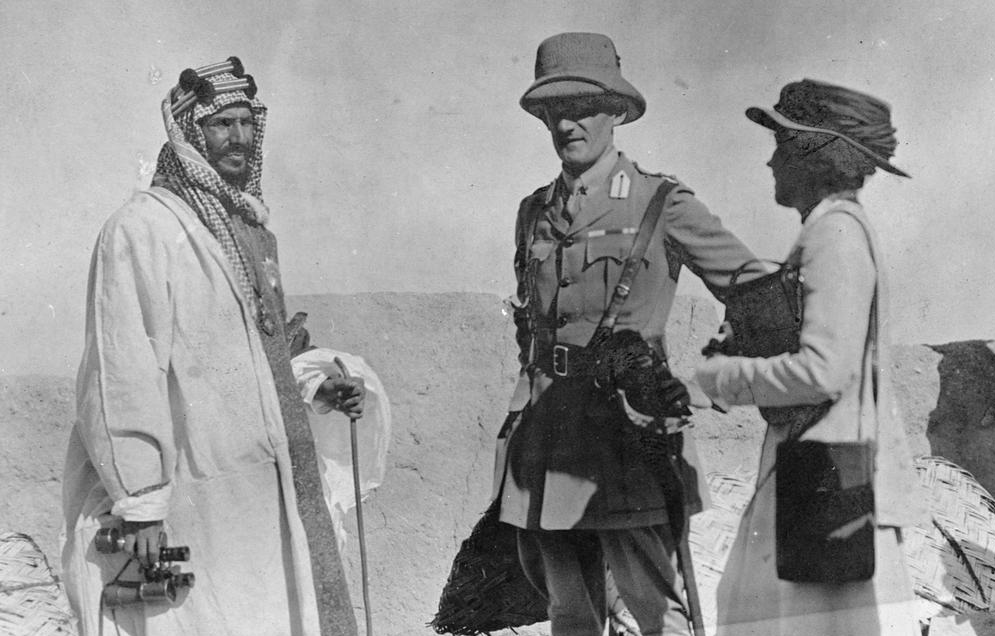
Cox and Gertrude Bell with Abdul Aziz Ibn Sa'ud, during the Arab Revolt, Basrah, 1916

Aged 25, Cox first travelled in the Middle East. In 1915 he was sent by the British army to negotiate: On 6 October he met Leachman at Aziziyeh to discuss how to free Baghdad. An emissary was sent into the city to see Nuri al-Said. The Iraqi commander in the pay of the Ottomans was responsible to Talaat Pasha, one of the Young Turks whose coup d'état had seized power in Constantinople/Istanbul. Cox was deeply sceptical about "conciliating with the Arabs".

Nuri's Basra Reform Society were negotiating with Cox when the British appointed the violent and intemperate Sayyid Talib as governor of the province. He was eager to work with the Imperial forces, but was deeply unpopular with local Shias. Cox ordered Talib and Nuri to be arrested; they were promptly deported to prison in India for treasonous attempts to stir up revolt. The general turned statesman-diplomat disapproved of army plans to extend the autonomous region; advising against plans to invade into the interior, which he knew to be fraught with dangers. In January 1915, Sir John Nixon's appointment to head a new division with orders from Shimla encouraged the diplomat to draft a similar text for General Nixon that launched the fateful mission to Kut al-Amara. (Note: according to historian Charles Townshend, the originator was probably the intellectual and skilful career diplomat and not the troubled General) "This would create endless problems for Great Britain..." wrote Gerard Leachman in March 1915, explorer, traveller from India.

Cox early on spotted the important alliance that lay with Ibn Saud. In his capacity as the senior Foreign and Commonwealth Office official, Cox received secret intelligence reports on Ottoman troop movements. In his dealings he was "stoic, patient and tolerant, never allowing any hint of frustration no matter how perverse the commands of his government or the action of his people...".

In January 1915, he was alerted to the Banu Lam and Bani Turuf tribes mobilising for war, declaring Jihad in Persia. Cox was confident that "Qurna was strong" and would hold against an assault. It was imperative to protect the oil pipelines into the Gulf at Abadan; the government ordered a brigade to this duty. Cox was well aware from his own experiences of the vulnerability of the frontier. He was highly respected as a quick, efficient, tireless and energetic soldier-diplomat, as well as being incorruptible. He held a genuine interest in local people, the Arabs and Persians, and was a shrewd and patient listener. As a politician he was a good speaker of Arabic and Turkish. But he knew when to shut up: he kept silent often in the Bedu presence, yet knew when to speak up, which impressed the Arab sensibilities. To Gertrude Bell he became an indispensable and close friend; whom she fondly admired.

By 1914, Cox was a champion of Arab nationalism, working closely with Gertrude Bell, and T. E. Lawrence to that end. During April 1916, Kitchener offered a series of blatant bribes up to £2 million via General Halil "to the people of Kut", disgusted Cox left with Leachman's cavalry brigade sent back to Basra. Gertrude Bell reported she was staying with Sir Percy and Lady Cox in March 1916, living next door to the Military GHQ. On 8 March, Cox had returned from Bushire wherefore gathering intelligence. By May, George Lloyd had joined the unit from London because their work was "political not military," the "Egyptian link" being with the new Arab Bureau.

=== Triumph and capture of Baghdad ===
Cox's main priority was to protect and prevent Ibn Saud from joining the Turkish side in the war. He met the Arab Sheikh at Al-Ahsa Oasis where a Treaty was signed guaranteeing a subsidy of £5,000 per month. Cox knew that Sir Mark Sykes was the champion of Sharif Husein, a rival candidate for the desert kingdoms. The delicate diplomatic balance arose as General Maude took Baghdad in March 1917; and Allenby Jerusalem that December. Taking part in the campaigns in Mesopotamia and Palestine, he was promoted to Honorary Major-General in May 1917. During this time he established strong relations with Ibn Saud, the powerful ruler of the Nejd, with whom he had already had dealings while Resident, and when he gained the nickname Kokus. (Note: "The word Kokus is rapidly passing into Arabic language, not as a name but as a title. You are a Kokus, just as once upon a time you were a Chosroes or a Pharaoh" (Gertrude to Herbert Bell, 8 June 1917.(Bell 1927b, p. 414)) Cox was mentioned in despatches in August 1917, and promoted to Knight Grand Cross of the Order of the Indian Empire (GCIE) that month, in recognition of meritorious service during the war.

For the next year Cox was of central importance to the Government of Baghdad, living in a large house where he entertained high society Sheikhs; the arrival of Fahad Bey, Sheikh of Amareh, and others instilled confidence in the British Residency. On 8 September 1918, he visited Tehran, for the first time. The negotiations largely completed Cox was installed as Britain's first ambassador at Tehran in November 1918. At the end of hostilities with the Ottoman Empire, Cox was appointed Acting Minister in Tehran, negotiating the Anglo-Persian Agreement. That winter he returned to Europe, attending the Versailles Peace Conference in 1919. Cox was appointed a Knight Commander of the Order of St Michael and St George (KCMG) in the 1920 New Year Honours.

== Appointment as High Commissioner of Iraq and Iraqi Revolt (1920) ==
Following the Iraqi Revolt of 1920, British colonial administrators felt a more effective and cheaper method to rule the area would be to create an Iraqi government in which British influence was less visible. It was in this environment that Sir Percy Cox took up residence in Baghdad as the first High Commissioner under the Iraqi Mandate, travelling via Kut el-Amara.

Later, reflecting on Britain's new policy and the difficulties involved, Cox wrote to Lady Bell:

The task before me was by no means an easy or attractive one. The new line of policy which I had come to inaugurate involved a complete and necessarily rapid transformation of the facade of the existing administration from British to Arab and, in the process, a wholesale reduction in the numbers of British and British-Indian personnel employed.

Acting as High Commissioner, Cox collaborated with former Ottoman officials and tribal, sectarian, and religious leaders and oversaw the creation of a largely Arab provisional government, or "Council of State," with the purpose of seeing the young country through the turbulent period following the revolt. Cox selected as president the (Sunni) religious leader Abd Al-Rahman Al-Gillani, the Naqib of Baghdad. Council members were culled from local elites whom Cox felt could be relied upon to support the British agenda. The satisfactory functioning of this interim government allowed Cox to attend the Cairo Conference, convened by the new Colonial Secretary Winston Churchill in 1921.

== The 1921 Cairo Conference and the crowning of King Faisal ==
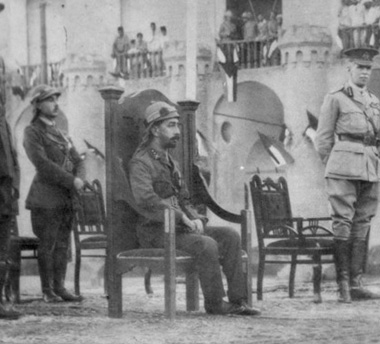
Coronation of Faisal as King of Iraq. Faisal seated, to his right are British High commissioner Percy Cox and Lieutenant Kinahan Cornwallis, to his left commander-in-chief of all British troops in the Mesopotamia Commander General Aylmer Haldane.

Among the points Cox considered salient coming into the 1921 Cairo Conference was the reduction of British spending in Iraq and the selection of a ruler for the country. To satisfy the first item, Cox proposed a plan to cut immediately expenditure and withdraw troops from Mesopotamia. On the question of who should rule Iraq, Cox considered the best option to be one of the sons of the Sharif of Mecca, with whom the British had a special relationship during the war due to promises made during the McMahon–Hussein Correspondence. At the conference, the Sharif's son Faisal emerged as the preferred choice, with Cox noting that Faisal's military experience in World War I as well as his vast political skills made him the most qualified to raise an army and rule Iraq effectively.

Cox would later write that the decision in favour of Faisal was "easiest to arrive at ... by the process of elimination," reasoning that local candidates for the throne would split the support of the major parties in Iraq while Faisal, as a result of his experience and his respected family name, would enjoy the "general if not the universal support of inhabitants." After arranging an election of sorts of Faisal's asking, Cox would go on to proclaim Faisal as King of Iraq on 23 August 1921 in Baghdad, upon which event the provisional cabinet formed by Cox resigned.

...For some time past letters have been passing between Sir Percy and Ibn Saud The Conquest of Hayil by the latter in November makes his frontiers continuous with the Iraq. Sir Percy is anxious to arrange a treaty between him and Faisal.

Cox was promoted to Knight Grand Cross of the Order of St Michael and St George (GCMG) in the 1922 New Year Honours. For his remaining years as the High Commissioner of Iraq, Cox continued to greatly influence Iraqi government and events in the country, using his power behind the throne to advise and put pressure on Faisal where necessary, including lavish festivities. On 2 June 1922, King Faisal's court was entertained at the High Commissioner's residency in Baghdad to celebrate the royal birthday. In his subsequent eulogy on his friend Gertrude's death, Cox recalled that 'On 20 April 1923 a treaty was signed with Turkey with proviso that "Nothing in this Protocol shall prevent a fresh agreement from being concluded...and negotiations shall be entered into between them before expiration of the above period." The parenthesis did not preclude the uncovering and exposure of the fraudulent Protocols of the Elders of Zion, later used by the Nazis, which International Jewry explicitly refuted. Yet the San Remo Treaty with Turkey included explicit acceptance of the British Mandate of Palestine – the Zionist home land. (Note: extract Protocol IX, The Protocols of the Wise Men of Zion, pp. 156–58, 163 – The Protocol IX tried to imply a 'carve-up' of Palestinian territory in which the principle was implicitly agreed to in 1914 by British High Commissioner Sir Herbert Samuel, whilst simultaneously deliberately attributing anti-semitism as a means of control and for the separate existence of Jews.)

== Remaining term as High Commissioner of Iraq, Ambassador in Baghdad (1920–1923) ==
King Feisal's election had been confirmed by referendum in July 1921. British executive officers were removed from power. On 23 August 1922, King Faisal was struck with appendicitis and rendered unable to rule for several weeks. At this moment, a debate was raging over the nature and extent of British control over Iraqi affairs through treaty obligations. In perhaps the boldest action of his political career, Cox seized control and instituted direct British rule. Cox, in effect, became acting King of Iraq and undertook such measures as jailing and transporting those hostile to foreign intervention; silencing opposition parties and media; and even ordering the bombing of tribal insurgents.

Interpretation of these events varies greatly depending on the source: John Townsend writes that Cox's actions "demonstrated British infallibility, illusory though it might have been" and that what transpired amounted to "perhaps [Cox's] greatest single achievement." Ahmad Shikara is not as kind, calling Cox's measures "severe and unpopular" and noting that Faisal himself held "strong objections to the High Commissioner's actions." Cox's own account contradicts, as he writes that not only were his actions necessary for the stability of the state, but that Faisal, upon recovery, "thanked me cordially for the action taken during the interregnum." Whatever the case, Cox's actions succeeded in preserving the status quo for the British, and Faisal resumed his rule in September after being a reluctant signatory to a twenty-year treaty.

== Acting Political Resident at Tehran ==
Cox was the acting British Minister in Tehran when the Anglo-Iranian Agreement was concluded on 9 August 1919. He exchanged formal letters with Vosuq. The Iranians wanted three main concessions: territory, trade and tariff agreements all to be accepted. Iran did not necessarily share with Britain their multi-country approach to diplomacy. (Note: But Oliver Bast makes it clear that had always been characteristic of their national negotiating style.) The first approach made to Britain was at the Paris Conference. The Iranians wanted to adopt Wilsonian self-determination principles. The Empire provided loans, financial and military expertise, and infrastructure development e.g. building ports, harbours, bridges and railways. By the end of September 1919, the situation had worsened for the Whites, and so Vosuq approached the British embassy, while Firuz in Paris spoke to the British ambassador. In London Curzon warned the Russians off Iran, after Firuz's visit had concluded only five days before on 15 October 1919. Vosuq would make himself the class enemy by siding with Britain. In October 1919 a special mission warned the Whites off Baku. And the following month Cox requested British troops to defend the province of Khorasan. Cox's relations with the Persians were somewhat spare. On the one hand the vast country was supposedly acting as a barrier to Russian threats of invasion and Turkish activity in Mesopotamia, and on the other it was a long way from both India and London. The Foreign Secretary, Lord Curzon was forced to write to Cox on 17 May 1920, that there was little or no military help that could be sent to the small British mission.

Meanwhile, Britain attempted to secure guarantees from the Soviets that territorial integrity of Britain's trading and military interests in the region would be respected. Curzon was far from happy that any negotiations should be entered with Soviet Russia. They could not be trusted, and so he simply failed to inform Cox that the Iranians would be negotiating a separate pre-arranged treaty. The Persians were themselves apprehensive about their own prospects; and Curzon typically toughed it out with stiff upper lip, reassuring Cox that things would work out. But Curzon thought that trade embargoes and sanctions were the way to put pressure on Russia. What was worse for Curzon, was Firuz contentment with turning instead to France for help. Their agreement was dubbed renversement des alliances – an oblique reference to the perceived snub to British interests. In Tehran they sang the praises of French Foreign Minister, Stephen Pichon. If Curzon was said to be arrogant, it was because he was more aware than most of the consequences for India of destabilizing the region by powers seeking the oil.

The new Prime Minister of Iran was now obliged to continue an agenda already set by his predecessor, to conclude the Anglo-Persian Agreement on Oil. But the British were posed with a constitutional impasse: how could Parliament ratify an agreement when the Russian invaders now occupied the territory? The Iranians were content to reciprocate by demanding the removal of British contingents, to be placatory to Moscow at the end of the year from 3 December 1920.

=== A conclusion for the kingdoms of the east? ===
The remainder of Cox's term as High Commissioner was spent negotiating the Anglo-Iraqi Treaty, years 1921 and 1922, which established "the infant State of Iraq". Faisal's objection to the British Mandate of Iraq and his insistence on formal independence were in need of a fine diplomatic touch. Britain wished to keep its interests alive in Iraq while at the same time appearing to have no control over its government.

To this end, Cox negotiated the Anglo-Iraqi Treaty, which forced many of the original terms of the Mandate system on Iraq but avoided the term "mandate" and granted British protection to Faisal against rivals such as Ibn Saud. This treaty was signed on 10 October 1922; but not before an incident in August in the Palace grounds that amounted to an attempted coup d'état against the High Commissioner. In his absence the Naqib of Baghdad had signed a number of complaints for opponents. They were immediately arrested for treason. Shortly thereafter, Cox utilized his good relationship with Ibn Saud at Uqair to establish the boundaries between the Saudi kingdom, Iraq, and Kuwait in order to ensure that Britain would not have to defend Iraq from the Saudis. He was appointed GCMG. In her letters, the famed adventurer, archaeologist, and author Gertrude Bell writes of the effectiveness of Cox's diplomacy: "Ibn Saud is convinced that the future of himself and his country depends on our goodwill and that he will never break with us. In point of fact the treaty is on exactly the lines that Sir Percy stipulated." This was to be Cox's final significant act as High Commissioner since he retired on 4 May 1923 and was succeeded by Sir Henry Dobbs, High Commissioner to the Kingdom of Iraq until 1929. (Note: Sir Henry Robert Conway Dobbs GBE KCSI KCMG KCIE FRGS (1871–1934)) He received a roving commission to be Plenipotentiary in the negotiations with Turkey over the border with northern Iraq. There was a great deal of animosity. The Turks resented British censoriousness over the alleged Armenian massacres of 1919, and the fate of the Kurds in Eastern Anatolia. Cox though was in contact with Halil Beg Bedir Khan and members of the Society for the Rise of Kurdistan and argued the Kurdish demands should be considered as well. The following year he was the Plenipotentiary at the Geneva Conference. He worked with Lloyd George in May 1925 framing the legal parameters for illegal arms shipments known as the Convention for Control of Arms Traffic. Oxford university awarded an Honorary Doctorate of Civil Laws in 1925, and then four years later Manchester university granted an Honorary Doctorate of Law.

== Relationship with Gertrude Bell ==
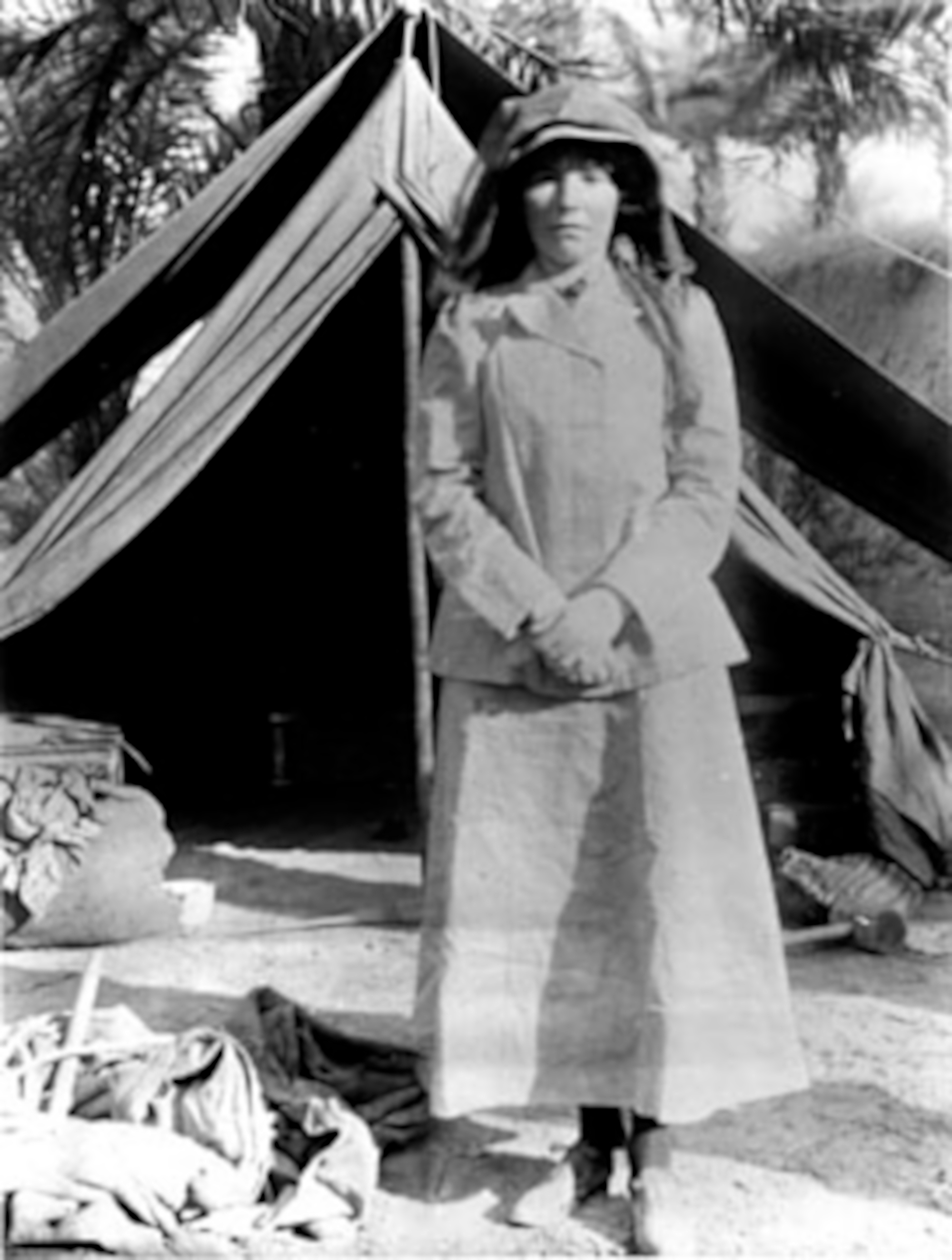
Gertrude Bell

Throughout his career in Iraq, Cox was in close connection with his aforementioned colleague Gertrude Bell. Their relationship seems unambiguously to be one of mutual admiration and respect. In her writing, Bell describes Cox as possessing an "air of fine and simple dignity," praising his "kindness and consideration," and claiming that his disposition towards her amounted to "an absurd indulgence." Bell describes Cox's political and diplomatic prowess, calling him "a master hand at the game of politics." She notes the respect that he enjoyed with the peoples of Iraq and when writing about Cox's dealings with Ibn Saud even declares, "It's really amazing that anyone should exercise influence such as his...I don't think that any European in history has made a deeper impression on the Oriental mind." Cox, for his part, returns the high regard, referring to Bell's "indefatigable assistance". He continued...to the greater degree to which Gertrude enjoyed my confidence and I her devoted co-operation, a co-operation which I know from my successor she rendered with the same singleness of purpose for him – Sir Henry Dobbs that is.

== Marriage and children ==
Lady Cox (Louisa Belle Cox, née Hamilton) was appointed Dame Commander of the Order of the British Empire (DBE) in the 1923 Birthday Honours for services in Iraq.

The couple's only son, Derek Percy Cox, was killed in action in 1917 aged twenty one, and their only daughter died at birth. Their only grandchild was Derek's son, Derek Percy Zachariah Cox (1918–1942), of the Royal Navy, formerly a flight lieutenant.

== Retirement and death ==
After Cox's departure from Baghdad, he was never again employed in any official position by the British government, but served as a delegate to several conferences. Cox devoted much of the rest of his life to the Royal Geographical Society, serving as its president from 1933 to 1936.

Sir Percy Cox died suddenly while out hunting at Melchbourne, Bedfordshire, in 1937. He apparently felt ill and dismounted, collapsing on the road beside his horse; by the time he was found by another huntsman, Lord Luke, he was already dead. The coroner recorded a verdict of heart failure.

== See also ==
- Iraqi revolt against the British
- British Mandate of Mesopotamia
- Faisal I of Iraq
- Anglo-Iraqi Treaty

== Bibliography ==
=== Manuscripts ===
- Sir Percy Z Cox Papers, Middle East Centre, St Antony's College, Oxford
- WO158: Military HQ, correspondence and papers, World War I, TNA.
- BL OLOC, – IOR N/1/210, p. 177
- RGS, travel journals in Somaliland (1894, 1898–99) and Persian Gulf
- BL, correspondence with Sir Arnold L Wilson Add MS 52455
- CUL, correspondence with Lord Hardinge of Penshurst, MEC, St Antony's College, Oxford
- CUL, correspondence with St John Philby, MEC, St Antony's College, Oxford
- CGPLA, England & Wales

=== Glossary ===
- BL – British Library, St Pancras, London
- BL Add MS – Additional Manuscript collection of the British Library
- CGPLA – Court of Grant of Probate Law and Administration
- CUL – Catalogue for University Library
- MEC – Middle Eastern Centre
- OLOC – Organization for Library Order Catalogues
- RGS – Royal Geographical Society
- TNA – The National Archives, Kew, London
- WO – (British) War Office
