= Arthur Button =

Arthur Button may refer to:

- Arthur Button (RAF officer) (1916–1991)
- Arthur Button (cricketer) (1815–1870), English cricketer
