= Croxton, Norfolk =

Village in Norfolk, England

Coordinates: 52.4450°N 0.7600°E

Croxton
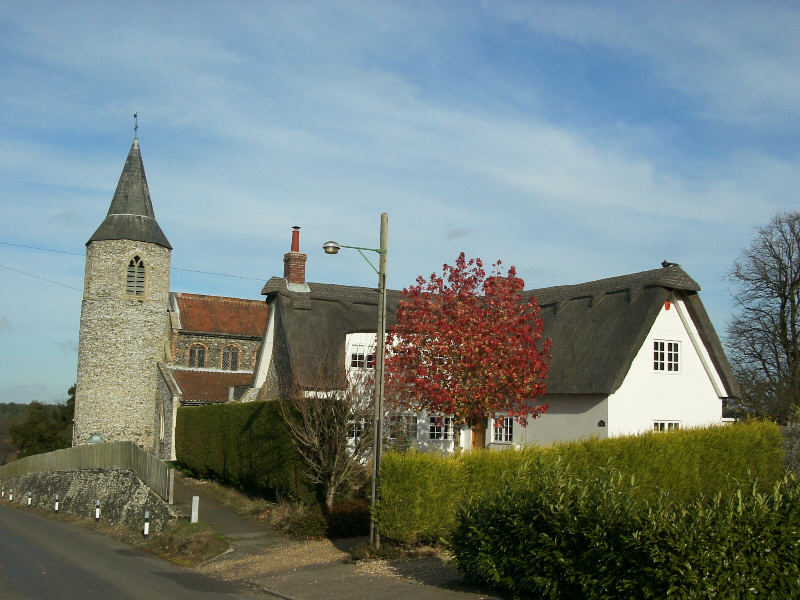
- All Saints' Church

- Location within Norfolk
- Area: 18.96 km^{2} (7.32 sq mi)
- Population: 636 (2021 census)
  - Density: 34/km^{2} (88/sq mi)
- OS grid reference: TL876865
  - London: 74 miles
- Civil parish: Croxton
- District: Breckland
- Shire county: Norfolk
- Region: East
- Country: England
- Sovereign state: United Kingdom
- Post town: THETFORD
- Postcode district: IP24
- Dialling code: 01842
- Police: Norfolk
- Fire: Norfolk
- Ambulance: East of England
- UK Parliament: South West Norfolk

Croxton is a village and civil parish in the Breckland district of Norfolk, England. It is located 2.2 miles (3.5 km) north of Thetford and 26 miles (42 km) south-east of Norwich.

== History ==
Croxton's name is of mixed Anglo-Saxon and Viking origin deriving from an amalgamation of the Old English and Old Norse for 'Krokr's' farmstead or settlement.

In the Domesday Book, Croxton is recorded as a settlement of 21 households in the hundred of Grimshoe. In 1086, the village was part of the estate of King William I.

During the Second World War, numerous pillboxes were built throughout the parish to defend against a possible German invasion.

== Geography ==
According to the 2021 census, Croxton has a population of 636 people, an increase from the 445 people recorded in the 2011 census.

The A11, between London and Norwich, and the A1075, between Thetford and Dereham, both run through the parish.

== All Saints' Church ==
The parish church of All Saints dates from the 12th century and is one of Norfolk's 124 remaining round-tower churches. It is located on The Street and has been Grade I listed since 1958.

All Saints' was extensively re-modelled and restored in the 19th century and includes a notable carved 15th century font.

== Governance ==
Croxton is part of the electoral ward of Forest for local elections and is part of the district of Breckland.

The village's national constituency is South West Norfolk which has been represented by Labour's Terry Jermy MP since 2024.

== War Memorial ==
Croxton War Memorial is an elaborate wooden screen with an accompanying mural. The memorial lists the following names for the First World War:

Rank	Name	Unit	Date of death	Burial
Capt.	Duncan C. Graham	7th Bn., Norfolk Regiment	28 Apr. 1917	Arras Memorial
2Lt.	Richard G. T. Meade	Machine Gun Corps	10 Oct. 1917	North Gate Cemetery
Cpl.	Harry J. Williams	12th Royal Lancers	15 Apr. 1917	Duisans Cemetery
LCpl.	Douglas G. Bell	10th Bn., Yorkshire Regiment	4 Oct. 1917	Tyne Cot
Pte.	Alfred C. Vincent	3rd Bn., Coldstream Guards	15 Sep. 1916	Thiepval Memorial
Pte.	George D. Eagle	3rd Bn., Dorsetshire Regiment	3 Apr. 1916	All Saints' Churchyard
Pte.	Alfred Linge	12th Bn., East Surrey Regiment	22 Oct. 1918	Lijssenthoek Cemetery
Pte.	Alfred H. Gathergood	8th Bn., East Yorkshire Regiment	31 Mar. 1917	Duisans Cemetery
Pte.	William A. Spinks	13th Bn., Royal Fusiliers	11 May 1917	Nunhead Cemetery
Pte.	Isaac W. Moule	1st Bn., Grenadier Guards	13 Mar. 1915	Arras Road Cemetery
Pte.	William H. Cant	1st Bn., Royal Munster Fusiliers	9 Sep. 1916	Thiepval Memorial
Pte.	Percy A. Meadows	1st Bn., Norfolk Regiment	7 Sep. 1916	Thiepval Memorial
Pte.	William G. Matthews	2nd Bn., Norfolk Regt.	19 Jan. 1917	North Gate Cemetery
Pte.	Alfred W. Nichols	2nd Bn., Norfolk Regt.	26 Feb. 1917	Amara War Cemetery
Pte.	George Boughen	3/1st Sqn., Norfolk Yeomanry	21 Jul. 1916	Aylesbury Cemetery
Pte.	George Vincent	7th Bn., North Staffordshire Regiment	25 Jan. 1917	Amara War Cemetery
Pte.	Bertie J. Cooper	1st Bn., Queen's West Kent Regiment	27 Sep. 1918	Gouzeaucourt Cemetery
Pte.	William H. Haines	5th Bn., Wiltshire Regiment	19 Apr. 1919	All Saints' Churchyard
