= Qushla =

Building in Baghdad, Iraq

Coordinates: 33.3412°N 44.386°E

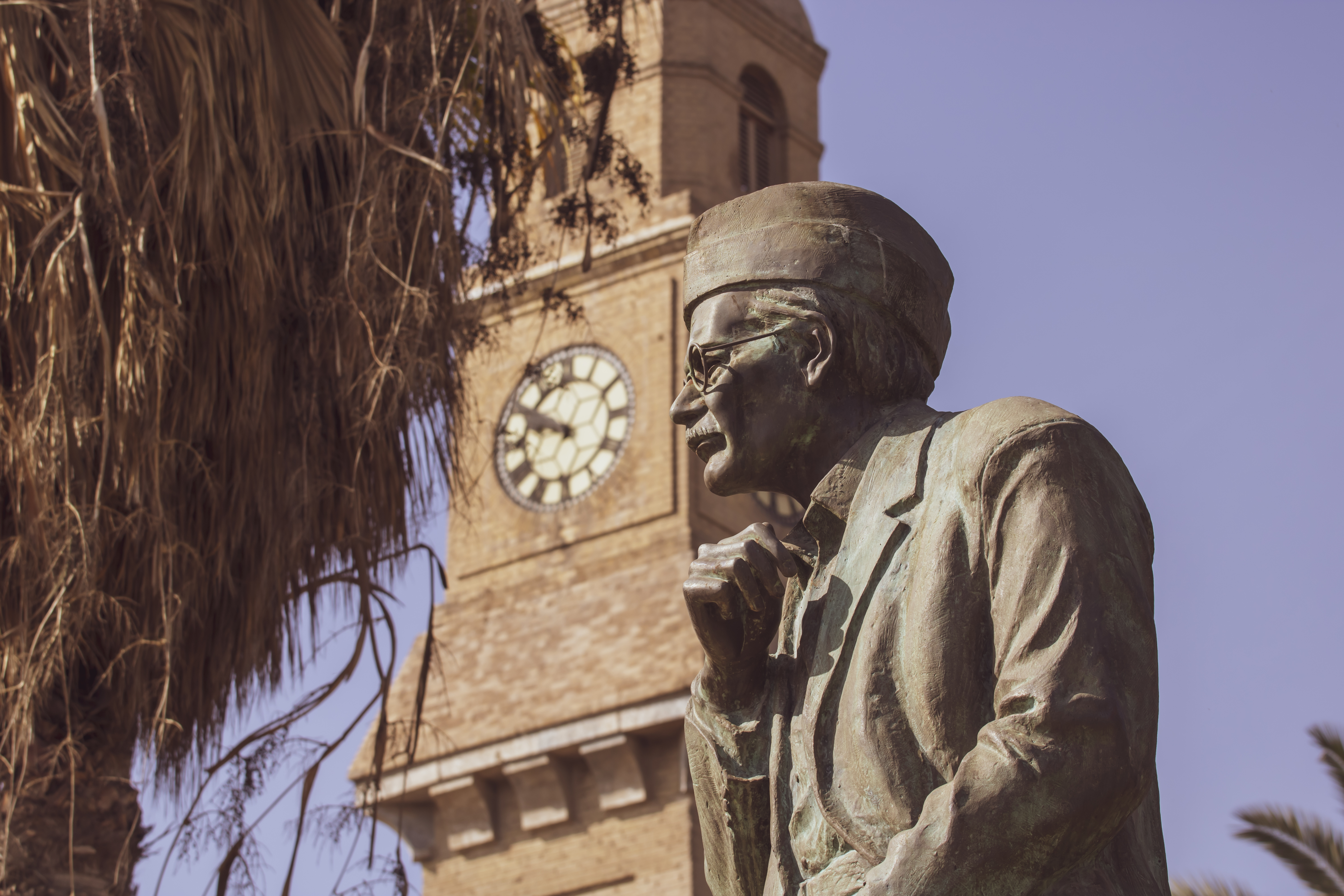
Statue and the Qushla Clock Tower

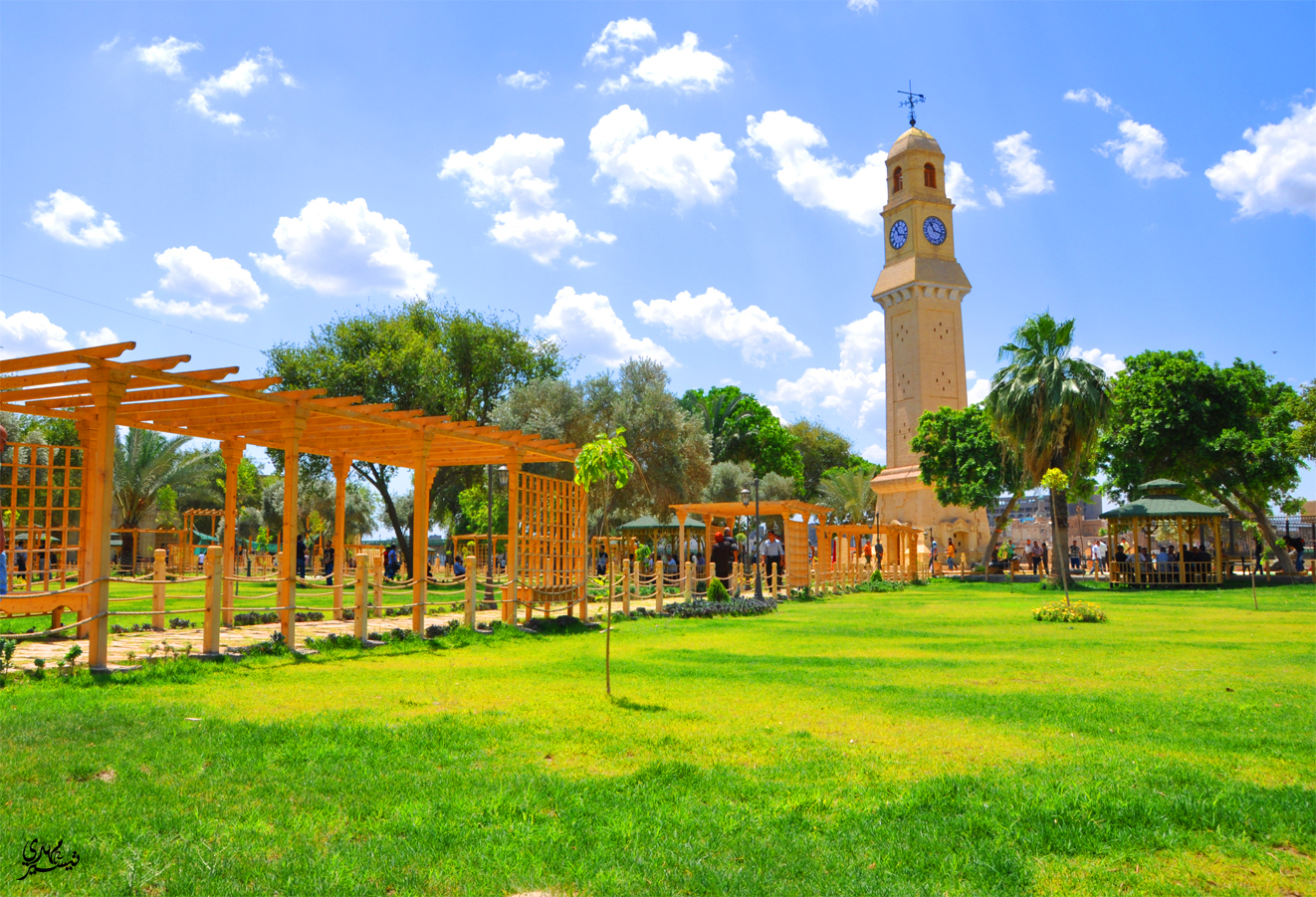
Qushla Square

The Qushla or The Qishleh (Arabic: القشلة) is an Ottoman site in Baghdad, Iraq. The Qushla lays at al-Rusafa side of the Iraqi capital. The Ottoman Wali (governor) Mehmed Namık Pasha started the building in 1881. The building was finished after him by the next Wali Midhat Pasha.

== History ==
The location of site was chosen in the center of the old central region of Baghdad on the side of al-Rusafa, an area significant for being the foundation of numerous palaces and sites that date back to the Abbasid Caliphate. The Turkish governor of Baghdad, Mehmed Namık Pasha, started building this building in 1861 and it became the seat of the state and its official departments. It included military barracks for the Ottoman army who was responsible for protecting and providing security for Baghdad at the time. Then the next Wali of Baghdad, Midhat Pasha, completed the site. At the time, the barracks housed thousands of soldiers and a clock tower was placed to wake up the soldiers and inform them of the times of military training. Currently, the Qushla is a meeting place for many visitors to al-Mutanabbi Street, and a place for cultural and social activities and art exhibitions.

== See also ==
- Ottoman architecture
- Citadel of Baghdad
