= Provisioning =

Provisioning may refer to:

- Provisioning (technology), the equipping of a telecommunications network or IT resources
- Provisioning (cruise ship), supplying a vessel for an extended voyage
  - Provisioning of USS Constitution
- Provisioning, forms of parental behavior in ethology and entomology
  - Mass provisioning, in which an adult insect stocks all the food for each of her offspring in a small chamber
  - Progressive provisioning, in which an adult feeds its larvae directly after they have hatched

== See also ==
- Provision (disambiguation)
