= Qushla Clock Tower =

Clock tower in Baghdad, Iraq

Coordinates: 33.3403°N 44.3866°E

Qushla clock tower
- ساعة القشلة
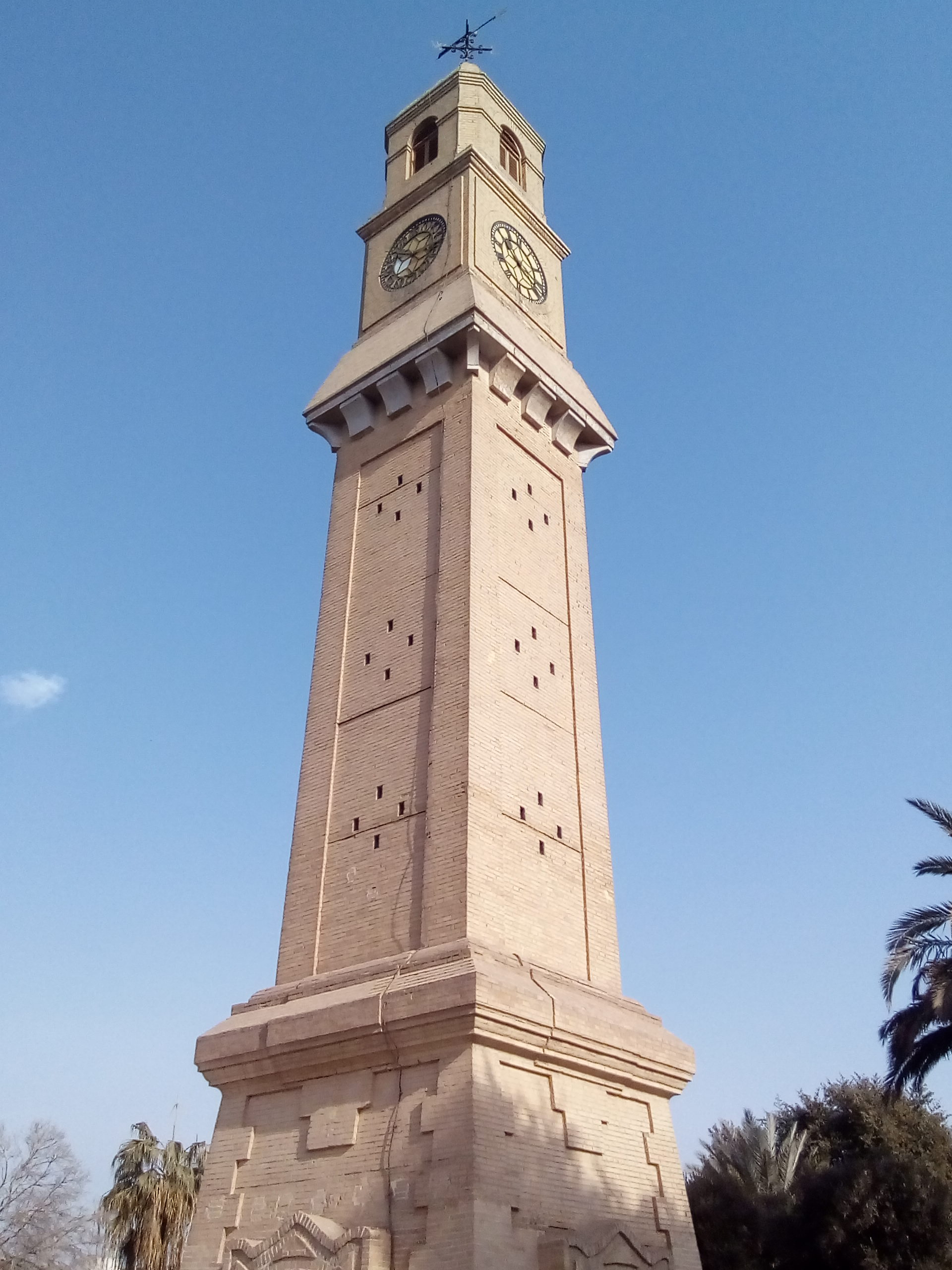

General information
- Type: Clock tower
- Location: Baghdad, Iraq
- Completed: 1871

The Qushla Clock Tower (Arabic: ساعة القشلة) is a 19th-century clock tower located in the square of the Qushla square overlooking the Tigris river in Baghdad, Iraq. Dating back to the late Ottoman Empire period, the clock tower is one of the most recognizable buildings in the Qushla and remained in operation after the independence of Iraq.

The Qushla clock tower is listed as a part of a tentative UNESCO World Heritage Site list as an example of the history and heritage of Baghdad.

== History ==
The clock tower was first laid down by Ottoman governor Mehmed Namık Pasha in 1861 when he was the viceroy of Baghdad. The construction of the clock tower was then passed to Taqi al-Din Pasha and then completed under Midhat Pasha in 1871. The clock tower is located in the Qushal, then an Ottoman military base overlooking the Tigris River. The purpose of the clock tower was to alarm military troops in the base in the morning for the time of training. The clock tower was purposely built next to the Tigris River so that the sound of its bells can reach all Baghdad. After its establishment, the clock tower became instantly recognizable among Baghdadi citizens.

After the Ottomans pulled out of Iraq in 1917 and the beginning of the British Empire's rule in Iraq during World War I, the clock tower was left neglected for three years until a British major surnamed Slater ordered the clock to be repaired and put back into operation. By that point, the clock has existed for half a century. Following the killing of Lieutenant-Colonel Gerard Leachman by a Bedouin during the 1920 Iraqi Revolt, donations were collected to build a bronze statue of the colonel to immortalize his memory in Iraq. Gertrude Bell suggested that the statue should be placed above the clock tower. The statue, depicting Leachman wearing Arab clothes while riding on a camel and holding a stick, was installed during the 6 May 1923 restoration. The statue pointed to the wind direction in the direction of the letter "N" on the clock tower, and remained there until July 1958 when it was lowered and toppled.

After King Faisal I visited the United Kingdom in the summer of 1927, King George V gifted the king a large clock made by a British company. The clock's northern and western sides had Arabic numerals while the eastern and southern sides were in Latin numerals. The clock also came with new machines to work with the new clock. This clock remains to this day in the clock tower. Next to the clock tower, there was a government palace named "Qasr al-Mashiriyya" that also overlooked the Tigris River.

=== Modern era ===
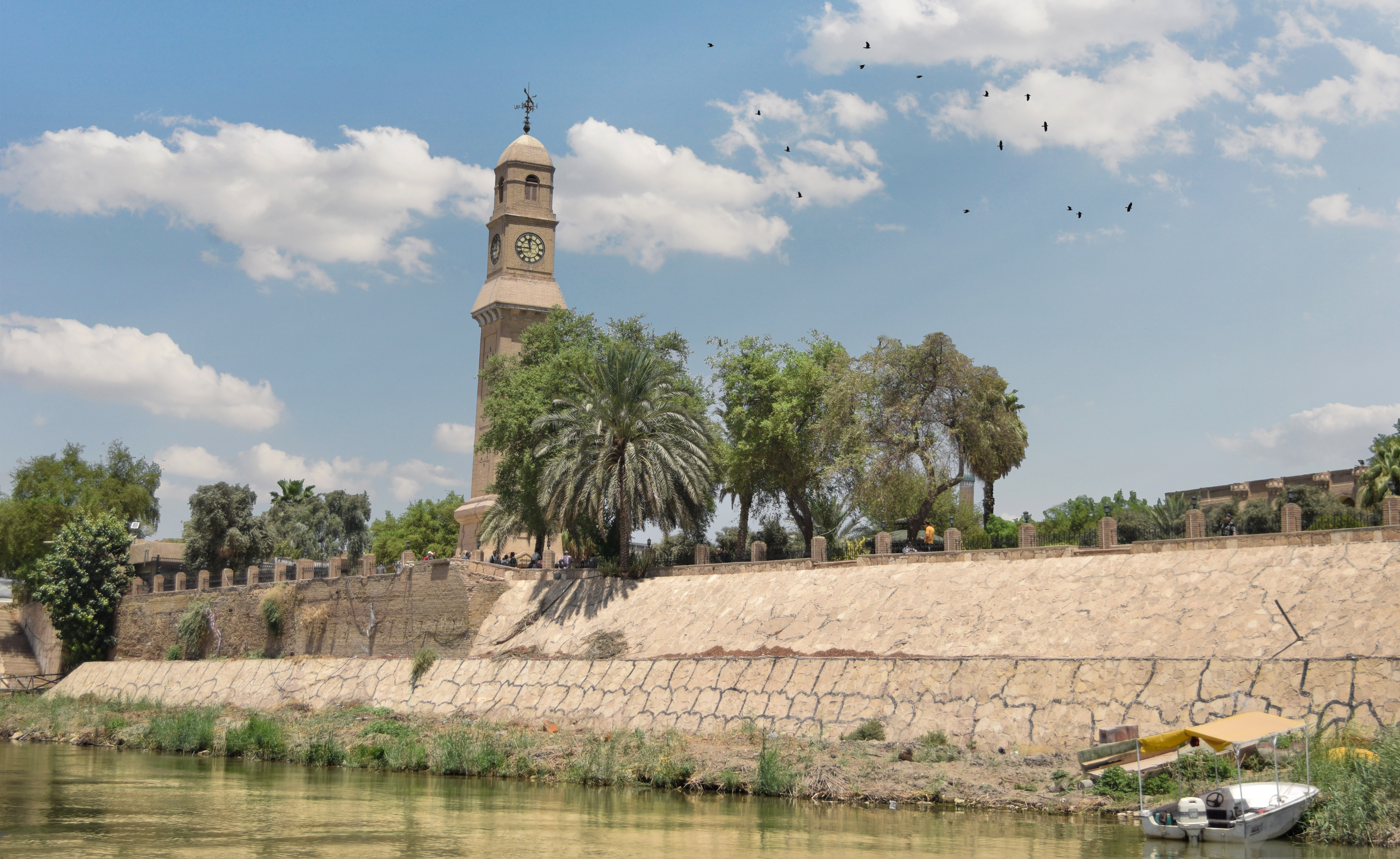
The Qushla Clock Tower as seen from the Tigris River

After the bombing of the Shabandar Coffeehouse in 2007 which is located next to the Qushla, there were widespread fears among intellectual Iraqis that the clock tower would cease operation. The clock stopped operating after the bombing and many intellectuals and researchers noted the necessity of the clock tower's operations. Iraqi academic Hamid Majeed al-Hado stated the importance of the clock tower to al-Jazeera as part of the city's landmarks and helped people in the area to identify time. According to a report by al-Jazeera in 2010, financial problems was the reason why operation of the clock was stopped.

After a long hiatus, the Qushla clock tower, along with the complex its located in, was repaired and put back into operation in 2013.

== Description ==
Overlooking a large garden lawn, the tower is thirty meters high with its foundation width being four meters each. The tower, becoming more narrow as it rises more, has a staircase that includes 73 steps to the top with windows on all sides for ventilation. Located 23 meters from the ground, the clock tower contains a square-shaped clock room with machines operating the clocks on all four sides. Those machines are operated by a manual installation by a specialist once every three days. Above the clock room is another space containing windows where the bell is located. This space is one and a half meters tall, and its diameter is one meter.

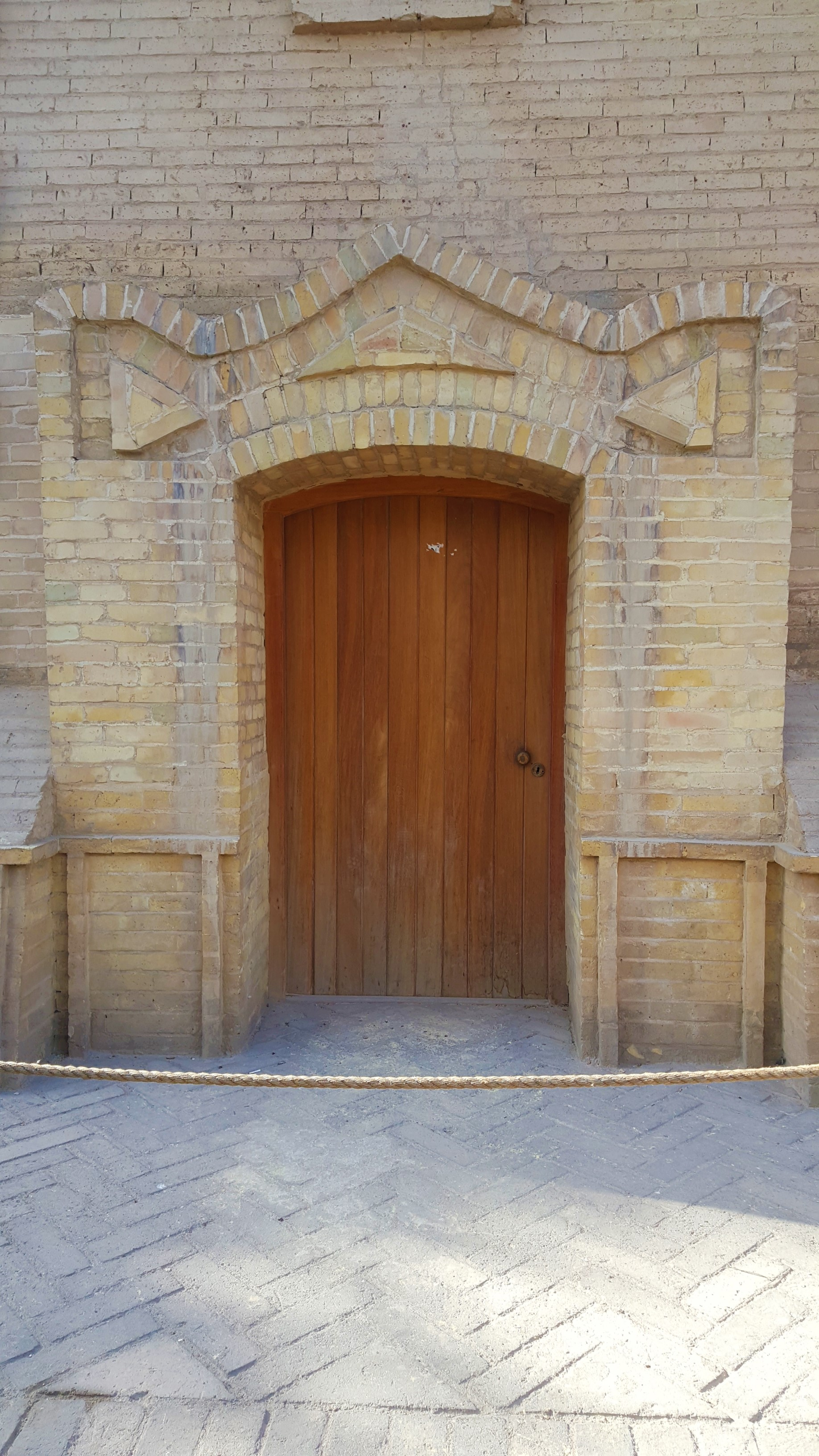
The wooden door of the clock tower

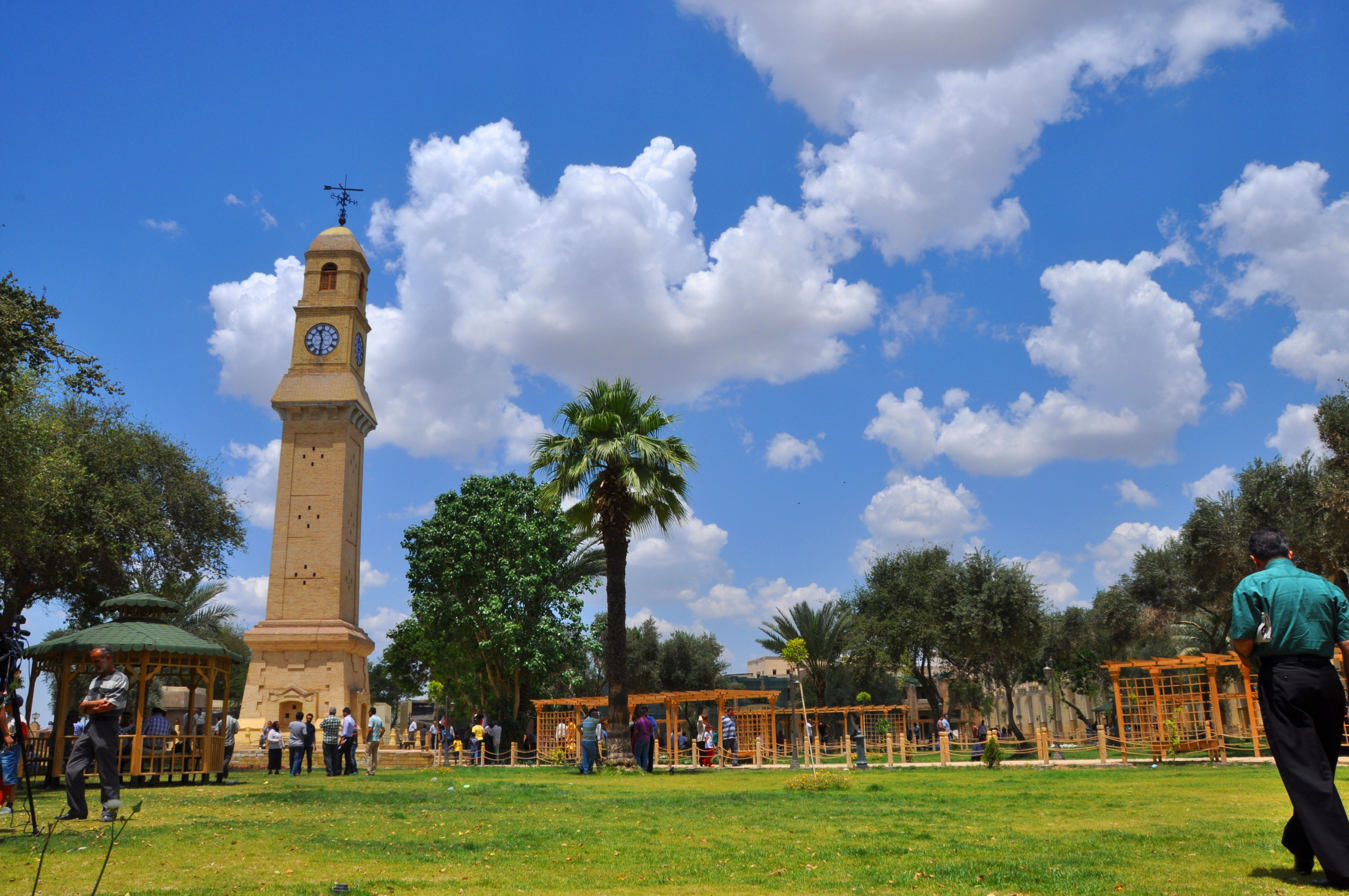
The clock tower overlooking the Qushla Complex's garden lawn

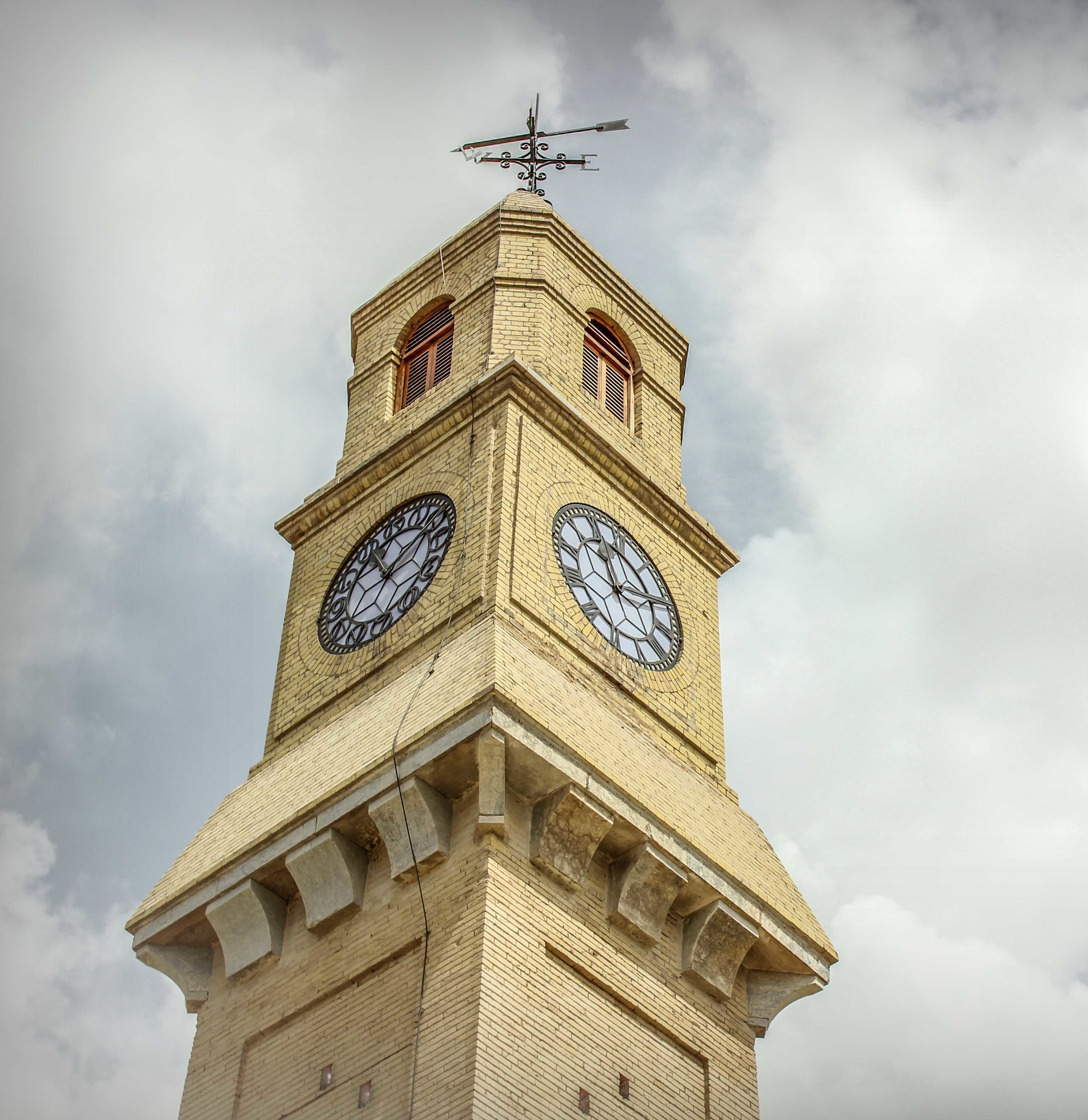
The tower's clock, note the Latin and Arabic numerals of each side

== See also ==
- Adhamiyya Clock Tower
- Baghdad Clock
- List of clock towers

== Sources ==
- Al-Bahrani, Ra'ouf (2009). Diary of Ra'ouf al-Bahrani (in Arabic). Beirut: Arab Center for Studies and Publishing. p. 71. ISBN 9789953363226. OCLC 1158755891.
- Shouqi, Abd al-Emir (2008). A Day in Baghdad (in Arabic) (1st ed.). The Arabic Foundation for Studies. ISBN 9789953362113. OCLC 1158805043.
