= Provision =

Provision(s) may refer to:

- Provision (accounting), a term for liability in accounting
- Provision (contracting), a term for a procurement condition
- Provision (album), an album by Scritti Politti
- A term for the distribution, storing and/or rationing of supplies, typically food or drink:
  - Ground provisions, root vegetables used in Caribbean cuisine

== See also ==
- Provisioning (disambiguation)
- Proviso (disambiguation)
