= Arthur Button (cricketer) =

English cricketer

- Born: 1815
- Died: 1870 (aged 54–55)
- Occupation: Cricketer

Arthur Zachariah Button, later Cox (1815–1870) was an English cricketer. Button was born in Stifford, Essex and played only one important match - for the Marylebone Cricket Club in July 1838. A batsman and bowler of unknown handedness, he scored ten while batting last in the order, then took one wicket with the ball as the MCC drew with an Oxford University cricket team.

In 1858, his relative Philip Zachariah Cox died and Button changed his last name to "Cox" to qualify for a share of the estate. Cox served as a Deputy Lieutenant of the County of Essex, a Justice of the Peace, and a Master of Fox Hounds. He was also an officer in the Essex militia.

He and his wife, Julienne Emily (née Saunders), had seven children. Their third son was Major General Sir Percy Zachariah Cox (1864–1937), an important figure in the creation of the modern Middle East.

Their second son Lt. Col. Edward Henry Cox (born 1863) also had a distinguished military career, being mentioned in dispatches and earning a Queen's South Africa Medal with five clasps, the King's South Africa Medal with two clasps, and the Distinguished Service Order during the Boer War.
