= Baghdad (North Gate) War Cemetery =

Cemetery in Baghdad, Iraq

Coordinates: 33°21′18″N 44°23′10″E

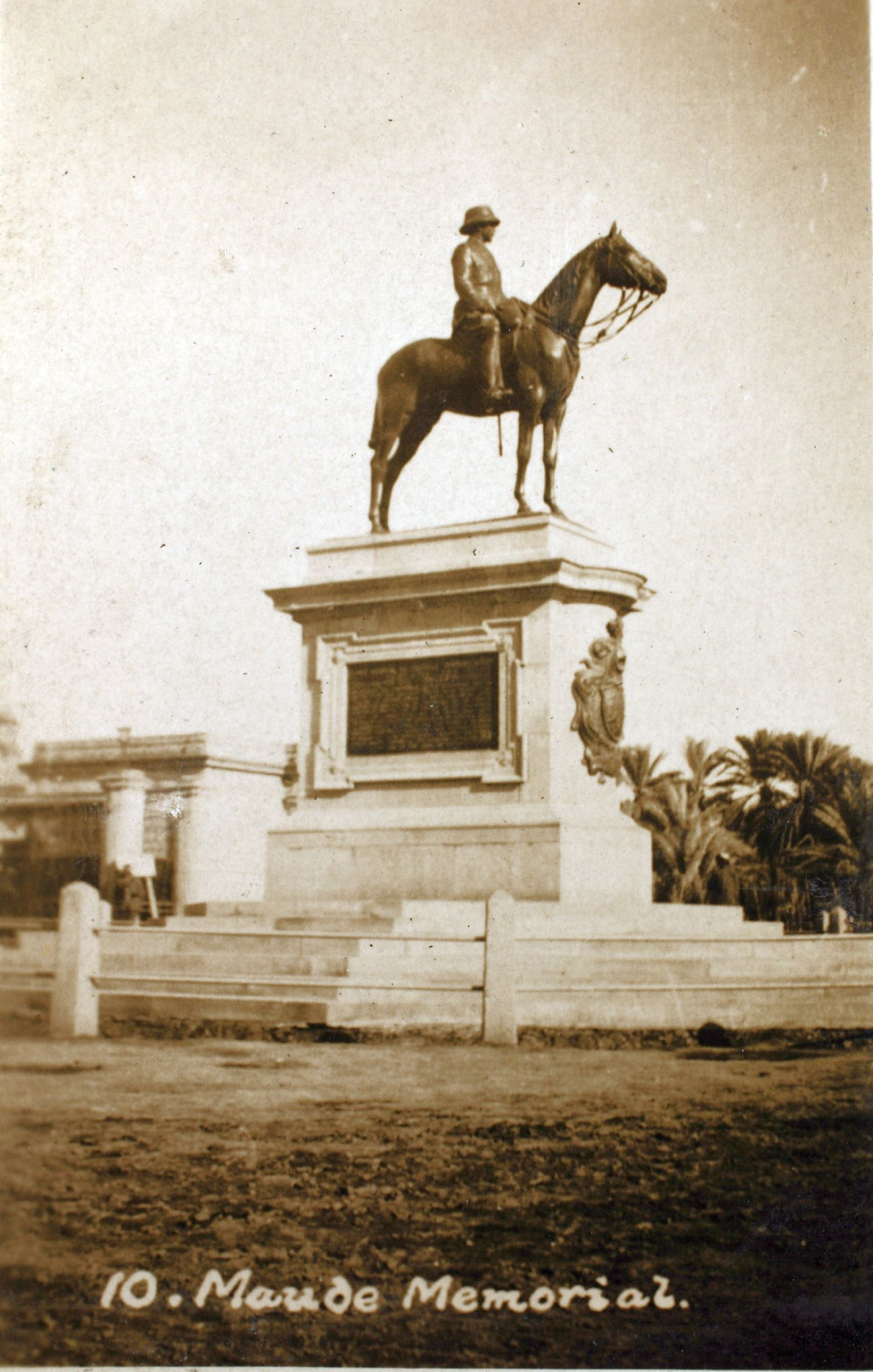
Sir Stanley Maude Memorial in Baghdad 1923

The Baghdad (North Gate) War Cemetery is a cemetery in Baghdad in Iraq. The cemetery contains 4480 interments and commemorations. Many graves are marked by Commonwealth War Graves Commission (CWGC) gravestones. The CWGC graves in the cemetery commemorate military personnel killed in the country in World War I and World War II. In 2012 511 CWGC headstones were repaired with new concrete bases and a new boundary fence was completed.

In addition to the commonwealth burials and commemorations, 127 war graves of nationalities from the First and Second World Wars are located in the cemetery, including 100 Turkish burials and 41 non-war graves.

The cemetery is located in Waziriah, an area of Baghdad's Al-Russafa district. The main entrance to the North Gate War Cemetery is opposite the College of Arts and the Institute of Administration in Baghdad University.

A two volume Roll of Honour marking the burials and commemorations of commonwealth forces in Iraqi cemeteries has been produced and is available to view at the Commonwealth War Graves Commission's headquarters in Maidenhead in Berkshire, England.

The cemetery has been tended and guarded by three generations of the Feri family.

A 2002 article by Ian Cobain in The Times detailed recent vandalism against British and commonwealth cemeteries in Iraq. In the North Gate cemetery headstones had been removed from graves and Maude's mausoleum was covered in graffiti.

A 2020 article in The Times reported that the cemetery is neglected with many of the graves covered in thick mud. The cemetery is also littered with rubbish dumped by passers by.

== Notable interments ==
- Lieutenant General Sir Frederick Stanley Maude. His initial grave and marker was replaced by a more elaborate structure and then enclosed in a small mausoleum structure on the walls of which is mounted the standard CWGC headstone. The epitaph on his CWGC gravestone reads: "'I am the resurrection and the life'. He fought a good fight. He kept the faith."
- Lieutenant-Colonel Gerard Leachman (1880 – 1920), soldier and intelligence officer.
