= Proviso =

Proviso means a conditional provision to an agreement. It may refer to

- Proviso Township, Cook County, Illinois, United States
  - Proviso Township High Schools District 209 that comprises
    - Proviso East High School
    - Proviso West High School
    - Proviso Mathematics and Science Academy
- Wilmot Proviso, an American law to ban slavery in annexed territory from Mexico proposed by David Wilmot in the 1840s
- Lockean proviso, a feature of John Locke's labour theory of property
