= Gerard Leachman =

British intelligence officer (1880–1920)

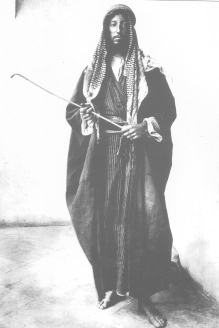
Colonel Leachman dressed as a Bedouin

Lieutenant-Colonel Gerard Evelyn Leachman, CIE, DSO (27 July 1880, Petersfield, Hampshire – 12 August 1920, Iraq) was an English soldier and intelligence officer who travelled extensively in Arabia.

== Career ==
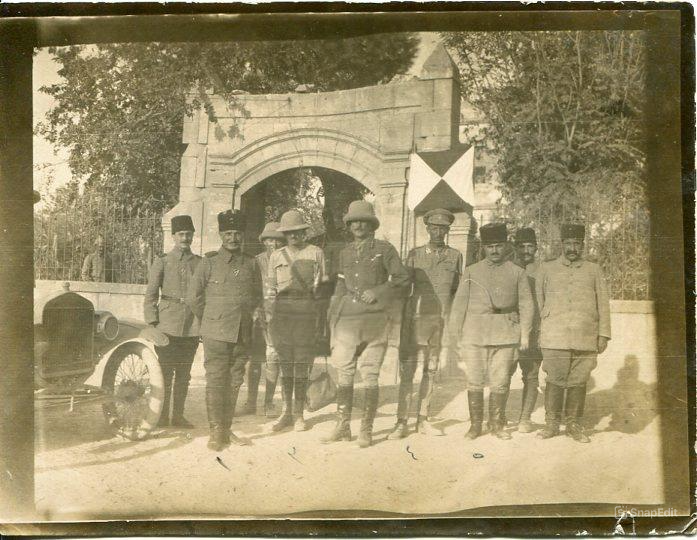
A photo which includes Ali İhsan Sâbis, Alexander Cobbe, General Robert Cassels, Leachman and other military personnel in front of Mosul Military Headquarters, 2 November 1918

Leachman was commissioned a second lieutenant in the Royal Sussex Regiment on 20 January 1900, and the following month left with his battalion for service in South Africa during the Second Boer War. He served there until the end of the war, in June 1902, and left Cape Town in the SS Bavarian in August, returning to Southampton the following month, and was promoted to lieutenant on 17 December 1902. He later served in India, but spent most of his career as a political officer in Mesopotamia, where he was instrumental in pacifying warring tribes to bring stability to the new country. Leachman also made various expeditions further south into Arabia, where he contacted Ibn Sa'ud on behalf of the British government. He travelled as a naturalist of the Royal Geographical Society, but was in fact a British agent.

With his dark, Semitic looks and skill at riding a camel, Leachman was easily able to pass as Bedouin and often travelled incognito.

Leachman's first major expedition south into the Arabian Peninsula was in 1909, during which he was involved in a ferocious battle between the Anaiza and Shammar tribes near Ha'il. He was awarded the MacGregor Medal of the United Service Institution of India for reconnaissance in 1910. In 1912 Leachman made a second expedition with the intention of crossing the Rub Al Khali, but was refused permission by Ibn Sa'ud when he reached Riyadh and instead went to Hasa. He was the first Briton to be received by Ibn Sa'ud in his home city.

In December 1915, during the Siege of Kut, the British commanding officer, Major General Charles Townshend, ordered Leachman to save the British cavalry by breaking out and riding south. This he did and the cavalry were the only British unit to escape before the fall of the city to the Ottomans.

Leachman was close to Gertrude Bell's friend Fahad Bey Ibn Haddal, chief of the Amarat Bedouins and fought with the Muntafiq Bedouin federation. The Bedouin called him Njayman.

Prior to the conclusion of the war, Leachman was assigned to the 17th Indian Division, which was assigned the task of operating on both the left and right banks of the Tigris in an effort to advance north in order to secure as much territory from the Ottomans prior to the now inevitable surrender of the Ottoman Empire. Leachman was specifically assigned to Light Armoured Motor Brigade on the right bank of the Tigris, ostensibly with a special task to work with local tribes.

== Death ==
After the war, he was assigned as Political Officer for the Mosul Division within Mesopotamia, until October 1919. He was murdered during the 1920 Iraqi Revolt by a son of Sheikh Dhari ibn Mahmoud, an Arab tribal leader of the Zoba tribe in the Shammar confederation, in Abu Ghraib near Fallujah on 12 August 1920. The episode is famous in Bedouin oral lore. Leachman had visited Dhari in an effort to renegotiate repayment of advances made to him by the government and to persuade him to remain loyal to the current administration, but was shot in the back by Dhari's son and then beheaded after a verbal disagreement over a local robbery. Leachman's murder sparked an immediate outbreak of tribal uprisings on the Euphrates between Fallujah and Hit, and was responsible for General Haldane's advance on the same area in September 1920. He was buried in Baghdad (North Gate) War Cemetery.

== Legacy ==
Donations were collected to build a bronze statue of Leachman to immortalise his memory in Iraq. Gertrude Bell suggested that the statue should be placed on the Qushla Clock Tower in Baghdad. The statue, depicting Leachman wearing Arab clothes while riding on a camel and holding a stick, was installed during the 6 May 1923 restoration. The statue remained there until July 1958 when it was lowered and toppled.

He was played by Oliver Reed in Clash of Loyalties (also known as Al-Mas' Ala Al-Kubra), a 1983 film financed by Saddam Hussein, which was nominated for the Golden Prize at the 1983 Moscow International Film Festival.
