= Ottoman Iraq =

1534–1920 Ottoman rule of Iraq

Ottoman Iraq خطهٔ عراقیه (Ottoman Turkish) Hıtta-i Irakiyye
- Region of the Ottoman Empire
- 1534–1920
- Flag

- Ottoman Iraq within the empire, c. 1900
- Capital: Baghdad
- Population
  - 1875: 2,000,000
- Historical era: Early modern period
  - Ottoman Conquest: 1534
  - Safavid War: 1623–1639
  - Nader Shah's War: 1732–1733
  - Mamluk Period: 1749–1831
  - British Mandate: 1920
Preceded by	Succeeded by
Safavid Baghdad	Mandatory Iraq

Ottoman Iraq (Ottoman Turkish: خطهٔ عراقیه, romanized: Hıṭṭa-i ʿIrāqiyye, lit. the Iraq region) was the Ottoman name for the region of Iraq that was under their control. Historians often divide its history into five main periods. The first began with Sultan Süleyman I's conquest in 1534 and ended with the Safavid capture of Baghdad in 1623. The second lasted from the Ottoman reconquest in 1638 to the start of Mamluk self-rule in 1749. The third period, from 1749 to 1831, was marked by the Georgian Mamluk dynasty's semi-autonomous governance. The fourth stretched from the Ottoman removal of the Mamluks in 1831 to 1869, when reformist governor Midhat Pasha took office. The fifth and final phase ran from 1869 until 1917, when British forces occupied Baghdad during the First World War.

Administratively, during the first period in the 16th century, Baghdad Eyalet encompassed much of the territory of modern Iraq. In the 17th century, the Ottomans had reorganized Iraq into four eyalets (Baghdad, Basra, Mosul, and Shahrizor). However, from the late 17th century, a trend of administrative unification began, with Basra coming under Baghdad's control from around 1705 and Mosul and Shahrizor following after 1780 during the semi-autonomous Mamluk period. Following this unification, Mamluk rulers such as Sulayman the Great were described as governing "all of Iraq", and the Ottomans themselves began referring to the region unofficially as "the land of Iraq". By 1830, and possibly earlier, these were being collectively referred to in official Ottoman correspondence as the region of Iraq, as attested in a letter from Sultan Mahmud II. The four eyalets were later consolidated in the 19th century into the vilayets of Mosul, Baghdad, and Basra, which were treated as a single "Iraq Region" (Hıtta-i Irakiyye).

For much of the early modern period, Iraq was a contested frontier in the Ottoman–Persian wars, with control over Baghdad frequently shifting between the two empires. During World War I, Iraq became the focus of fighting between the British Empire and the Ottoman Empire in the Mesopotamian campaign, culminating in the British occupation of Baghdad in 1917 and the establishment of the British Mandate of Mesopotamia in 1920.

== Terminology and geography ==
In the 16th century, the Baghdad Eyalet encompassed districts such as İmadiye and Zâho in the north, Ane and Deyrü Rahbe in the west, Kerne in the south, and Kasr-ı Şirin in the east, according to imperial registers from 1558–1587. This is an administrative configuration that closely resembles the borders of modern Iraq. During the Mamluk period, the Ottomans unofficially referred to the territory of the Mamluks, from Basra to Shahrizor, as the "land of Iraq". From at least the early-19th century onward, official correspondence referred to these provinces collectively as the Iraq Region (Hıtta-i Irakiyye). Baghdad was described in Ottoman administrative discourse as the capital of the Iraq Region (kürsî-i Hıtta-i Irakiyye), overseeing the provinces of Baghdad, Basra, Mosul, and Shahrizor. In an 1879 telegram, Mosul governor Feyzi Pasha appealed for tax relief by emphasizing Mosul's inclusion in the Iraq Region. Iraq was used to describe the unified administrative space encompassing the three vilayets.

The Safavids claimed that Arab Iraq had always belonged to the kings of Iran, presenting it not as a conquered frontier but as a hereditary component of Iranian sovereignty unjustly seized by the Ottomans. Basra province, in Lower Mesopotamia, was sometimes considered outside Arab Iraq, lying on its border. Safavid sources referred to the Ottoman governor of Baghdad as the ruler of Arab Iraq. Safavid-controlled Arab Iraq has been described as consisting of the provinces of Baghdad and Diyarbakr. Safavid sources also treated control of the four shrine cities, also known as Al-Atabat Al-Aliyat, as the heart of Arab Iraq, and defined it that way, regardless of Ottoman administrative divisions. The later Afsharid period saw Nader Shah's campaign in Iraq. His financial officer, Mohammad Kazem Marvi, recorded in 'Alam-ara-ye Nadiri the capture of spoils from "Kirkuk, Suleimaniyah, and others in the land of Arab Iraq".

In the 19th century, the Qajars continued the narrative portraying Iraq's shrine cities as the heart of Iranian sovereignty. During this period, they adopted European colonial methods, drawing on works such as Pinnock's classification of regions, cartography, travelogues, and court photography to strengthen their claims over Iraq. Qajar shahs adopted the title "Shah of the Two Iraqs". Court works such as Mirʾāt al-Buldān and Jam-i Jam, along with Nasir al-Din Shah's travelogue and court photography, incorporated ancient sites such as the Taq Kasra at Ctesiphon and Babylon. These were used in an attempt to create an unbroken Iranian kingship stretching from the Achaemenids and Sasanians to the Qajars as a basis for their claim over Iraq. Unlike the Ottomans, who drew no distinction between Jazira and Arab Iraq, Qajar sources generally excluded Jazira, focusing their claims on southern Iraq rather than the lands north of Samarra.

== History ==
=== 1534–1623: First Ottoman period ===
==== Conquest of Iraq ====
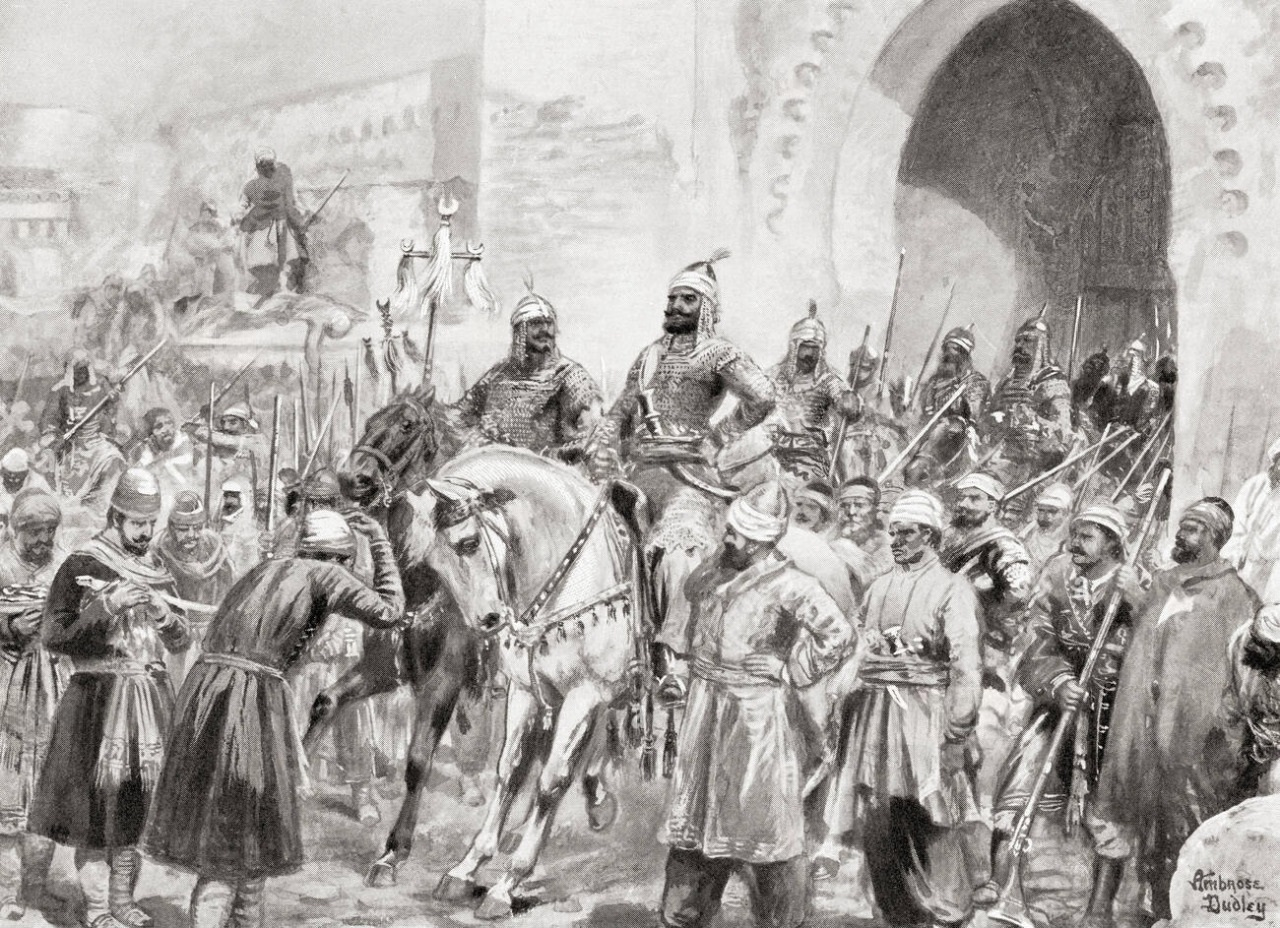
Sultan Suleiman the Magnificent enters Baghdad (1534).

Before Sultan Süleyman I personally entered Iraq, the foundation of the conquest was laid by Grand Vizier İbrahim Pasha, who departed from Istanbul in late 1533 and spent the winter in Aleppo preparing the advance. From this staging ground, İbrahim Pasha oversaw military logistics and gathered extensive intelligence from the eastern frontier. Among the most valuable correspondents was Süleyman Paşa, a former governor (Beylerbeyi) of Diyarbekir and then of Anatolia, who reported that Shah Tahmasb I of the Safavid Empire was likely wintering in Kum, deterred from movement by the threat of an Uzbek offensive under Ubeyd Han advancing from Merv. Ottoman intelligence indicated that the Turkoman Tekelü Mehmed Han, an Qizilbash commander recently appointed as governor of Baghdad, had stocked the city with several years' worth of supplies but maintained only limited local support. According to information gathered by Seyyid Ahmed Bey, the Bey of Mosul, a local Arab notable of northern Iraq, and Hüseyin Büşra, another Arab ally of the Ottomans, Tekelü Mehmed had alienated surrounding tribal elements and was unlikely to submit peacefully.

Building on this intelligence, İbrahim Pasha advanced steadily into northern Iraq and eastern Anatolia, where he cultivated alliances across a mosaic of local powers: Kurdish, Arab, and Turcoman. In many of these regions, populated by a mix of these groups, Ottoman troops were seen as liberators from Safavid Shi‘i control. Meanwhile, tribes loyal to the Ottomans, like that of Hüseyin Büşra, operating in the Kirkuk–Wasit corridor, actively supported the campaign through intelligence gathering and armed patrols. As areas fell under control, İbrahim Pasha quickly instituted Ottoman administrative rule, appointing local allies and trusted commanders as sancakbeyis, complete with fiscal salaries (measured in akçes), while restoring Sunni religious practice, including the public khutba in Süleyman's name. By the time Sultan Süleyman joined the army in the summer of 1534, İbrahim Pasha had already weakened the Safavid position in Iraq, setting the stage for the Ottoman entry into Baghdad later that year.

The broader campaign, known as the Campaign of the Two Iraqs (Irakeyn Seferi), referring to Arab Iraq and Persian Iraq, was part of a long-term Ottoman frontier policy toward Persia, initiated in the aftermath of the Battle of Chaldiran (1514). Following the advance into Kirkuk, where the army remained for 28 days, and the capture of Baghdad in 1534, the Ottomans established full control over Mosul, organizing it into an eyalet with six sanjaks, marking the beginning of sustained Ottoman rule over Iraq.

==== Administrative consolidation under Baghdad ====
Following the Ottoman conquest of Iraq in 1534, the empire established the Baghdad Eyalet as a key frontier province. By the late-16th century, the eyalet encompassed numerous sancaks spanning from northern to southern Iraq, including cities such as Amediyye, Altunköprü, Ane, Deyrü Rahbe, Erbil, Hillah, Kasr-ı Şirin, Kerne, Kirkuk, Mosul, Samawa, Tikrit, Wâsıt, and Zaho. This administrative structure reflects the early Ottoman effort to govern Iraq as a strategically unified zone within the empire's eastern frontier.

In the decades following the conquest, Ottoman authority in Iraq’s major cities rested on both military garrisons and religious institutions. Imperial and provincial elites established religious endowments (waqfs), while the state supervised the appointment of clerics such as imams and teachers. Historian Faisal Husain argues that this alliance of throne and altar echoed a pattern that had underpinned most political projects in Iraq since the era of the Sumerian city-states.

=== 1623–1749: Safavid interlude and reconquest ===
==== Iraq under Safavid occupation ====
Early 17th-century Safavid sources reflect that Baghdad, Erbil, Kirkuk, and Mosul were treated as parts of an integrated military-administrative zone, consistently approached as a unified strategic zone within the region referred to as Iraq. Following the Safavid conquest of Baghdad in 1623, under Shah Abbas I, command was quickly extended northward. Qārcaqāy Khān was dispatched to secure Mosul, while Khan Ahmad Ardalān was sent to Kirkuk and Shahrizor, where Ottoman garrisons retreated or fled in disarray following the loss of Baghdad. Administrative appointments further reinforced the Safavid treatment of Baghdad, Mosul, Kirkuk, and Shahrizor as a single, integrated military-administrative zone: Zeynal Beg, tasked with defending Baghdad, was also ordered to operate in the Mosul frontier. Similarly, Qāsem Khan, appointed as governor of the Mosul province, fortified the city and directed local military efforts as part of the broader defense of Iraq. In later passages, Ottoman troop movements and local tribal responses across Mosul, Kirkuk, and Baghdad are described as interconnected, suggesting a cohesive operational and administrative Iraq within Safavid strategic planning.

==== Ottoman reconquest of Iraq (1639) ====
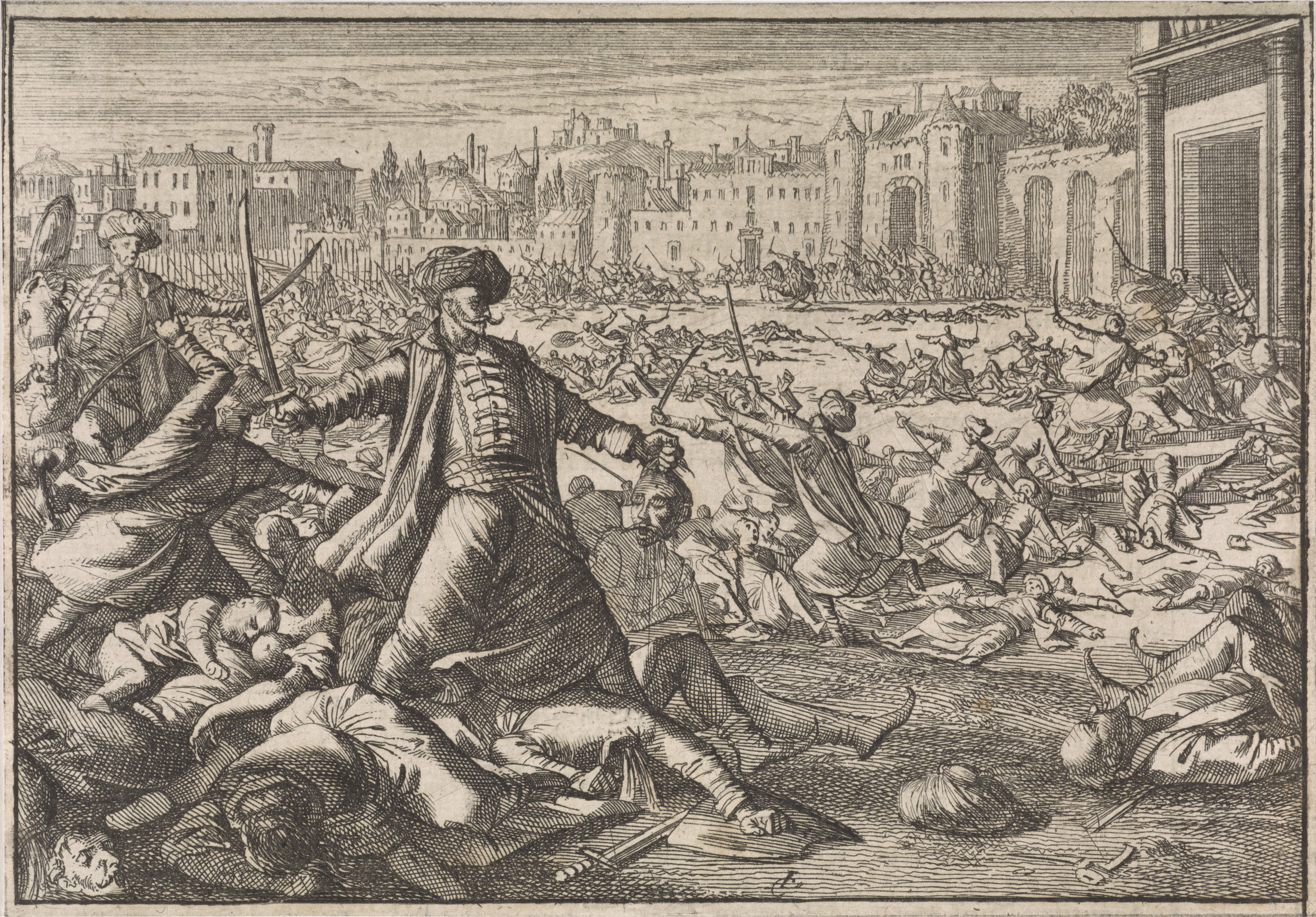
Ottoman Conquest of Baghdad (1638) by Caspar Luyken.

Ottoman-Safavid rivalry over Iraq continued for much of the 16th and early 17th centuries. The Peace of Amasya (1555) marked the first formal territorial division between the two empires, and the issue was conclusively resolved with the Treaty of Zuhab in 1639. The treaty confirmed Ottoman sovereignty over Baghdad, Basra, and Mosul, solidifying control over the region. The agreement affirmed Ottoman authority over Iraq.

==== Nader Shah's Iraqi campaign (1732–1733) ====
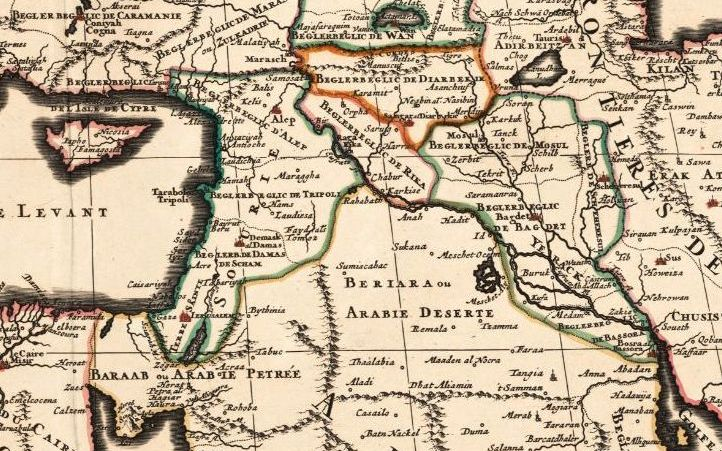
A 1696 map of Ottoman Iraq, showing the region as perceived by the French cartographer Jaillot.

In 1733, during renewed conflict between the Ottoman Empire and the Persian ruler Nadir Shah, Persian forces crossed the Iraqi frontier (Irak sınırını aşarak) and launched an assault on Erbil and Kirkuk. Ottoman sources describe the event as a major military incursion into imperial territory. In response, Topal Osman Pasha, the imperial commander (serasker), led an army of 170,000 troops and defeated the Persian forces near Baghdad. Following this initial victory, however, Baghdad's governor, Ahmed Pasha, withdrew, citing a lack of provisions, enabling a surprise counterattack by Nadir Shah. Topal Osman Pasha was killed in the ensuing battle near Kirkuk. The city capitulated under terms that guaranteed the safety of its inhabitants. The defense of Mosul was led by its governor, Hüseyin Pasha, who rallied the population, repaired fortifications, and successfully repelled a six-day siege. In subsequent campaigns, Hasan Pasha, governor of Mosul and imperial serasker, mobilized tribal allies and repelled further Iranian advances.

=== 1749–1831: Mamluk period ===
The Mamluk period saw Georgian-origin Mamluks ruling Baghdad with considerable autonomy from Istanbul, while maintaining nominal loyalty to the Ottoman sultan. This era was marked by fiscal reform, military reorganization, and political stability, but ended with the Ottoman reconquest under Ali Rıza Pasha in 1831.

=== 1831–1869: Early Ottoman reassertion ===
==== Ali Rıza Pasha's centralization of Iraq (1831-1834) ====
In a letter issued in 1830 during the final year of Mamluk rule, Sultan Mahmud II addressed the administrative situation in Iraq and the conduct of Davud Pasha, the governor of Baghdad. He wrote:

"I know Davud Pasha is the vali of Baghdad, but over time he has changed his position and his blindness has surpassed his righteousness... The forms of injustice and hostility imposed on the people of the Hıtta of Iraq increase day by day... In order to achieve our will, we have added the Baghdad, Basra and Shahrizor eyalets to one ministerial unit."

Following the dismissal of the last Mamluk governor, Davud Pasha, in 1831, Baghdad was brought under direct Ottoman rule, marking a pivotal shift in the administrative organization of Iraq. Appointed as governor by the Sublime Porte, Ali Rıza Pasha not only assumed control over Baghdad but also began to act as a regional administrator, asserting authority over the neighboring provinces of Mosul and Basra, which had previously functioned with considerable autonomy.

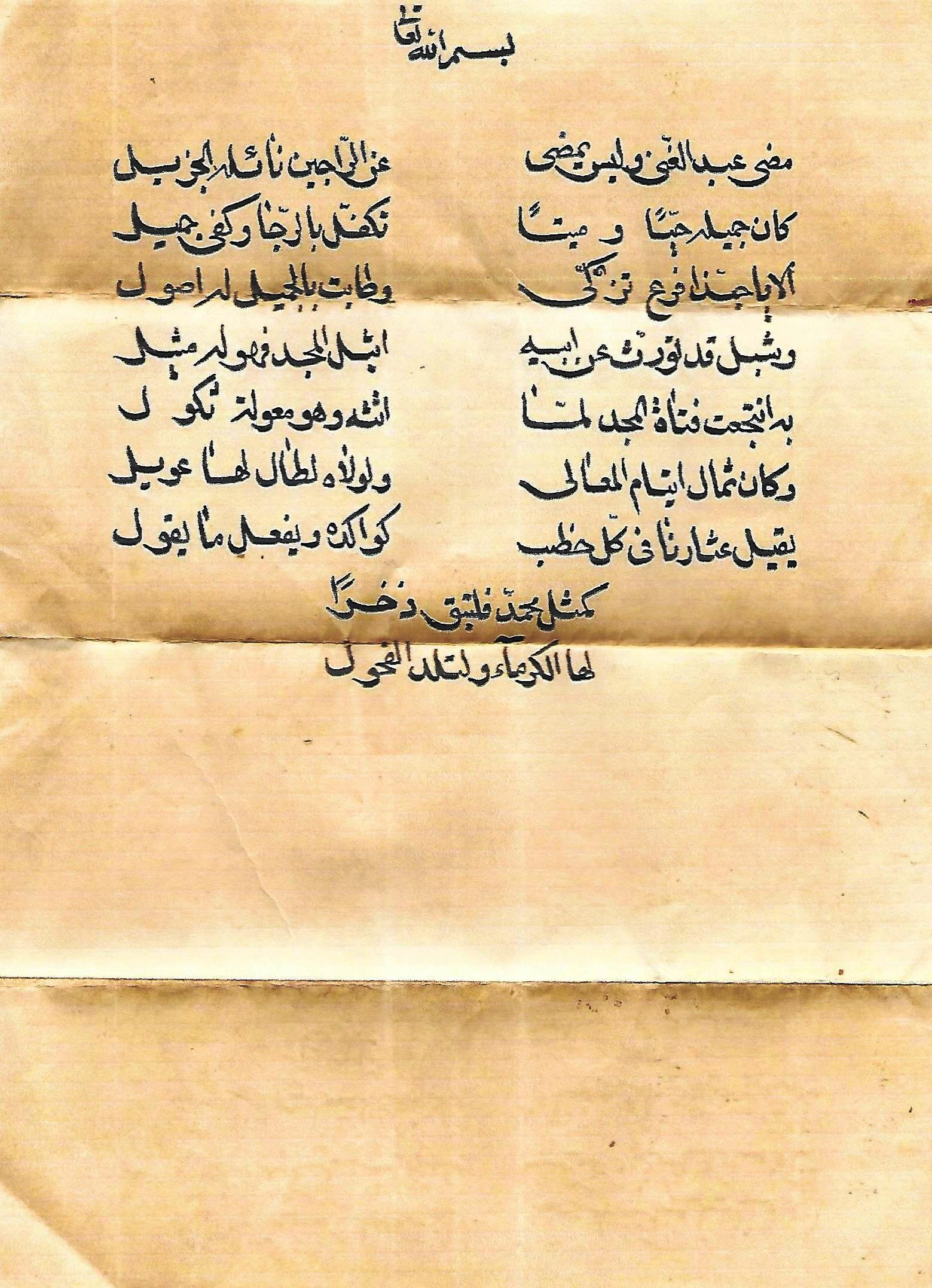
19th-century manuscript with verses lamenting Sheikh Abdul Ghani Al-Jamil, Mufti of Baghdad, who revolted against Ottoman governor Ali Rıza Pasha in 1832.

The Jalili family of Mosul, long entrenched as local rulers, was removed from power during Ali Rıza Pasha's tenure. In 1831, he appointed an Umari Pasha to replace Yahya Pasha Jalili as governor of Mosul, marking the first instance of Baghdad asserting control over the northern province. Although Yahya briefly retook Mosul by force in 1833, Ali Rıza Pasha launched a military campaign, recaptured the city, and had Yahya exiled to Tekirdağ. By 1834, under İnce Bayraktar Mehmed Pasha, the Baghdad-based administration appointed Mehmed Said Pasha as governor of Mosul, effectively institutionalizing Mosul's subordination to Baghdad.

Ahead of his military campaign, Ali Rıza Pasha sought support from major regional actors: while the sheikh of Ka‘b refused and sided with Davud Pasha, both Shammar al-Jarba and Kurdish Mehmed Bey of Rawanduz backed the Ottoman intervention. Meanwhile, Davud attempted to secure loyalty by distributing robes of honor (hil‘ats). The Sublime Porte issued a decree offering Davud and his family a full pardon if he left peacefully. When news of Davud's dismissal and Ali Rıza's appointment reached Basra and Kirkuk, it was met with public celebration, while in Baghdad, crowds plundered the provincial palace, demonstrating support for the new governor. Facing growing hostility and weakened by a plague that had decimated his forces, Davud Pasha fled and was captured without major resistance. He was later exiled to Bursa. His removal marked the recognition of Baghdad's new central role in the administration of Ottoman Iraq.

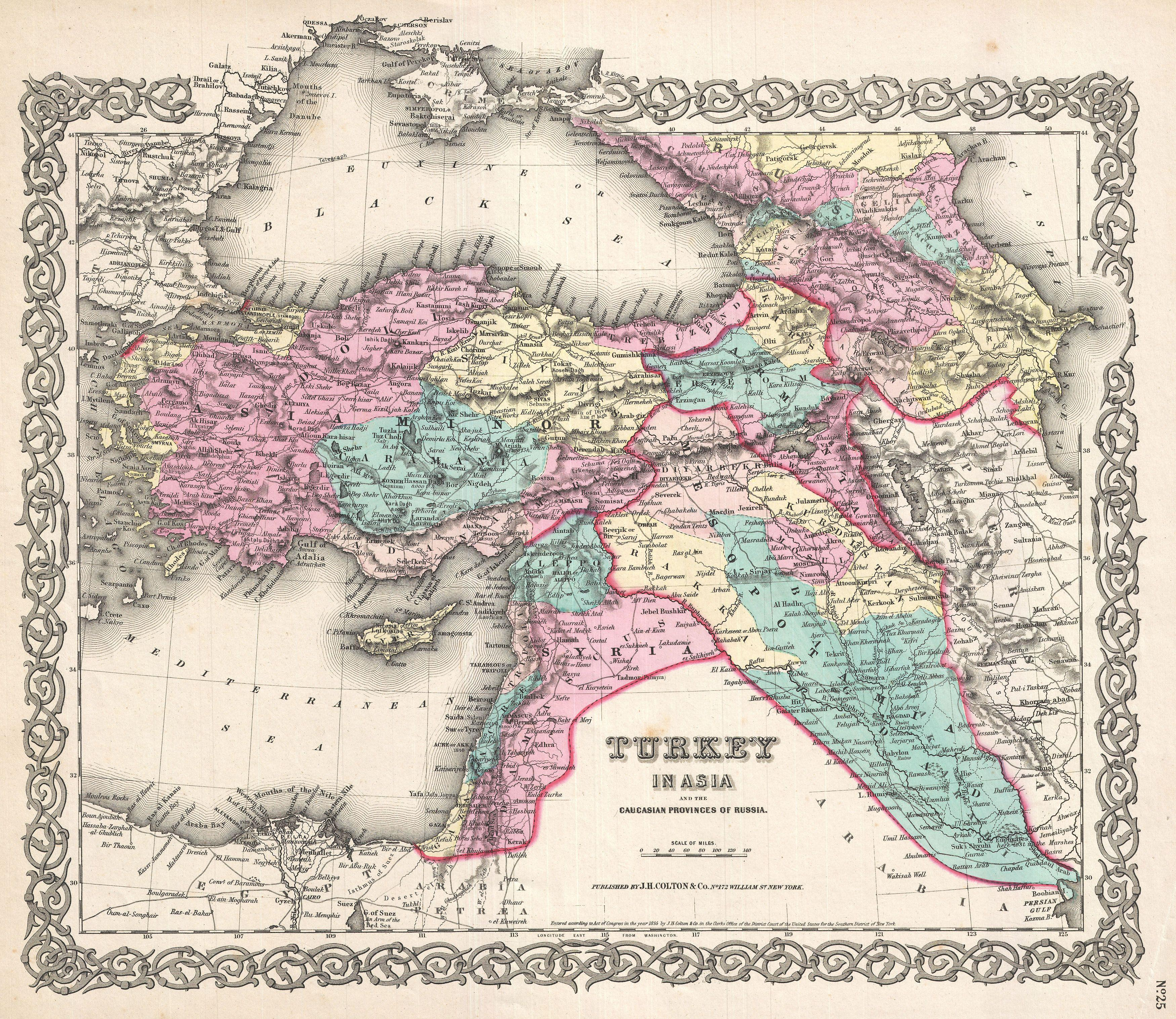
Ottoman Iraq (c. 1855). The map depicts provincial boundaries from the early 19th century, when the Jalilis in Mosul and the Kurdish emirates in Shahrizor still exercised semi-autonomous authority under the Mamluk administration of Iraq.

==== Consolidation of Baghdad's authority in northern Iraq (1833–1838) ====
The fall of the Mamluks and the Jalilis was soon followed by campaigns against the Kurdish emirates of Rawanduz, Bahdinan, and Baban, which had operated with near independence in northern Iraq. Although the emirates had long been nominally tied to the governor of Baghdad, their real autonomy persisted through the early 1830s. Between 1833 and 1838, Ottoman forces, coordinated by Ali Rıza Pasha and other provincial commanders, intervened militarily and administratively, bringing these emirates under direct rule. The emirate of Bahdinan was disbanded, Rawanduz's ruler Mir Kör was exiled, and Mehmed Said Pasha was appointed by Baghdad to govern Amadiyah. This process marked the extension of Baghdad's reach into northern Iraq and the collapse of one of the last pockets of local autonomy in the region.

==== Struggles over land, taxation, and provincial administration (1838–1847) ====
Following the centralization of Iraq under Baghdad by 1838, the Ottoman state shifted its focus from military reassertion to administrative integration. This next phase was marked by efforts to impose fiscal and bureaucratic reforms aligned with emerging Tanzimat principles, even before the official declaration of the Gülhane Edict in 1839. Governors appointed to Baghdad, such as İnce Bayraktar Mehmed Pasha and later Necip Pasha, were tasked with implementing imperial mandates including cadastral surveys (tapu), tax centralization, and the regulation of provincial appointments. However, the reforms faced entrenched resistance. The introduction of provincial tax collection offices (muhassıllık), already implemented in other provinces since the late 1830s, was delayed in Iraq due to fears of instability and local backlash. Attempts to extend the tapu system were obstructed by tribal leaders and urban notables who feared conscription and loss of fiscal autonomy, discouraging land registration and undermining state tax surveys.

Despite the formal goals of centralization and reform, Iraq remained constrained by entrenched administrative dysfunction. Between 1831 and 1872, roughly two-thirds of Baghdad's provincial administrations were marked by high-level corruption, including embezzlement, bribery, and extortion by governors such as Necip Pasha and Mustafa Nuri Pasha. Investigations into their conduct were opened but ultimately dropped or failed to yield convictions. This administrative breakdown hindered the Tanzimat's effectiveness in Iraq and undermined state legitimacy in the eyes of tribal and urban populations.

==== Institutionalizing tanzimat reforms in Iraq (1847–1851) ====
By 1847, the Ottoman state sought to replace Iraq's patchwork governance with formal administration. The creation of provincial councils (meclis-i kebîr) in Baghdad aimed to curb military dominance and anchor local rule within a bureaucratic framework. These councils included imperial officials and local notables, reflecting a strategy of controlled inclusion: bringing elites into government while limiting their autonomy.

To support this apparatus, the state revived direct tax collection (muhassıllık) and restructured tax farming, hoping to stabilize revenues and bypass local intermediaries. Yet governors like Necip Pasha (1842–1849) struggled to implement reforms beyond Baghdad. Necip's tenure was marked by embezzlement, the misuse of public funds, and an inability to enforce reform mandates. Though imperial investigations were launched, no accountability followed.

In the countryside, tribal leaders obstructed censuses, land surveys, and conscription through evasion or intimidation, maintaining effective autonomy despite official reforms. Urban elites, by contrast, adapted by joining newly formed councils to safeguard their influence, which often turned these institutions into arenas of negotiation rather than instruments of state control. Efforts to implement land reform through the tapu system were also largely symbolic: tribes rejected individual title deeds, and urban notables avoided registration to escape taxation and military service. As a result, land administration outside a few major towns remained informal and resistant to state intervention.

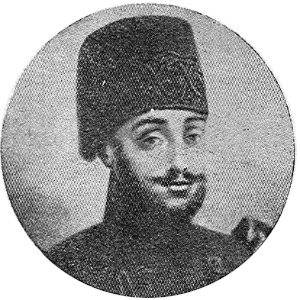
Namık Pasha, two-time Ottoman Viceroy of Baghdad, 1851–1852 and 1861–1868.

==== Military centralization and bureaucratic expansion (1851–1869) ====
In a report from the Sixth Army Command dated 1849 and addressed to the General Staff, the provinces of Baghdad, Basra, and Mosul were collectively referred to as the Hıtta-i Irakiyye. The report described persistent administrative, fiscal, and military problems across these three provinces and recommended reforms in conscription, taxation, and land management. With the appointment of Namık Pasha in 1851, the Ottoman government ended the prior division between civil and military command in Iraq by granting him both the governorship of Baghdad and the title of müşîr. This allowed Baghdad to function as the military and administrative center for all of Iraq. Under his tenure, the provinces of Basra, Kirkuk, and Mosul were formally brought under the jurisdiction of the Sixth Army, headquartered in Baghdad, making it the empire's regional command post.

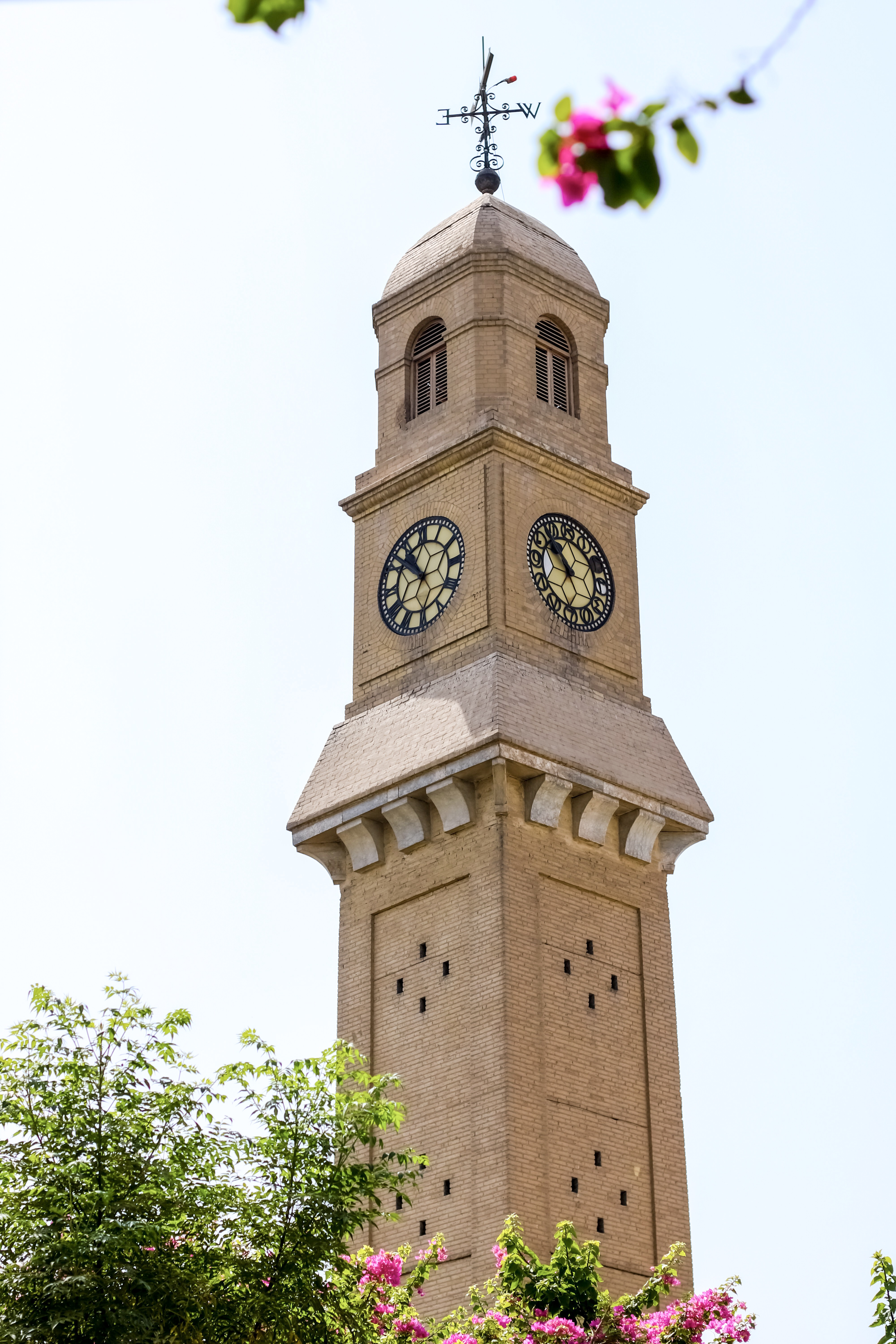
The Qushla Clock Tower in Baghdad, part of a barracks complex built by Namık Pasha in 1850; the clock was added by Midhat Pasha.

A key turning point came with the imperial firmân of 1852, which gave the governor direct control over subordinate officials, appointments, and financial matters, ending earlier tensions between governors and independent tax officials. Namık Pasha used this authority to appoint loyal governors to Basra and Mosul, enforce tax collection, and introduce conscription. The formation of military regiments stationed across major towns, including Hillah, Amarah, and Sulaymaniyah, extended Baghdad's coercive reach far beyond the capital. In Sulaymaniyah, for example, İsmail Pasha, a senior officer in the Sixth Army, served as kaymakam.

By the 1860s, administrative councils (meclis) were active not only in Baghdad but also in Basra and Mosul, now reporting to Baghdad's provincial center. Though resistance persisted in tribal zones, the integration of Iraq's provinces under Baghdad's command marked a critical advance in imperial consolidation.

=== 1869–1917: Reform, modernization, and decline ===
==== Midhat Pasha and the high tide of reform (1869–1872) ====
The appointment of Midhat Pasha as governor of Baghdad in 1869 marked the most ambitious phase of Ottoman reform in Iraq. Backed by the central government and imbued with Tanzimat ideals, Midhat undertook sweeping changes to transform Iraq from a militarized frontier into a modern, centrally administered province. His reforms focused on infrastructure, administration, taxation, and education, and are often seen as laying the groundwork for the modern Iraq.

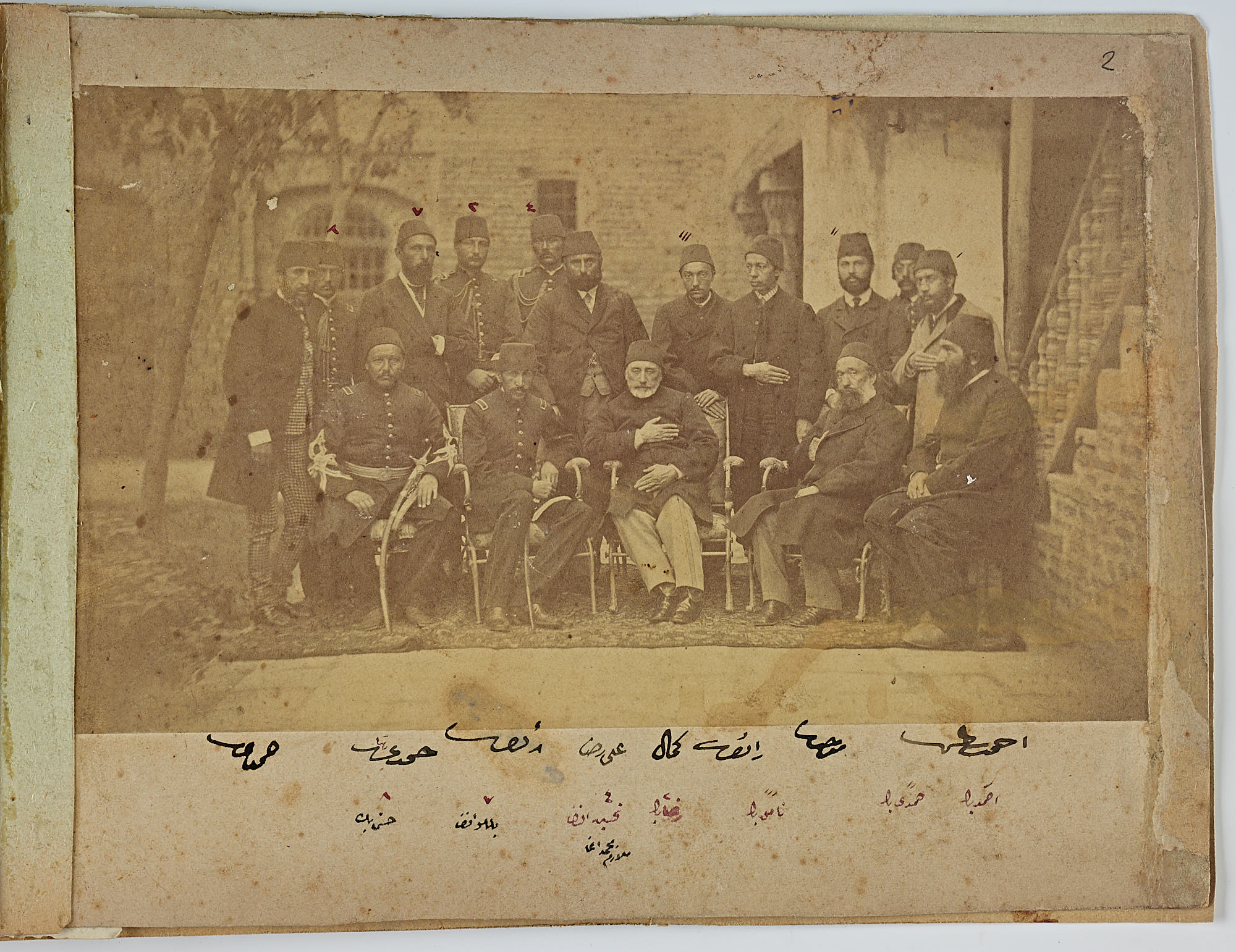
Midhat Pasha and his Erkân-i Vilâyet (Governing People of Wilayah) photographed together, along with writers and intellectuals, Baghdad, 1870.

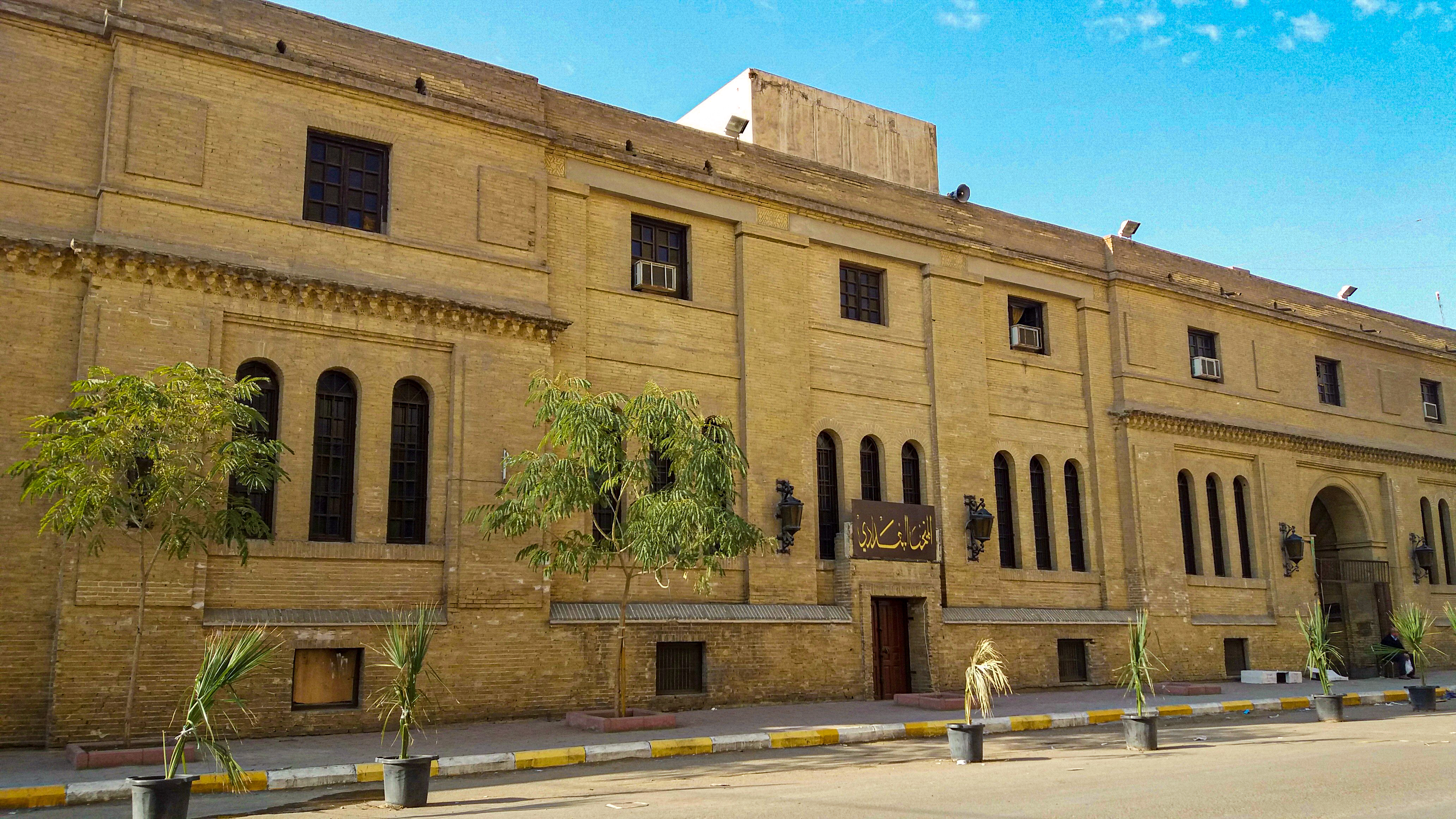
The Baghdadi Museum building, originally constructed in 1869 under Governor Midhat Pasha as Baghdad's state printing press.

One of his earliest measures was the completion of the land registration (tapu) system, which he enforced across Baghdad, Basra, and Mosul to clarify land ownership, increase tax collection, and curb tribal autonomy. He also implemented standardized taxation, ended tax farming in key areas, and introduced municipal councils with elected local representation.

Midhat's administration built new roads connecting Baghdad to Samarra, Hillah, and Basra, expanded steam navigation on the Tigris, and established a telegraph line from Baghdad to Istanbul. He also founded Iraq's first modern secondary schools (rüşdiye) and improved the provincial bureaucracy by training local officials.

Though his governorship lasted only three years, Midhat's reforms left a lasting institutional legacy. Baghdad's influence as the administrative capital of Ottoman Iraq increased, and his model of centralized, service-based governance would be referenced, though never fully replicated, by later governors.

==== Reform after Midhat: continuity and centralization (1872–1885) ====
Although Midhat Pasha's departure in 1872 slowed the pace of reform, his administrative blueprint remained influential. Successive governors continued to expand state infrastructure, bureaucracy, and military authority from Baghdad. The Vilayet Law of 1864, more fully applied after 1872, led to the creation of new subdistricts (kaymakamlıks) and councils (meclis), particularly in regions previously governed through indirect tribal rule. Basra, Mosul, and Kirkuk all saw increasing bureaucratic integration under Baghdad's oversight. For example, as early as 1850, a request to establish a meclis-i kebîr in Shahrizor was denied by the Sublime Porte on the grounds that such a council should first be established in Baghdad. The reasoning was that although Shahrizor was a separate province at the time, it was considered to be part of the Iraq region (hıtta-i Irakiyyenin bir kıt‘a-i müfrezesi), underscoring how the reforms were structured according to a clear provincial hierarchy that placed Baghdad at the center.

In a telegram dated September 24, 1879, Feyzi Pasha, the Governor of Mosul, appealed to Istanbul for an exemption on grain import duties, arguing that Mosul, being counted (maʿdûd) among the lands of Hıtta-i Irakiyye, should receive the same treatment as Baghdad. His appeal emphasized the region's interdependence and the risk of famine.

A major focus of this period was the strengthening of civil-military control. Officials doubled as tax collectors and local commanders, while provincial governors frequently rotated their subordinates to prevent the entrenchment of local alliances. In tribal zones, such as Nasiriyah, Amarah, and Sulaymaniyah, the state appointed tribal sheikhs to official posts, most notably the Muntafiq leader Abdul Ghafur al-Saadun, who became mutasarrıf of Nasiriyah in the 1880s. This co-optation strategy reflected a shift from confrontation to managed loyalty.

In parallel, the government continued to expand public services: new rüşdiye schools, telegraph stations, and steamship patrols were introduced along the Tigris and Euphrates, increasing state presence in previously peripheral zones. While tribal unrest remained a challenge, the infrastructure and administrative reach laid during this phase marked a significant deepening of Ottoman control.

==== Hamidian realignment and political centralization (1885–1908) ====
Under Sultan Abdülhamid II, Ottoman Iraq entered a new phase of imperial consolidation. Unlike the reformist Tanzimat governors, the Hamidian administration emphasized centralized control from Istanbul, surveillance, and loyalty over local experimentation. One of the most significant developments was the expansion of imperial land ownership: from the late 1880s onward, Abdülhamid acquired vast tracts of land in Baghdad, Hillah, and the southern Euphrates, officially managed by the Ministry of Religious Endowments (Evkaf Nezareti). These purchases were intended to secure tax revenue and weaken the autonomy of large tribal landholders.

Administrative centralization also intensified. Governors and mutasarrıfs were appointed directly from Istanbul and rotated frequently to prevent local entrenchment. The provincial councils (meclis) remained in place but functioned increasingly as rubber-stamp bodies, with limited influence over fiscal or legal policy. Censorship and bureaucratic hierarchy expanded sharply, and the use of Arabic in official correspondence was discouraged in favor of Ottoman Turkish, further marginalizing local elites.

At the same time, Abdülhamid's regime invested in communication infrastructure to enhance central control. Telegraph lines connected Baghdad and Basra to Istanbul, and a railway survey was conducted in preparation for the Baghdad Railway project, although construction did not begin until after 1903. These efforts, along with urban policing, school inspections, and increased documentation of land and population, signaled a shift from reform to control.

During this same period, the Ottoman state increasingly viewed Iraq not only as an administrative zone but as a strategic and ideological frontier with Iran. In response to growing Shiite missionary activity sponsored by Iranian clerics in the shrine cities of Najaf, Karbala, and Samarra, Ottoman officials enacted a series of region-wide countermeasures. These included prohibiting land purchases by Iranian pilgrims, promoting Sunni religious education, restricting Shiite presses, and discouraging intermarriage with Iranian nationals. Such policies were coordinated across Iraq to foster a sense of loyalty to the Ottoman state.

Despite these initiatives, discontent grew among tribal groups and Arab urban elites who felt increasingly excluded from meaningful participation. The growing gulf between imperial centralization and provincial realities set the stage for the political upheaval that would follow in the aftermath of the Young Turk Revolution in 1908.

== Economy ==
During the 19th century, Ottoman Iraq experienced significant economic transformation, driven by foreign trade, technological change, and imperial influence. The opening of the Suez Canal in 1869 and the expansion of British commercial networks integrated Iraq more fully into the global economy. Between 1864 and 1900, the value of exports from Baghdad rose from £181,000 to £1,838,000, while imports increased from £366,000 to £5,960,000. This represented a more than tenfold increase in exports and a sixteenfold increase in imports. The Iraqi economy shifted from subsistence-based agriculture to export-oriented production, especially in dates, grains, wool, and animal hides. Baghdad and Basra developed as major transit hubs connecting India, the Persian Gulf, and the Mediterranean through riverine and caravan trade routes.

=== Anatolian-Iraqi railway project ===
In an imperial railway concession contract dated 18 March 1902, during the reign of Sultan Abdülhamid II, the Ottoman government granted the Anatolian Railway Company, represented by Dr. Kurt Zander, a 99-year concession to construct and operate a railway line extending from Konya to Basra. The document, issued by the central government in Istanbul and overseen by the Ministry of Public Works (Nâfia Nezâreti), stated that the project was intended to serve for the purpose of increasing the prosperity, development, wealth, and trade of Imperial Anatolia and of Iraq (Anadolu-yı Şâhâne ile hatta: Irak’ın tezyîd-i ma‘mûriyet ve terakkî-i servet ve ticâreti zımnında). The contract lists several Iraqi towns and cities along the planned route, including Baghdad, Mosul, Tikrit, Samarra, Karbala, Zubayr, and Basra. The railway was to connect these Iraqi cities to the Anatolian network, and operational and technical conditions were outlined under imperial oversight, with financial guarantees and inspection procedures administered by Ottoman authorities.

== Aftermath and the legacy of Ottoman Iraq ==
=== Ottoman Iraq after World War I ===
Following World War I and the establishment of the British Mandate of Mesopotamia in 1920, Iraq emerged as a new political entity under British administration. Contrary to later claims that Iraq is an artificial state invented by British policy or the 1916 Sykes-Picot Agreement, Ottoman-era records consistently used the term Hıtta-i Irakiyye in official documents for the unified administrative region of Basra, Baghdad, Mosul, and Shahrizor. The "artificial state" idea was later promoted not only by Orientalist British officials, who depicted Iraq as a loose patchwork of provinces, but also by ethnonationalists within Iraq. Pan-Arabists, seeking a greater Arab ethnostate encompassing all Arab lands, rejected Iraq's western and southern borders and envisioned its absorption into a larger Arab nation. Pan-Kurdists, seeking a Kurdish ethnostate, likewise rejected Iraq's existing borders and claimed Kurdish-majority cities in northern Iraq for a greater Kurdistan. Both denied the Ottoman conception of Iraq as a unified region and treated its borders as illegitimate and temporary.

=== Nationality law ===
The administrative and legal legacy of Ottoman Iraq fundamentally undermined the concept of equal citizenship in the modern state. The 1924 Nationality Law, an adaptation of the 1869 Ottoman Nationality Law, codified a hierarchy of "authenticity" based on former imperial subjecthood, institutionalizing internal differentiation within Iraqi citizenship rather than equality. This framework allowed British officials and Iraqi ruling elites to marginalize native Shia Arabs and Kurds by labeling them as "Persian" subjects, a status their ancestors had often held merely as a strategic shield against Ottoman conscription and taxation, rather than out of any ties or loyalty to Persia. Despite their roots in Iraq, these populations were politically framed as a threat to the consolidation of the state to justify their exclusion from political power. This logic culminated under Saddam Hussein, who weaponized these 19th-century categories as a legal basis to classify two million native Iraqis, roughly 15% of the population, as "inauthentic" (taba'iyya), subjecting them to mass expulsion based on a perceived loyalty to Iran that did not reflect their actual identity or history. Between 40,000 and 400,000 Iraqis were expelled.

== See also ==
- Mamluk dynasty of Iraq
- List of Ottoman governors of Baghdad
- British Mandate of Mesopotamia

== Sources ==
- Taner, Melis (2020). "Illustrated Manuscripts Attributed to Baghdad". Caught in a whirlwind: a cultural history of Ottoman Baghdad as reflected in its illustrated manuscripts. Leiden; Boston: Brill. ISBN 978-9004412699.
- Ceylan, Ebubekir (2011). The Ottoman Origins of Modern Iraq: Political Reform, Modernization and Development in the Nineteenth Century Middle East. London: I.B. Tauris. ISBN 9781848854253.
- Azarbadegan, Zeinab (2018). "Imagined Geographies, Re-invented Histories: Ottoman Iraq as Part of Iran". Journal of the Ottoman and Turkish Studies Association. 5 (1). Indiana University Press: 115–141. doi:10.2979/jottturstuass.5.1.07.
- T.C. Başbakanlık Devlet Arşivleri Genel Müdürlüğü (1993). Musul – Kerkük ile İlgili Arşiv Belgeleri (1525–1919) [Archival Documents Related to Mosul and Kirkuk (1525–1919)] (in Turkish). Ankara: T.C. Başbakanlık Devlet Arşivleri Genel Müdürlüğü.
- Monshi, Eskandar Beg (1978) [1627]. Tārīkh-e ʻĀlamārā-ye ʻAbbāsī [History of Shah ʻAbbas the Great]. Vol. 1–2. Translated by Savory, Roger M. Boulder, Colorado: Westview Press.
- Longrigg, Stephen H. (1925). Four Centuries of Modern Iraq. Oxford: Oxford University Press.
- Çetinsaya, Gökhan (2006). Ottoman Administration of Iraq, 1890–1908. London: Routledge. ISBN 9780415341585.
- Nuri, Nahar Muhammed (2018). "Iraq Is Not Artificial: Iraqi Trends and the Refutation of the Artificial State Hypothesis". AlMuntaqa. 1 (3). Arab Center for Research and Policy Studies: 9–39. doi:10.31430/almuntaqa.1.3.0009. JSTOR 10.31430/almuntaqa.1.3.0009.
- Nasiri, Mirza Naqi (2008). Floor, Willem (ed.). Titles & Emoluments in Safavid Iran: A Third Manual of Safavid Administration. Translated by Willem Floor. Washington, D.C.: Mage Publishers. ISBN 978-1-933823-23-2.
- Floor, Willem (2001). Safavid Government Institutions. Costa Mesa, California: Mazda Publishers. ISBN 1-568591-35-7.
- Saleh, Zainab (2013). "On Iraqi Nationality: Law, Citizenship, and Exclusion". The Arab Studies Journal. 21 (1). Arab Studies Institute: 48–78. JSTOR 41968268.
- Husain, Faisal H. (2021). Rivers of the Sultan: The Tigris and Euphrates in the Ottoman Empire. Oxford: Oxford University Press. ISBN 9780197547298.
