= Arab Iraq =

Historical region

Arab Iraq or Arabian Iraq (Arabic: عراق العرب, romanized: ‘Irāq ul-‘Arab, lit. 'Iraq of the Arabs') was a historical geographical term used by medieval and early modern writers for the region of Iraq in Mesopotamia, often centered in Lower Mesopotamia. Its precise extent varied by author and period, and some sources describe Arab Iraq as corresponding roughly to much of modern Iraq.

The term "Arab Iraq" (Persian: عراق عرب, romanized: Irâq-e Arab) became commonly used in the Seljuk period (11th–12th centuries) as a way to distinguish the historical region of Mesopotamia (Iraq proper) from "Persian Iraq" (Persian: عراق عجم, romanized: Irâq-e Ajam), a region previously referred to as al-Jibal, associated with the historical region of Media. Persian Iraq and Arab Iraq were often referred to as "al-Iraqayn" (Arabic: العراقين) meaning "the two Iraqs" collectively. The mountainous territories between them, comprising Kurdistan, Luristan, and Bakhtiyari, could have fell under either region depending on the military situation, but often maintained a high degree of autonomy regardless.

Hamdallah Mustawfi had mentioned "ʿErāq-e Arab" or "the heart of Irānšahr" as one of the 20 provinces of Iran, and this approach to Iranian history and geography was adopted by others after the 13th century. Under Safavid rule, Arab Iraq consisted of the two provinces of Baghdad and Diyarbakr. During Nader Shah's campaign in Iraq in the Afsharid period, Mohammad Kazem Marvi (Nader Shah's financial officer) used the term “Arab Iraq” in his chronicle ʿĀlam-ārā-ye Nāderī, referring to spoils taken from "Kirkuk, Sulaymaniyah, and others, in the land of Arab Iraq". In the late 19th century, Ahmet Rifat (in Lugat-i Tarihiyye ve Cografiyye) referred to Arab Iraq in relation to neighbouring regions such as Al-Jazira and Kurdistan. Modern scholarship notes that Ottoman and Qajar geographical writings did not consistently distinguish Arab Iraq from al-Jazira, and that such terminology could reflect political claims, not just geography.

== Sources ==
- Lockhart, L. (1965). "D̲j̲ibāl". In Lewis, B.; Pellat, Ch. & Schacht, J. (eds.). The Encyclopaedia of Islam, Second Edition. Volume II: C–G. Leiden: E. J. Brill. p. 534. doi:10.1163/1573-3912_islam_SIM_2068. OCLC 495469475.
- Floor, Willem (2001). Safavid Government Institutions. Costa Mesa, California: Mazda Publishers. ISBN 1-568591-35-7.
- Nasiri, Mirza Naqi (2008). Floor, Willem (ed.). Titles & Emoluments in Safavid Iran: A Third Manual of Safavid Administration. Translated by Willem Floor. Washington, D.C.: Mage Publishers. ISBN 978-1-933823-23-2.
- Azarbadegan, Zeinab (2018). "Imagined Geographies, Re-invented Histories: Ottoman Iraq as Part of Iran". Journal of the Ottoman and Turkish Studies Association. 5 (1). Indiana University Press: 115–141. doi:10.2979/jottturstuass.5.1.07.
- Bosworth, C. E. (1998). "ʿERĀQ-E ʿAJAM(Ī)". In Yarshater, Ehsan (ed.). Encyclopædia Iranica. Vol. VIII/5: English IV–Eršād al-zerāʿa. London and New York: Routledge & Kegan Paul. p. 538. ISBN 978-1-56859-054-7.
