= Mosul Province =

Mosul Province may refer to:

- Nineveh Governorate in modern Iraq
- Mosul Province, Ottoman Empire
