= Mehmed Namık Pasha =

Ottoman military reformer (1804–1892)

Serasker Mehmed Emin Namık Pasha
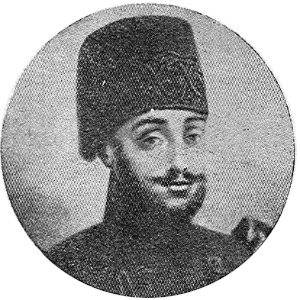

Viceroy of Baghdad
- In office 1861–1867
- Monarch: Abdulaziz
- In office 1851–1852
- Monarch: Abdülmecid I

Viceroy of Jeddah
- In office 1856–1860
- Monarch: Abdülmecid I

Ottoman Ambassador to the United Kingdom
- In office 1834–1836
- Monarch: Mahmud II

Personal details
- Born: Mehmed Emin Namık; 1804 Constantinople, Ottoman Empire
- Died: 1892 (aged 88) Constantinople, Ottoman Empire

Military service
- Allegiance: Ottoman Empire
- Branch/service: Ottoman Army
- Rank: Field marshal

Mehmed Emin Namık Pasha (1804 – 1892) was an Ottoman statesman and military reformer, who is considered to be one of the founding fathers of the modern Ottoman Army. He served under five Sultans and acted as counsellor to at least four of them. He founded the Mekteb-i Harbiye (The Ottoman Military Academy), was twice Viceroy of the province of Bagdad in Ottoman Iraq, was the first ambassador of the Sublime Porte at Saint-James's Court, was appointed Serasker (Supreme Commander of the Ottoman Army), he served as the Minister of War, became a Cabinet minister, and was conferred the title of Şeyh-ül Vüzera (Head of Imperial Ministers). During a long career that spanned a long lifetime (he lived to be eighty-eight), he was one of the personalities who shaped, as well as were themselves shaped by, what historian İlber Ortaylı called “the longest century” of the Ottoman state (İmparatorluğun En Uzun Yüzyılı, 1983).

== Biography ==
Mehmed Namık was born in Constantinople, the son of Halil Ramis Agha, an instructor at the Ottoman Court, whose grandfather, Ümmeti Konevî (Ümmet from Konya) had migrated from Konya. He was taught privately by his father until the age of fourteen, when, in 1816, he was appointed (as şakird - student apprentice) to the secretariat of the Divanı Hümayun (Imperial Cabinet) where he polished his education with courses in Arabic, Persian, grammar, Turkish elocution, and religious studies, as well as in French and English. He was sent to Paris during the reign of Sultan Mahmud II (1808–1839). Mahmud II selected him as one of the Divanı Hümayun şakirds to be sent to study in Europe, and attended the École Militaire there, improving at the same time his capacity of the French language he had already acquired.

On his return, one of the duties of Mehmed Namık Efendi, as a member of the secretariat of the Divanı Hümayun, was to join as second interpreter the Ottoman delegation which signed in 1826 the Akkerman Convention with the Russians. In 1826 also, the Order of Janissaries was dissolved, and in preparation for the restructuring of the military, he was given the job of translating French texts concerning military rules and regulations. As he did a good job, Sultan Mahmud II, who gave great importance to these texts, rewarded him in 1827 with the rank of alayemin, an act which, beyond being a token of appreciation, signaled Namık Efendi's entry into the ranks of the military. A year later Mehmed Namık Bey was promoted to the rank of lieutenant colonel, and was sent to Saint-Petersburg as military attaché with the duty first and foremost of studying the organization of the Russian army. He returned a year later, to be appointed as colonel to a regiment which he succeeded to turn into an exemplary regiment. He was made brigade-general for his efforts in 1832.

Namık Pasha was sent the same year as special envoy to London, with the rank of ambassador plenipotentiary, to ask for naval assistance against the insurgent Khedive Mohammed Ali of Egypt whom France was protecting. He was received by King William IV in due pomp but the British proved ultimately unable to provide what he requested. He did however, take advantage of the opportunity: he secured arms from the U.K., and obtained the possibility of fourteen students to be sent by the Ottoman government to study in artillery, infantry and naval schools in the U.K. In fact, he spent all the time he had left from visits of courtesy he was obliged to make, on touring military schools, factories, and shipyards—although he also befriended the likes of Talleyrand, a French ambassador in London at the time. For example, one of the technological advancements he brought back was an improved lamp for Lighthouses.

=== Co-founder of Mekteb-i Harbiye ===
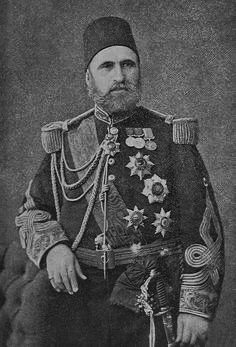
Marshal Ahmed Fevzi Pasha, one of the founding fathers of the modern Ottoman army

Once back in Istanbul, Namık Pasha reintegrated his post as brigade-general. When the establishment of a military college for officers became indispensable, it is to Namık Pasha, alongside Marshal Ahmed Fevzi Pasha, already the director of a military school in Selimiye, that the Sultan turned to entrust in 1834 the organization and administration of the Mekteb-i Harbiye. Today the College, which boasts of having had Mustafa Kemal (Atatürk) as a student, has been moved from Constantinople to Ankara and is called Kara Harp Okulu (School of War for Ground Forces), which is still functioning.

=== Ambassador to London ===
On his dispatches from London, Namık Pasha had indicated the necessity of a permanent representative of the Sublime Porte in such capitals as Paris and London. When an embassy was indeed opened in London, it fell to Namık Pasha to be the first to fill the post. He remained in London from 1834 to 1836, and had contacts with statesmen such as Palmerston and Wellington. Namık Pasha was well received in London, and displayed both fluency with language but also at adapting to local social customs.

=== Naval Commander ===
On his return to the Ottoman capital, and once again serving as general, he was made ferik (a rank between general and marshal, instituted after the dismantling of the Janissary Order), and was sent to Trablus (Tripoli in today's Libya) alongside Tahir Pasha to fight rebellious troops. Fifteen months later the rebellion had been crushed and for his valor Namık Pasha was promoted (1837/1838). (Sultan Abdülmecit began reigning in 1839.) This military success was a turning point in his career as it paved the way for his many positions as army commander and imperial administrator, and steered him away from diplomacy.

=== Commander of the Arabian Army ===
Various other posts followed and in 1843, elevated to being a vezir (imperial minister), Namık Paşa was appointed Commander of the Arabian Army, with the rank of Müşir (Marshall), a position he would assume a year later and would carry for five years.

=== Viceroy of the Province of Baghdad ===
In 1851 he was made Marshall of the Iraqi and Hejaz armies and viceroy of the province of Baghdad — only to be called back a year later (in 1852) because the way he had dealt with one of the cases of rebellion had caused an upset — to his own immense satisfaction however, as he wrote in his letters, since he had been away from Istanbul for nine consecutive years. British Major General Henry Rawlinson wrote a letter dated 1852 to then Foreign Secretary Malmesbury, strongly criticizing Namık Pasha's harsh approach to maintaining order.

=== Minister of Commerce ===
Awarded a medal for the second rank of the Mecidî Order, Namık Pasha was made on his return, first, Marshall of Tophane (1852); then, Minister of Commerce (1853).

The Crimean War saw the Ottoman state in dire need and it was to Namık Paşa, as Minister of Commerce, that the duty fell of looking for funds in Europe, a venture which took him to Paris and London for the whole of winter during 1853-1854 (from November to May) and during which he was received by Napoleon III. However, he had come back empty-handed. Commentators are at variance in interpreting this outcome: the directives he was given were too rigid and he was not vested with sufficient authority to make the necessary decisions. For some he was too proud on behalf of the Ottoman state, for others; the interest rates insisted by the European bankers were too high and the parties were mutually too hesitant, and too distrustful, according to others. “It had become very clear that the Porte would not be able to borrow without the guarantees of the allied governments. Thus it was rather the Porte's instructions, the political conjuncture, problems with the credibility of the Porte and attitudes of the British ministers that ... really prevented the loan's materialization rather than Namık Pasha's 'amateurishness' and unwillingness. Under such conditions, anyone in his place could be equally unsuccessful,” according to one commentator (see Badem, p. 273). History would nevertheless record his name as the man who initiated the search for the loans, as these would be secured very soon after, as a result of the steps he had taken and the paths he had opened.

=== Viceroy of Jeddah ===
Several other posts, administrative or diplomatic, ensued. He was appointed viceroy of Jeddah in 1856, then was made President of the Military Council in 1860, and later Serasker (Commander in chief). During Namık Pasha's term as Viceroy of Jeddah, a blundering move by the local British Vice-Consul and a ham-fisted military intervention by the British marines in a property dispute led to events that ended in the death of 22 foreigners including the British Consul and his wife, as well as the French Consul's wife. Namık Pasha was away at Mecca during the events, and dealt swiftly with the aftermath on his return, though not before the bombardment of Jeddah by HMS Cyclops, while authority from the Sultan was awaited. However he would nevertheless be held responsible in the eyes of England.

In 1860 Namık Pasha was nominated by the Ottoman Empire to be the Ottoman special envoy to Syria. However, France and England opposed this appointment, in part possibly due to resentment over the events in Jeddah, and the Porte appointed Fuad Pasha instead.

=== Viceroy of Baghdad, Basra and Mosul ===
A year later, in 1861 (the year Sultan Abdülaziz ascended the throne), he was sent on his second and longer post as viceroy to the province of Baghdad, to which were added the provinces of Basra and Mosul — in fact, the present-day Iraq. He succeeded in quieting down rebellious tribes and accomplished much in the way of construction. He replenished the Basra shipyard with ships he ordered from Istanbul, increased the traffic on the Euphrates and Tigris Rivers, had bridges built, and made the land arable through irrigation. He had various government buildings, military barracks, schools and roads constructed. He made sure the customs revenue would enter the Baghdad treasury, increased commerce, put a stop to fraudulent practices in title deeds and thus was able to regularize tax revenue. In 1867, when he returned, he brought to the public's purse in Istanbul a considerable amount of money as his office had amassed in Baghdad.

For his achievements in Baghdad, he received the medal of the first rank of the Order of Osman. The Shah of Iran also presented him with a medal.

Namık Pasha commissioned the construction, with his own savings, of a building to house the Ministry of War, the edifice which now functions as Istanbul University's main building in Beyazit and has come to symbolize “university” in Turkey.

=== Minister of Naval Forces ===
In 1872 he was made Minister of Naval Forces, and selected as a member of the Meclis-i Âyân (Ottoman Senate) in 1877. (Sultan Abdülhamid II acceded to the throne in 1876). He was a member of the delegation which signed the Edirne Armistice with the Russians after the 1877-1878 war.

Among the various titles he held was also that of yaver-i ekrem (aide de camp to His Imperial Majesty), and it is in that capacity that he carried a note from the Sultan to Alexander II. He received from the latter the medal of the Alexander Nevsky Order.

He was made Şeyh-ül Vüzera in 1883.

Namık Pasha spent the last years of his life in retirement in the konak he owned that extended from Ayapaşa to Kabataş. It is in that mansion that he played host to Empress Eugénie when she came to Constantinople. The "Namık Paşa Yokuşu" street in the area where his estate had been is named after him.

His death marked the end of an epoch.

As befits an Ottoman grandee, he was married four times but divorced one of his wives. From the other three, he had eleven children.

His descendants live today mostly in Turkey (although some are located in the US, the U.K., France, Egypt, Jordan and Saudi Arabia), and many are prominent personalities in the Turkish mainstream. His late great-grandson, Ahmet Sinaplı, authored Şeyhül Vüzera, Serasker Mehmet Namık Paşa, the only monograph so far dedicated to this Ottoman statesman who had represented throughout his life the proud and refined face of the Ottoman Empire.

== Sources ==
- Akalın, Şehabeddin. “Mehmed Namık Paşa.” Tarih Dergisi ıv(1953)7:127-145.
- Badem, Candan. “The Ottomans and the Crimean War.” Unpublished Ph.D. dissertation. Sabancı University, 2007.
- Cetinsaya, Gokhan. Ottoman Administration of Iraq, 1890-1908. London and New York: Routledge, 2006.
- Ortaylı, İlber. İmparatorluğun En Uzun Yüzyılı. 1983. İstanbul: İletişim Yayınları, 2000.
- Sinaplı, Ahmet Nuri. Şeyhül Vüzera, Serasker Mehmet Namık Paşa. İstanbul: Yenilik Basımevi, 1987.
