= Shahrizor Eyalet =

Administrative division of the Ottoman Empire from 1554 to 1862

Arabic: إيالة شهرزور Ottoman Turkish: ایالت شهر زور
- Eyalet of the Ottoman Empire
- 1554–1862
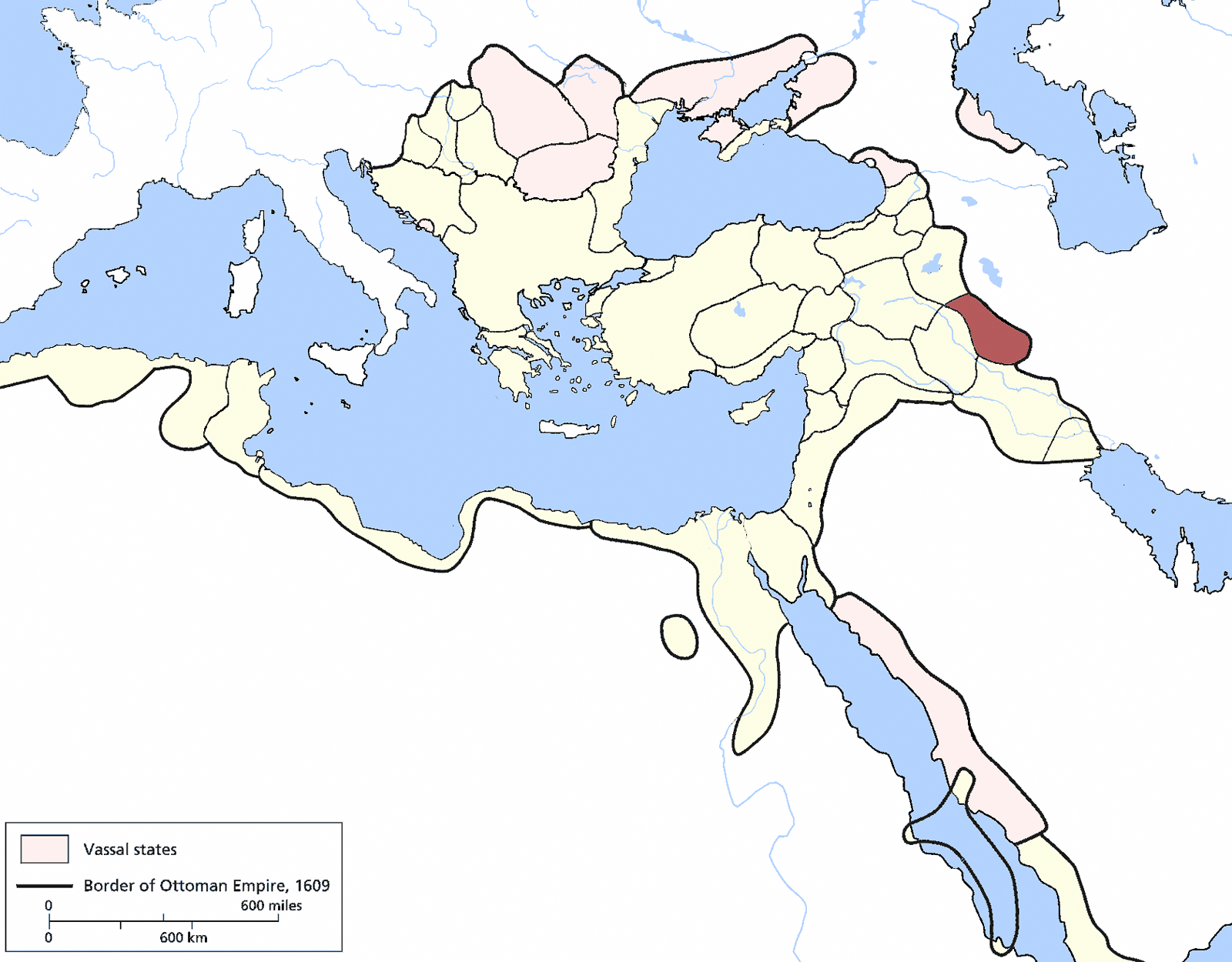
- The Sharazor Eyalet in 1609
- Capital: Kirkuk; Sulaymaniyya (after 1784)
- History
  - Established: 1554
  - Disestablished: 1862
| Preceded by | Succeeded by |
| Safavid Empire | Baghdad Eyalet |
- Today part of: Iraq; Iran

Shahrizor Eyalet (Arabic: إيالة شهرزور, Ottoman Turkish: ایالت شهر زور, romanized: Eyālet-i Šehr-i Zōr) was a semi-independent eyalet in Ottoman Iraq (hıtta-i Irakiyye), covering the area of present-day Iraqi Kurdistan.

== History ==
When the Ottoman Empire conquered the region in 1554, they decided to leave the government of the region to Kurdish leaders, so it was not incorporated directly into the Ottoman administrative system. The governors were members of Kurdish clans, and only rarely were there Ottoman garrisons in the province.

However, archival records from the 16th century onwards indicate that localities commonly associated with Shahrizor, including İmadiye, Erbil, Kerkük, and Zâho, were, at various times, listed as sanjaks within the Baghdad Eyalet. Ottoman administrative registers from 1558–1576 and 1573–1587 enumerate these settlements as subordinate districts of Baghdad. During the period of Mamluk rule in Iraq (1704–1831), Shahrizor was administered as one of the three eyalets under the authority of the Mamluk pashas, alongside Basra and Baghdad.

=== Dominance of the Baban Emirate ===
In the 18th and 19th centuries, the eyalet came to be dominated by the Baban clan. The members of this clan were able to maintain their rule by guaranteeing the security of the Ottoman Empire's volatile border with Iran in exchange of almost full autonomy. The Sanjak of Baban, which included the town of Kirkuk, was named after the family.

The Baban considered the Kurdish princes of Ardalan, who controlled the Iranian portions of Kurdistan, to be their natural rivals, and in 1694 Sulayman Beg Baban invaded Iran and defeated the mir of Ardalan. After 1784, the Babans moved their capital to the new town of Sulaymaniya, which was named after the dynasty's founder.

In 1850 the rule of the Babans was finally brought to an end, and in that same year, a request to establish a grand council (meclis-i kebîr) in Shahrizor was denied by the Sublime Porte. The justification was that such administrative reforms should begin in Baghdad first. This suggests that although Shahrizor had previously held provincial status, it was still regarded as a sub-region of Ottoman Iraq (hıtta-i Irakiyyenin bir kıt‘a-i müfrezesi), and that Tanzimat reforms were implemented through a centralized provincial hierarchy led by Baghdad. The region was placed under the direct control of the governor of Baghdad in 1862. However, the fall of the Babans led to a deterioration of the relations between the Kurdish clans, and the resulting anarchy was only ended with the rise of another Kurdish clan, the Barzanji, in the early 20th century.

=== Other Kurdish Emirates in the Region ===
During the Mamluk period (1704–1831), the Georgian-origin pashas who ruled Baghdad maintained pragmatic relationships with Kurdish emirates across the region. In exchange for military assistance, particularly against Arab tribes and rival Kurdish factions, these emirates were granted significant autonomy. In many cases, Kurdish rulers and the Baghdad administration collaborated against competing Kurdish factions to preserve the regional balance of power. The emirates were often exempt from direct taxation and governed their territories with minimal interference, so long as they did not threaten the broader security and stability of Ottoman Iraq.

The Rawanduz (Soran) Emirate, based in Rawanduz, rose to prominence under Emir Muhammad Kör in the 1820s and 1830s. He significantly expanded his authority, reaching Erbil, İmadiye, Zâho, and even Mardin, and minted his own coins, effectively operating as a regional power. Although initially tolerated and even supported by the Ottoman administration in Baghdad as a counterweight to Persian influence, his growing autonomy led to military intervention in 1835. Ottoman forces, led by Reşid Pasha and coordinated with Baghdad and Mosul officials, subdued the emirate. Muhammad Kör was exiled to Istanbul, where he died under unclear circumstances in 1836. Afterward, Rawanduz came under direct Ottoman administration and declined into a relatively minor district.

The Bahdinan Emirate, centered on İmadiye, experienced growing pressure from both the Rawanduzi expansion and the central Ottoman government. While its leadership briefly survived the fall of Rawanduz, the emirate was fully annexed by 1838 following coordinated campaigns by the governors of Baghdad and Mosul, part of a broader imperial consolidation.

The Botan Emirate, led by Bedirhan Bey, held a semi-autonomous position into the 1840s. As with other Kurdish emirates, the Tanzimat reforms threatened its political autonomy, particularly when Jizrah was administratively transferred from Diyarbakır to Mosul. Bedirhan responded with revolt. His attacks on the Nestorian Christian communities in 1843 and 1846 provoked international condemnation. In 1847, an Ottoman campaign, again routed through the provincial command structure of Mosul and Baghdad, ended in Bedirhan’s defeat and exile to Istanbul. The emirate’s territories were formally absorbed into the provincial system thereafter.

== Administrative divisions ==
Sanjaks of Sharazor Eyalet in the 17th century:

1. Sarujek
2. Erbil
3. Kesnan
4. Sheher-bazar
5. Jenguleh
6. Jebel-hamrin
7. Hazar-Mardud
8. Alhuran
9. Merkareh
10. Hazir
11. Rudin
12. Tiltari
13. Sebeh
14. Zenjir (Zinjir Kale in Tamar)
15. Ajub
16. Abrumaz
17. Pak
18. Perteli
19. Bilkas
20. Aushni
21. Kala-Ghazi
22. Sanjak of Shahrizor

Sanjaks between 1680 and 1702:

1. Sanjak of Shahrizor
2. Hûdî (Didan Tribe)
3. Cebel
4. Kızılca Kale
5. Serücek
6. Şehr-i Bazâr
7. Zengene
8. Bâvî
9. Erbil
10. Karadağ
11. Köy
12. Şembarân
13. Kâddaş and Alan
14. Ça'an Gediği
15. Şemâmek
16. Dulkıran
17. Beye (Baban)
18. Hezârmerd
