= Sanjak of Shahrizor =

Ottoman Sanjak (1534–1918)

Kurdish: سەنجەقی شارەزوور Ottoman Turkish: سنجاق شهرزور
- Sanjak of the Ottoman Empire
- 1534–1918
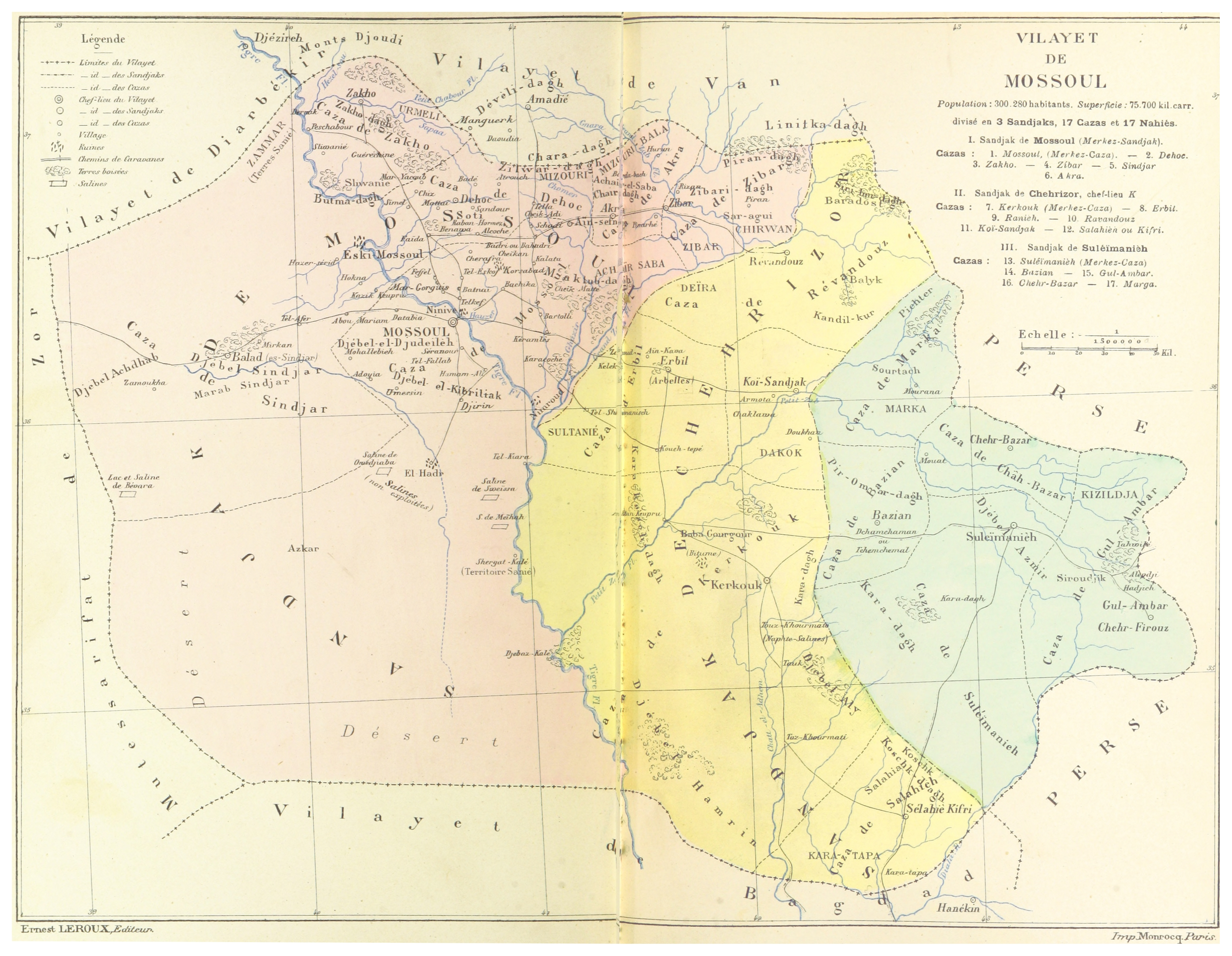
- A map of the Mosul vilayet in 1892, the Shahrizor Sanjak (here Chehrizor) is shown in yellow, between the two other sanjaks.
- Capital: Kirkuk
- Population
  - 1912: 89,573
- History
  - Established: 1534
  - Renamed "Shahrizor Sanjak": 1869–1872
  - Renamed "Kirkuk Sanjak": 1891/92
  - Armistice of Mudros: 1918
Preceded by	Succeeded by
Safavid Empire	Mandatory Iraq
- Today part of: Kurdistan Region (Iraq)

The Sanjak of Shahrizor (Kurdish: سەنجەقی شارەزوور, Ottoman Turkish: سنجاق شهرزور), previously the Sanjak of Baban, later briefly renamed to the Sanjak of Kirkuk (Kurdish: سەنجەقی کەرکووک) (Ottoman Turkish: سنجاق كركوك), was a second-level administrative division (Sanjak) of the Ottoman Empire, founded in 1534. The name Shahrizor comes from the region of the same name, which likely means "kingly forest". The capital and largest city of the sanjak was Kirkuk. The sanjak was made up of 1,712 Villages across 6 Kazas and 17 Nahiyahs. The Shahrizor Sanjak was initially a sanjak of the Eyalet of Shahrizor, though later it was part of the Mosul vilayet, lying between the Mosul and Sulaymaniyah Sanjak. It was dissolved with the Armistice of Mudros in 1918.

== History ==
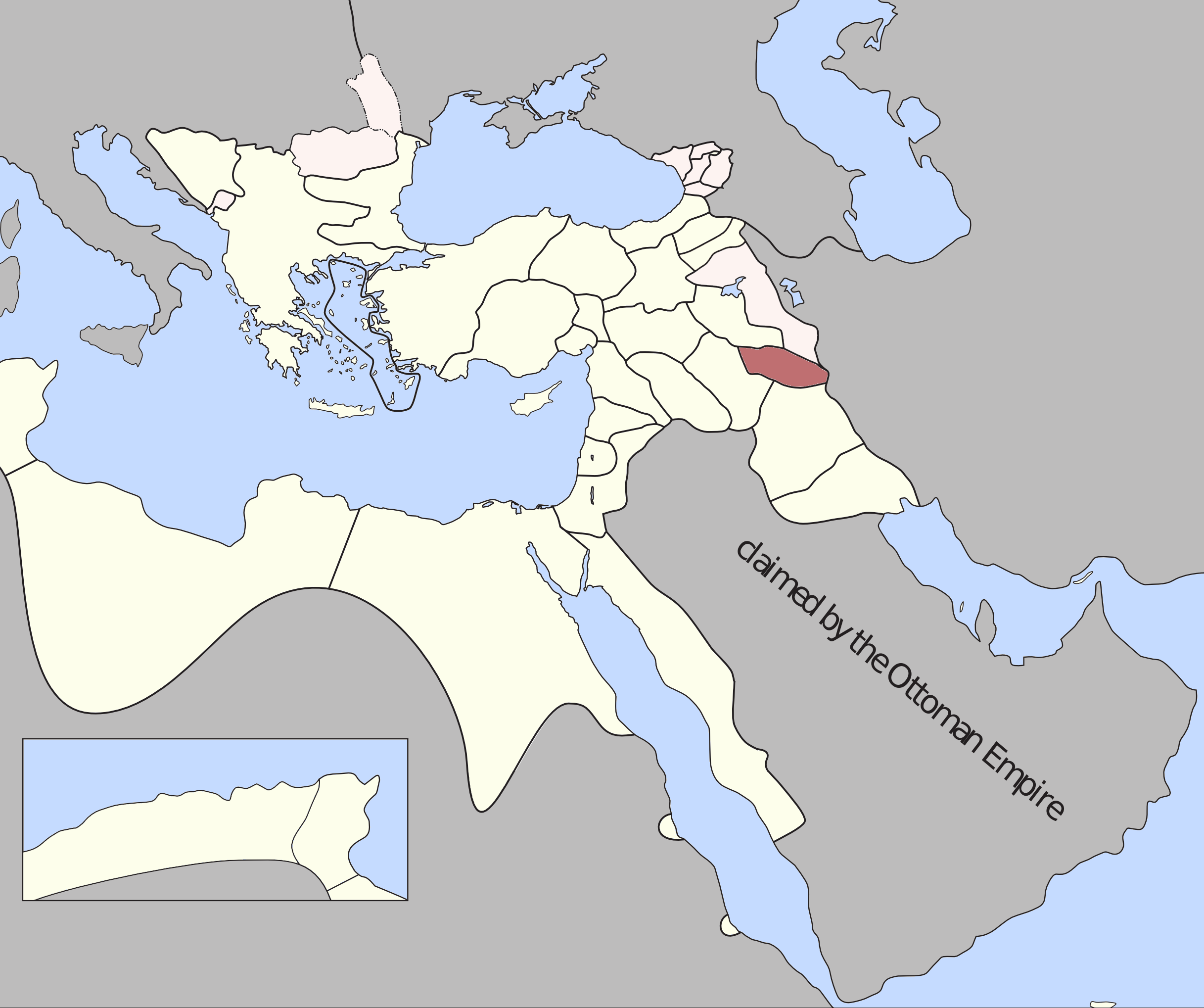
The Ottoman Empire in 1795, in red the Shahrizor Eyalet, which included the Baban Sanjak (later Shahrizor Sanjak).

In 1534, the Ottoman Empire incorporated the importend cities of Erbil and Kirkuk into its domains, along with most of present-day Iraq, leading to the creation of a sanjak. The Kurdish Baban family had much power over this sanjak during the 18th and 19th century, thus the sanjak was named "Sanjak of Baban". At this time it was a sanjak of the Eyalet of Shahrizor (also Baban ruled). The importance of Kirkuk grew in the 18th century when the Baban clan had fully established themselves there, making it the official capital of the sanjak and of the eyalet.

Following the reforms of Midhat Pasha, who served as governor of Baghdad between 1869 and 1872, the sanjak's name was changed to "Sanjak of Shahrizor", by that time the Baban clan was not in power anymore. In 1891/92 (1309 A.H.) the then Sultan of the Ottoman Empire, Abdul Hamid II, renamed the "Sanjak of Shahrizor" to "Sanjak of Kirkuk" to stop spelling mistakes and confusion between "Shehr-i-Zor" and "Sanjak of Zor". The new name would not last long as the Ottomans lost control over Iraq in 1918 with the Armistice of Mudros.

== Geography ==
There are three large rivers within the borders of the sanjak, the Great Zab, the Little Zab and Diyala rivers. All of them were very useful in the irrigation of the land. Overall the sanjak was very fertile, but it had not efficiently benefited from its products, because the agricultural tools were extremely outmoded and the means of transportation were insufficient and irregular. The sanjak had domestic animals such as sheep, goats, cows, oxen, water buffalo, horses, donkeys and camels. Excellent horses could be found around the capital Kirkuk. Ancient ruins show that the sanjak's plains were irrigated by large water channels, coming from the Lesser Zab, Greater Zab and Tigris rivers.

== Demographics ==
The sanjak was populated by Arabs, Assyrians, Jews, Kurds and Turkics. The Kurds and Arabs of the sanjak were divided into multiple tribes and clans. The majority of the population in the rural areas were Kurds, Kurds themselves also lived in Kirkuk, they were the regions majority overall. The Turkic population was concentrated in the urban areas, particularly in Kirkuk. Arabs lived in both rural and Urban areas. The entire sanjak had 1,712 villages.

=== Kirkuk City ===
According to Şemseddin Sâmi, who visited Kirkuk city in the late 19th century, Kurds made up three-quarters of Kirkuk, with the rest being Turks, Arabs, Jews and Assyrians. At that time, around 1894/95, Kirkuk had a population of 29,140 people. By the early 20th century Iraqi Turkmen were the majority in the city centre, and thus Kirkuk's population had become predominantly Turkmen.

== Subdivisions ==
The sanjak had 6 Kazas; Kirkuk, Rawadiz, Koy Sanjaq, Raniye, Salahiye and Erbil. And 17 Nahiyahs.
