= Tapu (Ottoman law) =

Permanent lease of farmland to a peasant family in Ottoman law

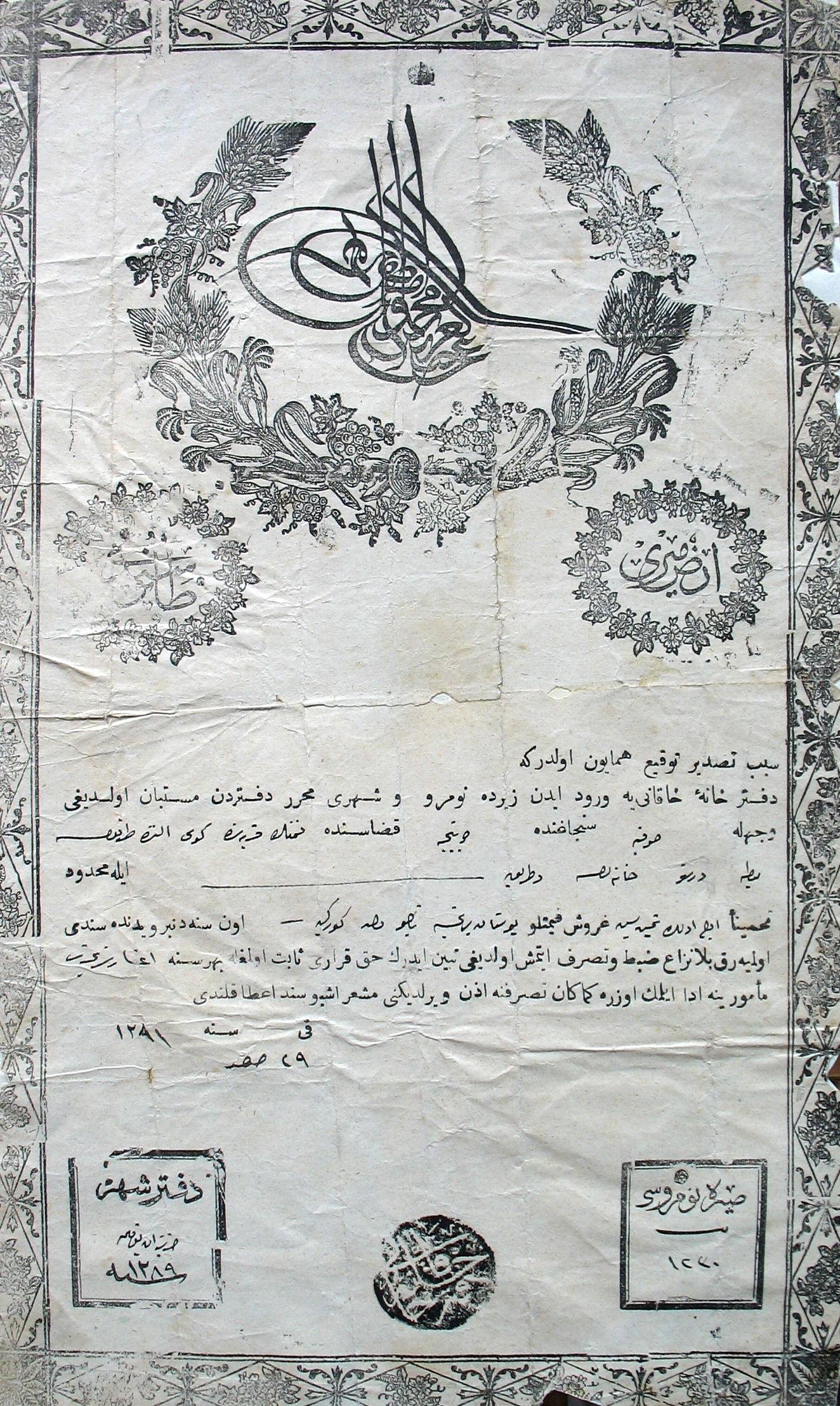
Tapia for a property from the XIX century, Historical Museum, Dupnitsa, Bulgaria

Tapu (also Tabu) was a permanent lease of state-owned arable land to a peasant family in the Ottoman Empire. The term was also used to indicate the title deed that certified tapu rights.

In Palestine, the Turkish word "tapu" was pronounced "tabu" by Arabic speakers, and has been carried over into Hebrew as such.

The family head acquired the usufruct of the land and was able to transmit this right to his male descendants upon his death. In return, he pledged to cultivate the land on a continuous basis and to meet a series of fiscal requirements and obligations to fulfill specific services to the state or to the sipahis.

Tapu is the basis of the Ottoman agrarian system revolving around family-scale units called çifthane.

== See also ==
- Economic history of the Ottoman Empire
- Tax farming
- Timar
- Israeli land and property laws
