= Nader Shah's Mesopotamian campaign =

Part of the Ottoman-Persian war (1730-35)

Mesopotamian Campaign
- Part of the Ottoman–Persian War (1730–1735) and Nader's Campaigns
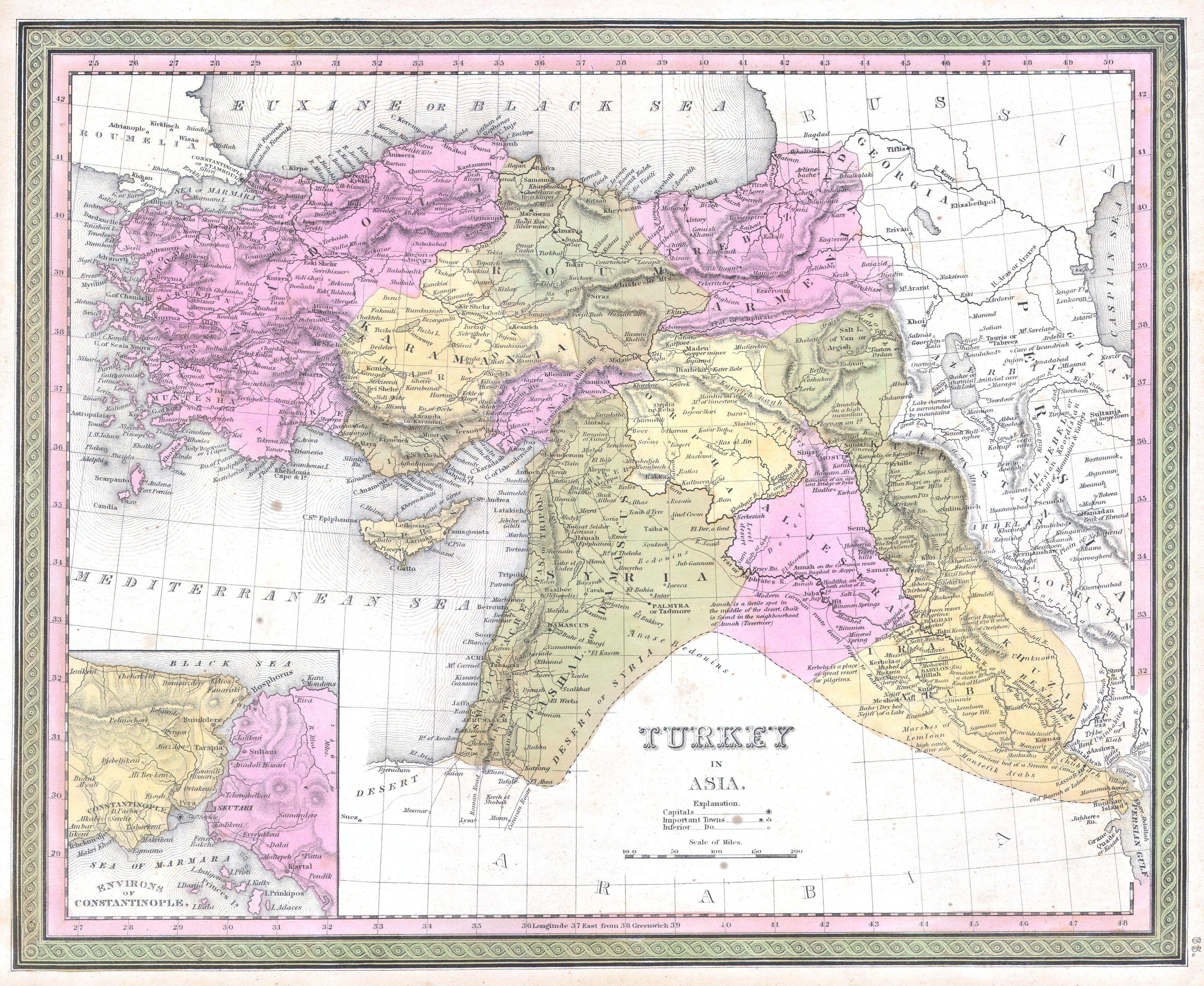
- A Map of the Ottoman Near East
Date	December 10, 1732 – December 19, 1733
Location	Ottoman Iraq
Result	Inconclusive
Territorial changes	Status quo ante bellum

Belligerents
Safavid Empire	Ottoman Empire

Commanders and leaders
Nader	Topal Osman Pasha †; Memish Pasha †; Ahmad Pasha

Strength
100,000+	100,000+

Casualties and losses
Baghdad: Heavy; Samarra: ~30,000; Kirkuk: Negligible	Baghdad: ~100,000 civilians Samarra: 20,000; Kirkuk: 20,000

The Mesopotamian Campaign of 1732–1733 was a military conflict during the eventful Ottoman–Persian War (1730–1735). As a direct result of Tahmasp II's blunders in his ill fated invasion of the Ottoman Caucasus all of Nader's previous gains in the theatre were lost and a humiliating treaty had been signed giving away hegemony over the Caucasus to Istanbul. This settlement gave Nader the authority to force Tahmasp's abdication and resume the war against the Turks by launching an invasion of Ottoman Iraq.

The Afsarid chronicler Mohammad Kazem Marvi records in his 'Alam-ara-ye Nadiri that Nader's forces captured spoils from “Kirkuk, Erbil, Sulaymaniyah, and others in the land of Arab Iraq”, seizing a sum of “one hundred and forty thousand horses, camels, and mules” from them.

== Strike into Iraq ==
Ottoman held Iraq seemed a peculiar choice for Nader's invasion as all the western territories of Persia were restored under the ignominious treaty signed by Tahmasp with the Caucasus under Turkish control. Axworthy speculates that Nader intended to seize Baghdad as a bargaining chip in exchange for the Caucasus but with Baghdad being such a strategic prize in itself it is rather doubtful any civil exchange of territory was held in mind at the time at all. Despite the unexpected choice of theatre the Ottomans in the region were well prepared to receive the Persians.

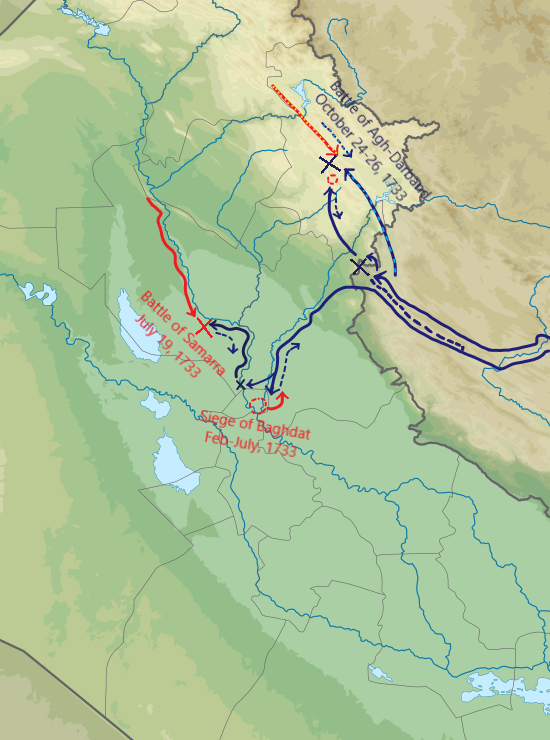
Nader's Mesopotamian Campaign

To achieve a modicum of surprise Nader decided upon a march through the mountains as opposed to a direct advance against the fortified border town of Zohab near Qasr-e Shirin. The mountain path was a difficult and snowy route to negotiate and some amongst the soldiers perished but Nader managed to get his 600 men to descend down into the valley behind the Ottoman battlements and without hesitation struck in the dead of night. Completely out-witted by Nader the garrison of Zohab woke up and fled their posts in terror. Nader ordered a new fort to be built and moved south to join the main Persian army that had left Hamadan and was heading to Baghdad.

== Crossing the Tigris ==
Besieging Kirkuk with a residue force of 7,000 the main Persian army marched on until they defeated an Ottoman army near Baghdad and then proceeded to encircle the city itself in preparation for a siege after a hard fought campaign of maneuver were Nader managed to cross the Tigris. Ahmad Pasha would prove a stubborn defender of the city and held out until the approach of a relief effort in the form of an army of 80,000 under Topal Pasha.

== Battle of Samara ==
In a cunning ruse Topal drew Nader into a disadvantageous battle where despite losing a quarter of his own men Topal inflicted a crushing defeat on the Persian army, half of which was destroyed and all its guns lost. This monumental victory allowed the lifting of the siege further to the south where Ahmad Pasha- having heard of Topal Osman's victory -came out with an enthusiastic garrison to chase away the 12,000 Persians left to maintain the blockade of Baghdad. This was Nader Shah's only defeat in the battlefield in his entire career.

== Battle of Kirkuk ==
Making an almost fantastical recovery from his seemingly irreplaceable losses Nader rebuilt his army in an incredibly short amount of time and invaded Ottoman Iraq once more. After some minor frontier skirmishing he sent Haji Beg Khan to lure out Topal Pasha which he succeeded in doing. The Ottoman advance guard was set upon drowned under the waves of a ferocious ambush after which Nader gathered his men and marched directly against the main Ottoman army nearby.

An intense musketry duel was kept up along the entire breadth of the line until Nader ordered his infantry to unsheathe their sabers and charge the Ottomans, supporting them with a pincer movement by his cavalry reserve which put Topal Osman's army in a cauldron of Persian troops. The Turks crumbling in the face of this manoeuvre found that not even the presence of the old fox in the person of Topal Pasha could rally them and fled leaving all their guns.

== Aftermath ==
Nader however could not pursue his impressive conquest due to a growing uprising in southern Persia, caused by Mohammed Khan Baloch, who was originally a general of Nader Shah, which required his immediate attention. Therefore, Baghdad was yet again saved from falling into Persian hands. The campaign itself did not decide the fate of the war but set the stage for Nader's Caucasus campaign in 1735 where through a shattering defeat of the Ottomans at Baghavard, Istanbul was brought to its knees.

== See also ==
- Topal Osman Pasha
- Ottoman–Persian War (1730–1735)

== Sources ==
- Moghtader, Gholam-Hussein(2008). The Great Batlles of Nader Shah, Donyaye Ketab
- Axworthy, Michael(2009). The Sword of Persia: Nader Shah, from tribal warrior to conquering tyrant, I. B. Tauris
- Ghafouri, Ali(2008). History of Iran's wars: from the Medes to now, Etela'at Publishing
