= Mosul vilayet =

First-level administrative division of the Ottoman Empire

Arabic: ولاية الموصل Ottoman Turkish: ولايت موصل Vilâyet-i Musul
- Vilayet of the Ottoman Empire
- 1878–1918
- Flag

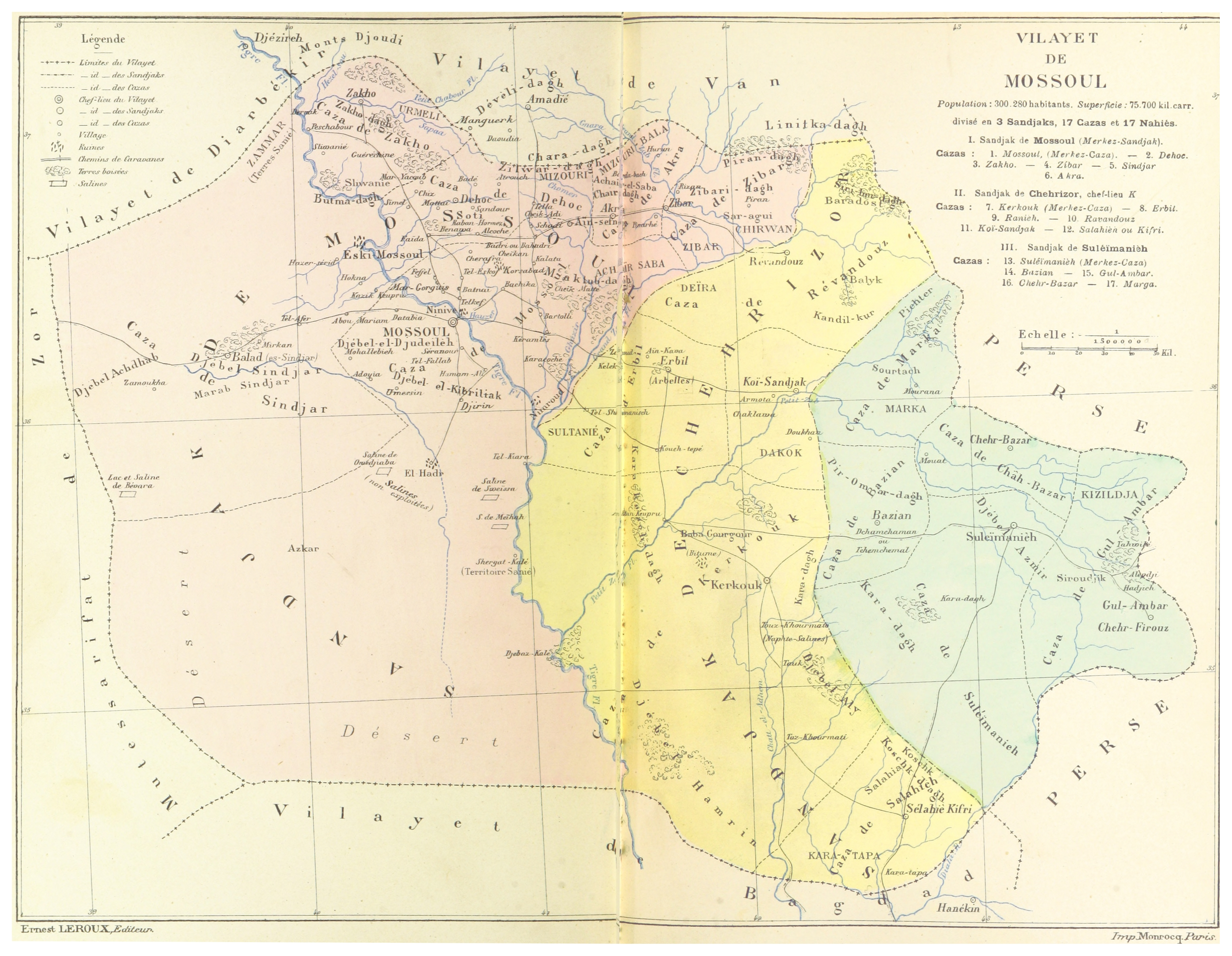
- The Mosul Vilayet in 1892
- Capital: Mosul
- Population
  - 1897: 475,415
- History
  - Established: 1878
  - Armistice of Mudros: 1918
Preceded by	Succeeded by
Baghdad Vilayet	Mandatory Iraq
- Today part of: Iraq

The Mosul Vilayet (Arabic: ولاية الموصل; Ottoman Turkish: ولايت موصل, romanized: Vilâyet-i Musul) was a first-level administrative division (vilayet) of the Ottoman Empire. It was created from the northern sanjaks of the Baghdad Vilayet in 1878. Mosul Vilayet was part of 'the Iraq Region' (Hıtta-i Irakiyye).

At the beginning of the 20th century, it reportedly had an area of 29,220 square miles (75,700 km^{2}), while the preliminary results of the first Ottoman census of 1885 (published in 1908) gave the population as 300,280. The accuracy of the population figures ranges from "approximate" to "merely conjectural" depending on the region from which they were gathered.

The city of Mosul and the area south to the Little Zab was allocated to France in the 1916 Sykes-Picot Agreement of the First World War, and later transferred to Mandatory Iraq following the Mosul Question.

== Administrative divisions ==
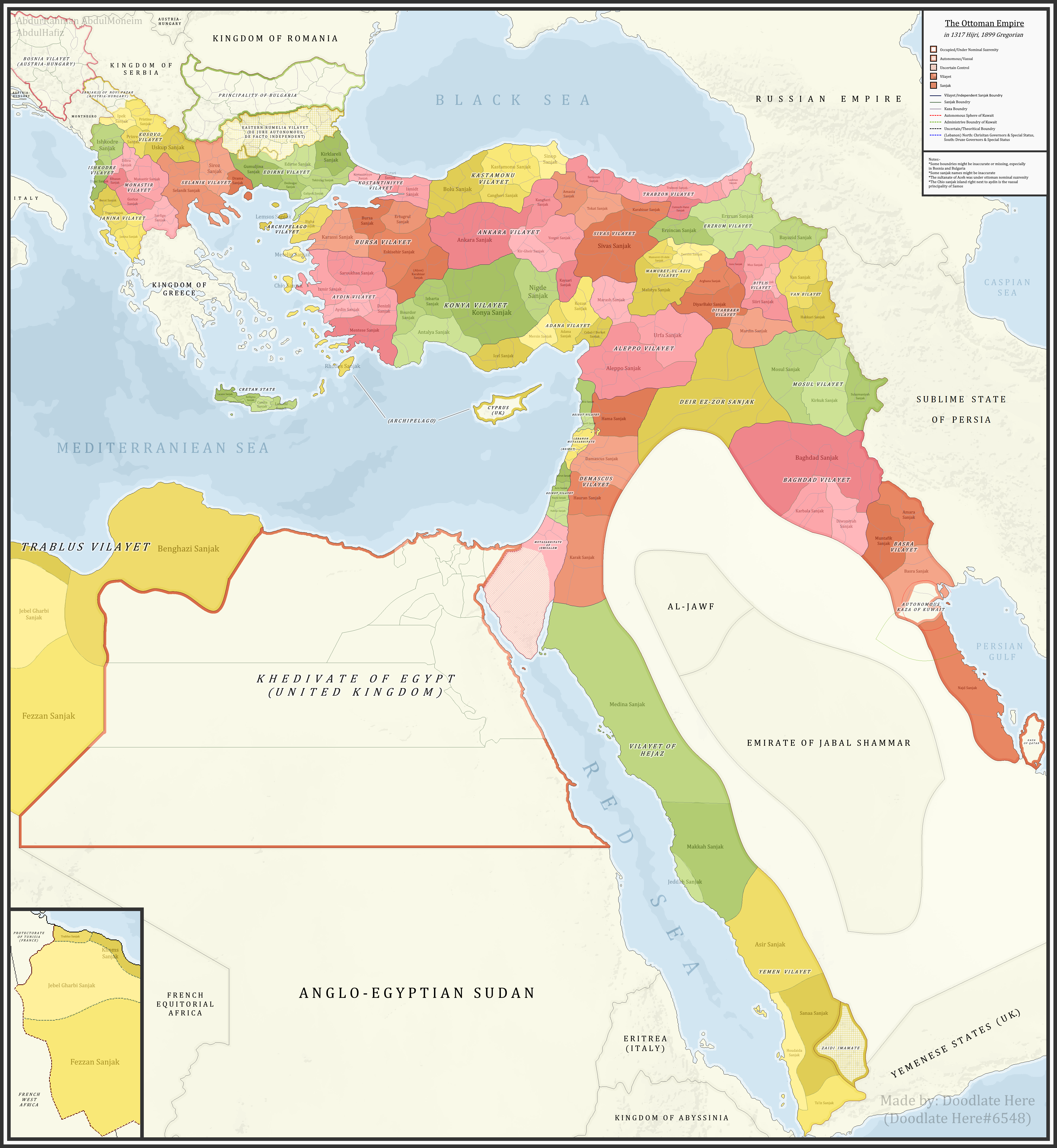
A map showing the administrative divisions of the Ottoman Empire in 1317 Hijri, 1899 Gregorian, Including the Vilayet of Mosul and its Sanjaks.

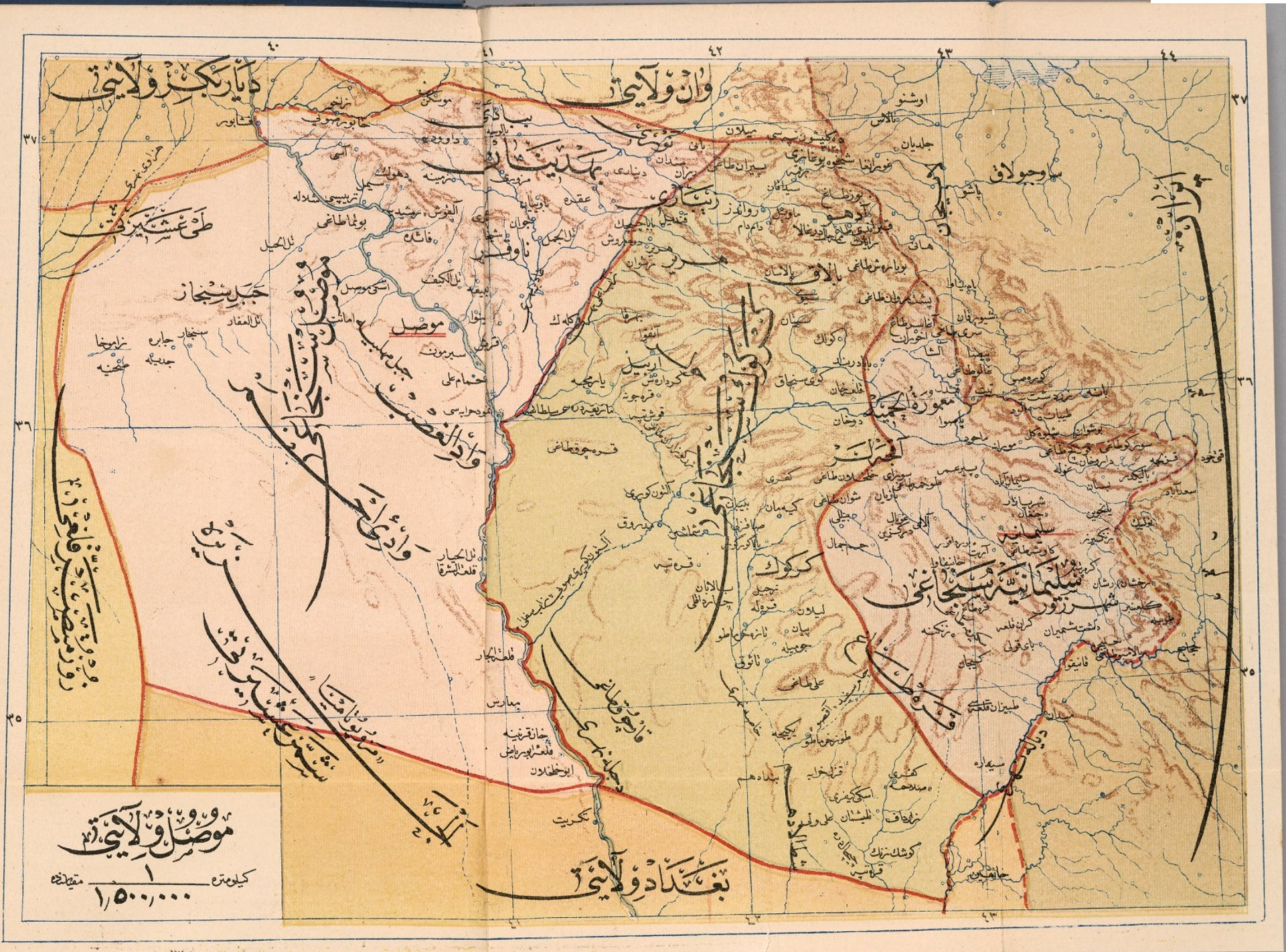
Map of subdivisions of Mosul Vilayet in 1907

In official Ottoman correspondence, the Mosul Vilayet was considered part of 'the Iraq region', a term that collectively referred to the provinces of Mosul, Baghdad, and Basra. Ottoman officials used this designation in administrative and military documents to emphasize the interconnected nature of these three provinces, which were regarded as forming the core of Ottoman Iraq. This regional framework, which predated the Sykes-Picot Agreement, reflected the Ottoman state's view of Iraq as a coherent and administratively linked zone within the empire. Initially subordinate to the Baghdad Vilayet, Mosul was separated and elevated to vilayet status in 1878, a change that weakened administrative cohesion in the region. The separation reflected broader Ottoman efforts to manage the security and tribal dynamics of Northern Mesopotamia, where frequent uprisings and external pressures from Qajar Persia and Britain made centralized control increasingly difficult.

Sanjaks of the vilayet and their capitals:

1. Sanjak of Mosul, Mosul
2. Sanjak of Shahrizor (later renamed Sanjak of Kirkuk), Kirkuk
3. Sanjak of Sulaymaniyah, Sulaymaniyah

== Demographics ==
According to early 20th-century British intelligence, the vilayet had a Kurdish majority and a Turkoman minority.

Enumeration by the Government of Iraq (1922-24).
	Number	Percentage
Kurds	520,007	64.9%
Arabs	166,914	20.8%
Christians	61,336	7.7%
Turks	38,652	4.8%
Yezidis	26,257	3.3%
Jews	11,897	1.5%
Total	801,000	100%

== See also ==
- Mosul Question
- Iraqi Kurdistan
- Kingdom of Kurdistan
