= Safavid Government Institutions =

- Author: Willem Floor
- Published: 2001 (Mazda Publishers)

Safavid Government Institutions is a book about the Safavid Empire, published by Mazda Publishers, with Willem Floor as author. It contains the first detailed account of the state and army institutions and offices of the Safavid Empire.
