= Coffeehouse culture of Baghdad =

Set of Baghdadi traditions in coffeehouses

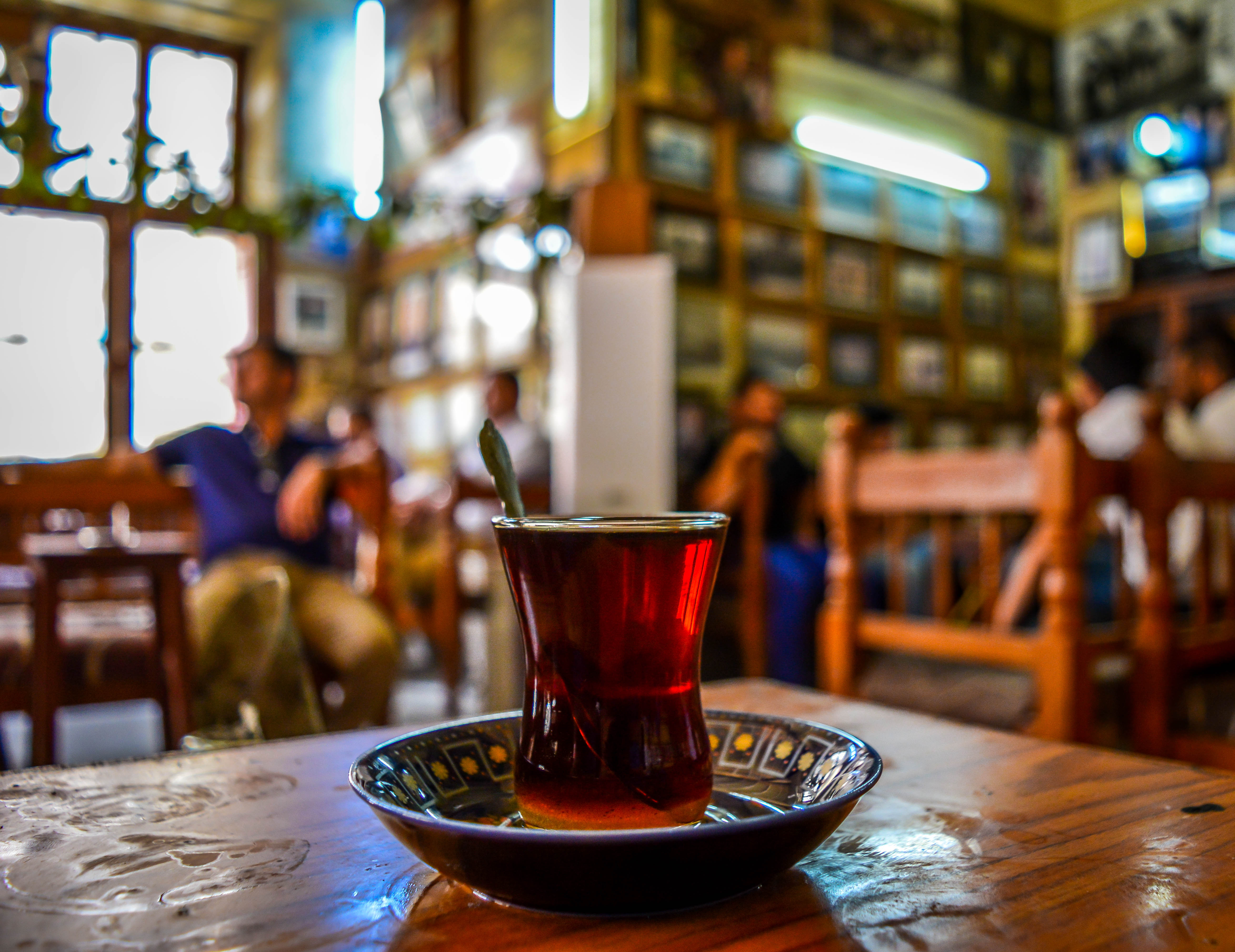
Iraqi chai as served in Shabandar Café

The coffeehouse culture of Baghdad (Arabic: ثقافة المقهي البغدادية) is a set of traditions and social behaviors in old, local, or traditional Baghdadi coffeehouses in Baghdad, Iraq. Ever since their inception in the 1500s, cafés have acted as social forums and gathering grounds for friends and meetings for all ages as well as a gathering ground for intellectuals, thinkers, and personalities to discuss politics, art, literature, science, poetry, and other subjects that had a great impact on Iraq's cultural and literary life while consuming tea or coffee.

Cultural Baghdadi coffeehouses have been thriving since their demands grew in the 17th century and continued into the 20th century, especially in al-Rashid Street, which saw many of these coffeehouses materialize along the street and in the city. The majority of those coffeehouses, which bear witness to cultural, social, and political changes that have marked Iraq's modern history, have since been closed. Although many heritage and new traditional coffeehouses are still open. The most popular of these is the Shabandar Café in al-Mutanabbi Street.

Even though the coffeehouse culture is mostly associated with and active in Baghdad, the culture is spread throughout Iraq and examples can be found such as in Sulaymaniyah, Erbil and Karbala.

== History ==
=== Ottoman Era (16th–19th centuries) ===
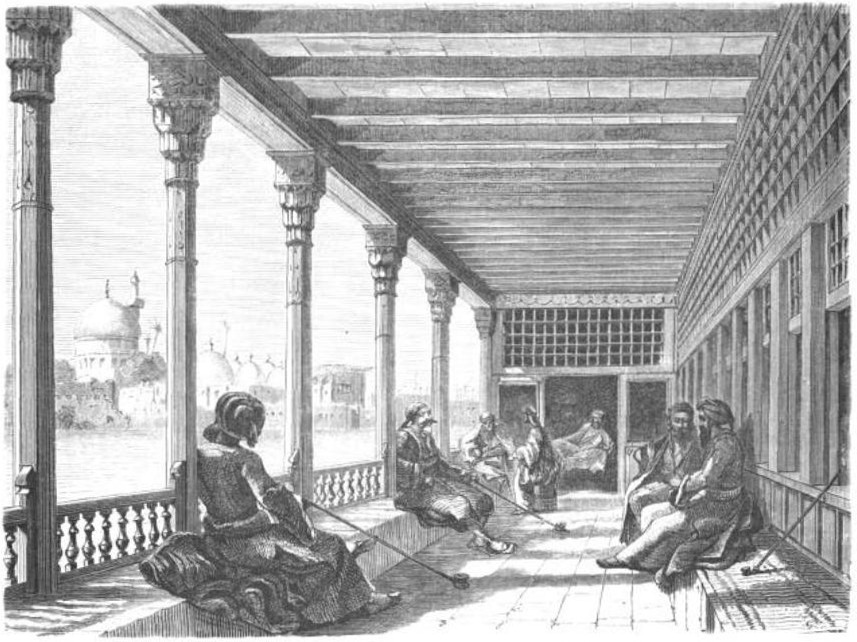
Illustration of the Hassan Pasha Café in Baghdad from the 1840s

According to Iraqi historians, the first Baghdadi coffeehouse was named "Khan Jahan" and was established in 1590 under Ottoman rule by Cığalazade Sinan Pasha for a man named "Ismail Effendi". This coffeehouse was located behind al-Mustansiriya Madrasa. From the 17th century to the mid-18th century, there was a high demand for coffeehouses in the neighborhoods of Baghdad, which is believed to be the origin of the culture surrounding these establishments. 1604 saw construction of the Hassan Pasha Café near al-Wazeer Mosque, which contributed to the spread and demands of coffeehouses.

Alongside mosques, the coffeehouse became a meeting space, especially a secular one, and a meeting ground for military officers and the civil rulers of Baghdad. By the end of the seventeenth century, there were ten coffeehouses in Baghdad, with five being located on al-Maidan Square, mostly due to trading and military services, while the rest were either located next to the banks of the Tigris river or the souks. It was also a recruitment space for various factional groups looking for followers or support.

Coffeehouses started to spread around the city and its outskirts. The number of coffeehouses in Baghdad reached 184, according to what was indicated by the Baghdad Code of 1882, and by 1903, the number had increased to 285. This increase called for competition between coffeehouse owners to win the largest number of customers, some owners turned to discotheques for the competition. What helped in this matter was the declaration of the Ottoman constitution in 1908 about giving relative freedoms to the religious and national communities of the states that were under the control of the Ottomans, and many of the restrictions imposed on the press were lifted. Coffeehouse competitors hired well-known Iraqi singers to play Iraqi maqam and reciters to attract customers, as well as storytellers and actors who put on fantasy shows. However, some coffeehouses developed their own performances, notably those around al-Maidan Square. Some owners went as far as hiring female dancers and singers from Egypt, and the Levant, and this recruitment was considered a shift in public social morals at the time. Some owners even altered the buildings' structures to accommodate a stage to be built. Coffeehouses also started to become crowded during the evening nights of Ramadan and games were played such as those that involved the traditional Iranian zurkhāneh.

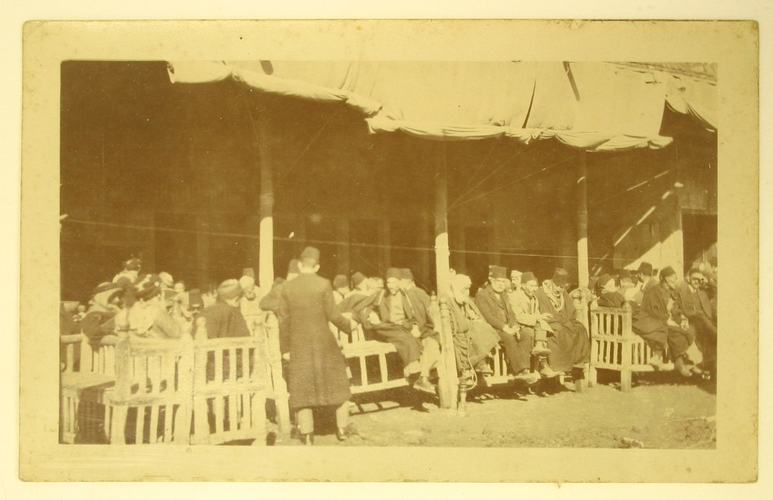
A street coffeehouse in Iraq during World War I

The main material offered by the coffeehouses was hot tea in addition to coffee. Some coffeehouses offered sweets and cold drinks. Seating places in Baghdadi coffeehouses consist of sofas called "Takhts" which were made of wood. As for hot tea, it is served by a mug which was named "al-Istikkan" by the locals of Baghdad, and the tools for making tea consisted of a teapot called "quri", and a hot water tank with a faucet.

European traveler James Silk Buckingham documented several of these coffeehouses during his visit to Baghdad in 1819, notably the Hassan Pasha Café and al-Beiruti Café, which caught his attention due to their lights that covered the Tigris River. Buckingham also documented that coffeehouses were so common that there were already two established coffeehouses next to one of the gates of Baghdad, and that they were usually crowded mostly at night.

=== Transformation post-independence of Iraq (1920s–1970s) ===
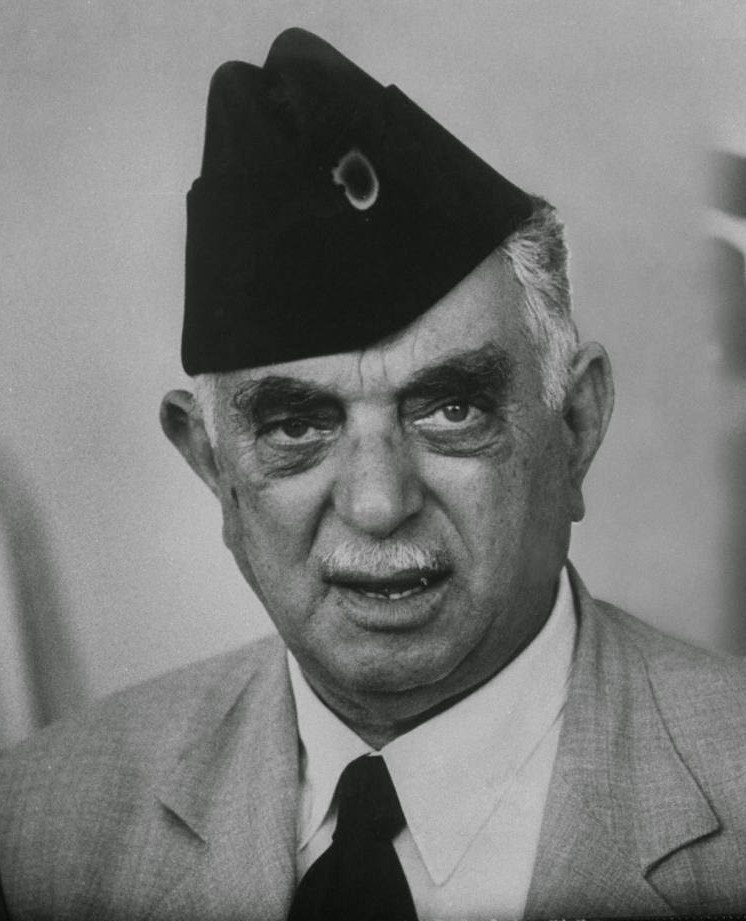
Nuri al-Said's portrait can be found in many Baghdadi coffeehouses even to this day.

During the Royal era of Iraq, coffeehouses became a phenomenon and a sign of political and literary transformation. They became places where the educated class and the pioneers of thought would sit and gather. The coffeehouse's entertainment function has shifted to artistic, poetic, political, and multi-directional intellectual meetings. Al-Rashid Street saw many of these coffeehouses such as al-Zahawi Café which was named in honor of Iraqi Poet al-Zahawi after former-Iraqi Prime Minister Nuri al-Said invited him to a meeting in it due to lack of respectable places in that period.

In the mid-1940s, al-Rashid Street witnessed the emergence of two new coffeehouses with unfamiliar styles to Iraqis at the time. The Brazilian Café and the Swiss Café featured European facades, thick luxurious glass, and elegant tables made of bamboo sticks, in addition to chairs specially imported from Europe and coffee machines that operated on electricity. Such coffeehouses have never been seen before in Iraq and were breathtaking at the time. Artists like Jawad Saleem and Faeq Hassan, who studied in Europe, would visit these Western-style coffeehouses, as at the time, Iraqis were much more open to foreign cultures. The coffeehouse also contributed to the idea of establishing the Union of Iraqi Writers. Al-Tahrir Square also saw another Western-style café, the Kit Kat Café. The Kit Kat café's visitors were Westernized intellectuals and liberal-leaning, and it was common to find Marxist talk in the coffeehouse.

By then, the coffeehouse culture had become an integral part of Baghdad's people, and a typical Iraqi environment that included all directions, ideas, and currents, along with conflicts and rivalries erupting, especially during Friday mornings and afternoons. Supporters of various poets also used to pick cafés to inhabit. Although the pioneers of the more modern and Westernized cafes did not appreciate the traditional coffeehouses that were widely spread throughout the city at the time, they were closely related to their fellow writers and artists, despite their differing intellectual visions and affiliations. Political differences of opinion and viewpoints have never divided the people of Baghdad as a whole.

==== Role in Iraqi poetry ====
The 1940s witnessed a significant revival in Iraqi literature and poetry, particularly due to the poetry, fiction, and critiques written by young college students. Young poets would establish connections and gatherings, and were collectivized with each other to develop a sense of familiarity, which was unique for Iraq at the time. Coffeehouses became a venue for these meetings and were adapted as a sort of headquarters, as they provided the space needed to discuss their work and interests. Coffeehouses have historically housed poets such as the big three neo-classical Iraqi poets al-Zahawi, al-Rusafi, and al-Jawahiri, whose reputations were already established, so this movement was seen as a continuation of tradition. Open criticism and opinion discussions were also widespread, indicating the poets' and writers' exposure to improvement. These gatherings especially grew after coffeehouses started to expand in the 1950s. Due to the younger poets having little to no connections or establishments as poets, the coffeehouse was seen as a way to develop these, as well as a sort of "workshop" to develop one's skills. Although some poets suffered, such as poet Hussein Mardan, whose poems titled "Naked Poems" led to his arrest by the police.

Hussein Mardan confirmed in his writings the role of the coffeehouse in the development of that generation's work, as well as the association of different coffeehouses with different poets. For instance, the Hasan Ajami Café, located on al-Rashid Street, was associated with al-Jawahiri due to the café being his favorite, and the literary circles in Baghdad, including Mardan himself, where he noted that younger poets would meet with older poets to receive encouragement and advice. Coffeehouses were also used to write political poems to support demonstrations, such as al-Rusafi in the Arif Agha Café in the 1930s, or al-Jawahiri with the Parliament Café and the Hasan Ajami Café during the Wathbah uprisings of 1948.

Furthermore, Jewish academic Sasson Somekh confirmed in his book Baghdad, Yesterday: The Making of an Arab Jew that he began his work after meeting Poet al-Jawahiri in the Hassan Ajami Café, which was located next to the Jewish Shamash School where Sasson used to attend when he was young. He wrote:

I spent my days running back and forth between the many cafes on al-Rashid Street, which were the gathering places of young writers and artists - most of them Muslim, secular, left-wing, and all of them several years older than I was. A world of culture opened before me. Baghdad in the late 1940s was humming with literary activity and seemed poised to become the center of literature in the Arab world.

However, not all poets were welcoming. An example of this can be found in al-Zahawi Cafe, which gained notoriety for its "literary battles" between al-Zahawi and al-Rusafi due to heated discussions that continued until al-Rusafi died in 1945. In al-Beiruti Café, traditionalist poets and writers would gather to preserve Iraqi neo-classical styles and their work. As such, they suspected the work of al-Haydari, a young poet who started to visit the coffeehouse after al-Rusafi's death, was considered a "Western plot against the Arabic literary heritage."

=== In modern times (1980s–2018) ===
During the 1990s, some coffeehouses sought to attract young customers by providing billiard table, which proved to be a major success in attracting new customers. However, this new shift was viewed with disapproval by the older generations.

After the US-led invasion of Iraq, new cafés witnessed a new shift with huge sums of money being spent on their preparation, and cakes, refreshments, and juices were served in a lavish way. New café owners relied on specialists in their manufacture. These new cafés were more commercial in nature than older cafés and appeared in areas such as al-Mansour, Zayouna, and Karrada. The rise of westernization and globalization in Iraq after the invasion also lead to the decrease of many of the traditional coffeehouses around the cities along with decreasing rate of customers. Many of the remaining cafés such as al-Zahawi Café and Hassan Ajami Café are now suffering from neglect. A lot of the closed coffeehouses have also been turned into commercial stores.

Newer coffeehouses have also become a large concern for many Iraqis after the discovery of illegal activities such as being centers for criminal gangs, drug trafficking, human organ trafficking, prostitution, and more. The proliferation of these cafés in residential neighborhoods raised concern among families and neighborhoods and many residents noted the immoral activities but were afraid to report to the authorities out of fear of reprisals or prosecution. As of 2018, more than 60 cafés that were reported to have such activities were closed by the Iraqi authorities. Some of the cafés were even unlicensed.

Despite this, there are many efforts and projects done by Iraqis to preserve heritage coffeehouses. Entertainment and friend gatherings have become the main activities of coffeehouses recently and it was noted that younger generations prefer the heritage coffeehouses for their cheaper prices and more unique atmosphere compared to the newer cafés.

The US occupation also caused many Iraqi competencies such as physicists, mathematicians, atomic energy scientists, doctors, university professors, senior staff officers in the army, or experts in military industrialization, to flee to Syria and Jordan to escape the harsh conditions that came after the invasion. Many of them were forced to retire due to conditions and the limited chances of ever returning to Iraq. Coffeehouses in Syria and Jordan, specifically Damascus and Amman, became meeting areas for these Iraqi experts due to their sense of isolation and limited opportunities they faced.

== Types of Baghdadi coffeehouses ==
Cafés found in Baghdad are usually divided into several categories, the most notable are:

1. Passers-by coffeehouses: Usually located on main streets and squares, they are made for relaxation for locals passing by.
2. Locality coffeehouses: These coffeehouses are located within neighborhoods and act as meeting places for people living in said neighborhoods.
3. Intellectual coffeehouses: These coffeehouses are gathering grounds for intellectuals, artists, and poets and are found on al-Mutanabbi Street.
4. Athletes coffeehouses: These coffeehouses are dedicated to football players.
5. Working Class coffeehouses: As the name suggests, these coffeehouses are made for the working class and can be found all over Baghdad.

There are many well-known coffeehouses around Baghdad. Due to their important role as centers of daily life, many coffeehouses hold a nostalgic significance for Iraqis, and many of them have been documented as havens for prominent poets, writers, thinkers, scholars, merchants, and other legal personalities who have been associated with these establishments. Coffeehouses of Baghdad are usually divided into two parts in terms of locations, the Western side and the Eastern side cafés. However, most cafés are located on the Eastern side.

== Notable coffeehouses on the western side ==
=== Al-Karkh district ===
==== Akama Café ====
Al-Akama Café (Arabic: مقهى العكامة) was an old coffeehouse that overlooked the Tigris River directly. Named after the old profession of al-Akam, the café was founded by a man named Hassoun al-Qahwaji, who was known for his kindness, which is what gained the café its fame and its nickname "Hassoun Café". The café is divided into two parts: the large rooms at the beginning, which are the public rooms, and the small rooms at the end. It had four palm trees and a few oleander trees. It was frequented by writers and dignitaries from the people of Karkh. Abdullah al-Qassab, the former Iraqi Minister of Interior, was one of its patrons.

==== Al-Beiruti Café ====
Al-Beiruti Café (Arabic: مقهى البيروتي) is one of the oldest surviving resting stations and heritage coffeehouses in Baghdad, dating to the 17th century. Located on the sides of the Tigris River, it contains a floating hall and is active in the evenings. People of all ages visited the coffeehouse for entertainment, and it served as a small forum where issues related to economic, political, and other affairs were discussed regularly. In the spring of 1954, the levels of the Tigris rose due to the abundance of rain, resulting in the flooding of Baghdad and the sinking of the original coffeehouse. In 1978, the government rebuilt and reopened the coffeehouse. Currently, it still operates and has also expanded to include a floating hall.

==== Dar al-Atraqchi ====
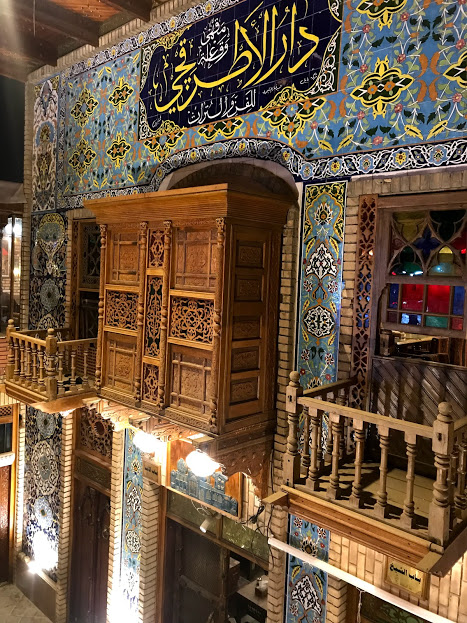
Dar al-Atraqchi Café

Dar al-Atraqchi Café (Arabic: مقهى الأطرقجي) is a newer coffeehouse that replicates older Baghdadi coffeehouses. Opening in 2013, the coffeehouse contains hundreds of rare Baghdadi and heritage antiques as well as traditional walls, carpets, and furniture. Among its antiques are handmade carpets, ancient fines, antiques, a replica of the obelisk of Hammurabi, the Sumerian harp, silverware, and many more. The work companion of the owner, Sa'ad Salloum Abu Samer, confirmed that the reason for the demand for frequenting the coffeehousewhile it serves tea, coffee and shisha is that they are tired of modernity, western decorations, and bright lights, and have resorted to the calm atmosphere that the place provides them, as well as the old Baghdadi atmosphere.

Dar al-Atraqchi also lacks a table numbering system; instead, it has been replaced by naming each table after one of Iraq's artistic, literary, and political figures and pioneers. Among those figures are Ali al-Wardi, Badr Shakir al-Sayyab, Abd al-Razzaq al-Hasani, and many more. The coffeehouse offers its patrons singing performances every evening that include maqam and traditional songs.

==== Mazhar Café ====
Mazhar Café (Arabic: مقهى مزهر) is a heritage coffeehouse located in the Karkh district near Haifa Street and the Ministry of Culture, and it has three entrance doors. The café is usually associated with Muhammad al-Qubanchi, whose pictures are hung on the walls of the coffeehouse, and it was a popular destination for talking about horse racing in al-Mansour district and betting on horse riders, as the owner of the café was a horse racing fan himself.

=== Al-Kadhimiyya district ===
==== Hajj Sadiq Café ====
Hajj Sadiq Café (Arabic: مقهى الحاج صادق) was an old coffeehouse located in Kadhimiya. The coffeehouse is notable for being the first to introduce television during the Hashemite period prior to televisions becoming widespread among all social classes. It was also a meeting spot for merchants and lawyers. During the morning on the day of the 14 July Revolution that overthrew the Hashemite dynasty in Iraq, the owner of the coffeehouse, Hajj Sadiq, ran to the rooftop of his house near the coffeehouse with binoculars to witness the bombing of several ministries, and an unknown gunman shot him. The coffeehouse remained open in his memory until it was closed after 2003.

==== Star Café ====
Star Café (Arabic: مقهى نجم) is a meeting place for the writers, artists, and dignitaries from the Kadhimiyya district and is located on the entrance of Sharif al-Radi Street.

==== Al-Turath al-Sha'bi Café ====
Al-Turath al-Sha'bi Café (Arabic: مقهى التراث الشعبي) is an old coffeehouse located in Kadhimiya. One of the oldest surviving coffeehouses, it is distinguished by outstanding heritage pictures, including a rare painting by the painter Ibrahim al-Naqqash representing the old Baghdad architecture and shanasheel, in addition to the presence of old samovars, on one of which was written the date of 1909. During Ramadan, the Baghdadi game of al-Muhaibis is held, which is organized by Jassem al-Aswad, the player of al-Muhaibis. The coffeehouse has also become a meeting place for sellers of rings, precious stones, and rosaries due to its proximity to their market.

== Notable coffeehouses in the eastern side ==
=== Al-A'dhamiyya district ===
==== Ibrahim Arab Café ====
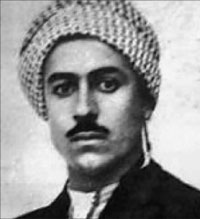
Ibrahim Arab

Ibrahim Arab Café (Arabic: مقهى إبراهيم عرب) was an old coffeehouse that existed in the Royal era in the A'dhamiyya district. The coffeehouse was not famous in its own right but for the fame of its owner, Ibrahim Arab, who was a Baghdadi social figure renowned for creating fictional over-the-top stories that he attributed to himself, which he told to visitors who gathered around him in the coffeehouse. Such stories include how he ate most days of the week with King Faisal I, the time Adolf Hitler invited him on a tour around Germany, that time he almost destroyed Baghdad by pulling the Eastern side with a hook while fishing on the Tigris River, the time he and a drunk Nuri al-Said had lunch together and that the captain of the nobles of Baghdad did not enjoy his dinner except with Ibrahim's company. The visitors would also encourage Ibrahim to make more stories.

==== Al-Nu'man Café ====
Al-Nu'man Café (Arabic: مقهى النعمان) is a coffeehouse located in al-A'dhamiyya District and was owned by Nu'man Thabet. During the beginning of the US-led invasion of Iraq, former Iraqi President Saddam Hussein took a final public tour around Baghdad. During this tour, he visited the coffeehouse that gave it its fame, leading many customers to visit it and discuss the latest news at the time.

=== Al-Rusafa district ===
==== 14th of July Café ====
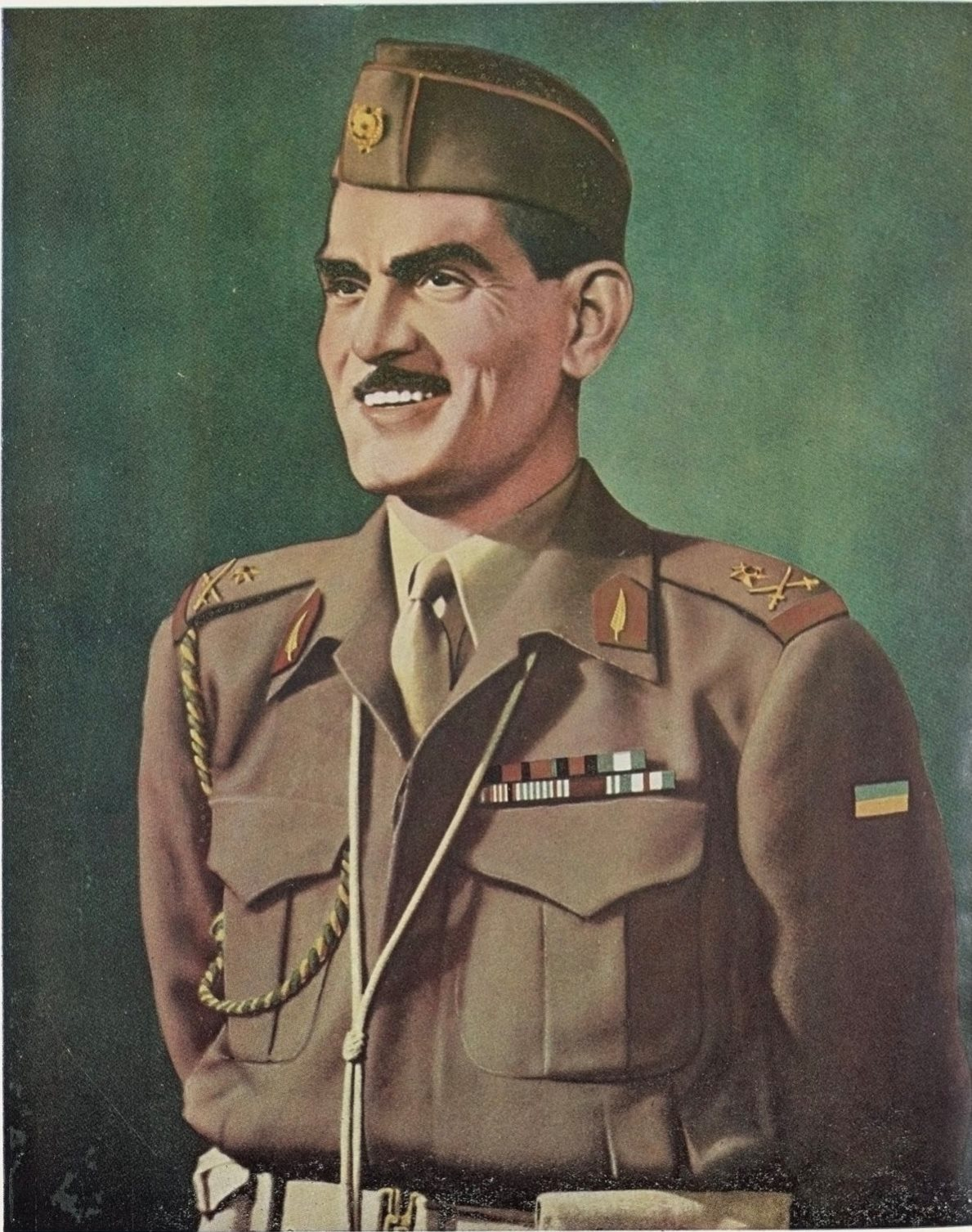
Abd al-Karim Qasim's portrait was spread throughout Baghdadi coffeehouses after the 14 July Revolution.

The 14 July Café (Arabic: مقهى ١٤ تموز) was a coffeehouse that existed on al-Kifah Street, then called King Ghazi Street. The coffeehouse was opened by the Iraqi Communist Party as part of a campaign to open coffeehouses around Baghdad to spread its influence. The coffeehouse was established in front of the Anjar Café, on the other side of al-Kifah Street. The coffeehouse's walls were decorated with banners that glorified Abd al-Karim Qasim and had slogans that said "Long live the sole leader, Abd al-Karim Qasim" and "Long live the democratic leader Abd al-Karim Qasim" along with framed pictures of Karl Marx, Friedrich Engels, Vladimir Lenin and Joseph Stalin. The influence of the communist party started to decline in the street after the leader of the Latin Cathedral of St. Joseph made a speech in which he described communists as "anarchists." Eventually, the coffeehouse stopped letting in patrons with communist ideas, which led to its closure.

==== Arif Agha Café ====
The Arif Agha Café (Arabic: مقهى عارف آغا) was an old, well-known coffeehouse that existed on al-Rashid Street, located opposite al-Zahawi Café and near the Haydar-Khana Mosque. The coffeehouse used to be frequented by senior employees of governmental departments, such as Yasin al-Hashemi and Hikmat Sulayman, as well as notables, such as al-Rusafi, and major merchants. It also became a private school during the summer, where high schoolers met with teachers and received assistance in private lessons, in preparation for taking the baccalaureate exams.

==== Anjar Café ====
Anjar Café (Arabic: مقهى عنجر) is one of the oldest coffeehouses located on al-Kifah Street. The coffeehouse serves Baghdadi breakfast along with kebab. Hashemite Iraqi premier Nuri al-Said reportedly ate this breakfast meal on Friday morning at Anjar Café. After the 14 July revolution, the coffeehouse became home to nationalist, Ba'athist and Islamic movements along with anti-communist sentiment and pictures of former Egyptian President Gamal Abdel-Nasser hung on its walls. Since the 14th of July Café was established in front of the coffeehouse after the revolution, the conflict between the patrons of the two coffeehouses was characterized by an "unusual pattern for the people of the area." For example, the patrons of the Anjar Café were preparing some young men to be hostile to the patrons of the 14th of July Café. The two conflicting groups naturally engaged in aggressive discussions, clashes, and fights, with the Islamic supporters raising Islamic slogans to spit at the communists.

==== Azawi Café ====
Azawi Café (Arabic: كهوة عزاوي) is one of the oldest and most popular coffeehouses of Baghdad, located in al-Maidan Square near Mosque-Madrasa of al-Ahmadiyya. Founded by Hameed al-Qaisi, the coffeehouse was distinguished by its celebrations and reviving the nights of Ramadan, and it was a place for popular games that are based on insight and meditation, the most famous of which is al-Muhaibis. The coffeehouse is also famous for its folk music that Iraqis still listen to to this day, and it was frequented by singers, artists, and poets. The coffeehouse is also associated with Iraqi maqam master Yousuf Omar's songs, as the coffeehouse is mentioned in his songs.

==== Brazilian Café ====
The Brazilian Café (Arabic: مقهى البرازيلية) was one of the most famous and oldest coffeehouses in Baghdad, located in the neighborhood of al-Muraba'a towards the eastern door near the Broadway Cinema. Opened in 1937, the café served steamed Brazilian coffee from a unique cauldron for preparing coffee imported from outside. It was a suitable place to see the latest news of politics, literature, and culture, and to read the newspapers and magazines provided by the café. In this coffeehouse, Jawad Seleem wrote in his memoirs after meeting Polish artists, where he said "Now I know color, now I know drawing."

After the Iraq War, the Brazilian Café closed and its building was converted into a commercial store selling fabrics.

==== Hasan Ajami Café ====
Hasan Ajami Café (Arabic: مقهى حسن عجمي) is an old coffeehouse that dates back to 1917 and is located on al-Rashid Street, opposite the Haydar-Khana Mosque. It was distinguished by its rare Russian samovars, decorated with pictures of Russian tsars and official seals dating back to the 19th century, along with teapots and hookah glasses, which were decorated with pictures of King Faisal I, King Ghazi and the Persian kings of the Qajars.

==== Hassan Pasha Café ====
Hassan Pasha Café (Arabic: مقهى حسن باشا) was one of the oldest recorded coffeehouses in Baghdad, built, in 1604. Located near al-Wazeer Mosque, it played a role in the rise of coffeehouses in Baghdad. It was recorded by James Silk Buckingham during his visit to Baghdad in 1819.

==== Al-Jamali Café ====
Al-Jamali Café (Arabic: مقهى الجمالي) was a famous coffeehouse located in Bab al-Sheikh and possibly named after Muhammad Fadhel al-Jamali.

==== Khalil Café ====
Khalil Café (Arabic: مقهى خليل) was an old coffeehouse that opened in 1931 and was located on al-Rashid Street in front of al-Mutanabbi Street and close to the Haydar-Khana Mosque. The coffeehouse was a meeting ground for intellectuals, senior officials, military personnel, merchants, sheikhs, and Islamic scholars, and its owner, Hajj Khalil al-Qahwati, was a personal friend with many of its visitors who were also allowed to stay in the café overnight due to the owner's valuing hospitality. The Khalil Café was witness to many social and political events during its existence due to its location on al-Rashid Street, such as demonstrations, royal motorcades, the coronation of King Faisal II, and the events of the 1958 coup, until it was closed and demolished in 1970. The café was also notable for appearing in the 1955 Iraqi film Saeed Effendi along with its owner.

==== Kit Kat Café ====
The Kit-Kat Café (Arabic: مقهى الكيت كات) is a coffeehouse located in al-Tahrir Square near al-Nahda Library. Designed in English architecture, the patrons of the café were mostly Westernized intellectuals, enlightened journalists, and liberal politicians with Marxist, revolutionary, and nationalist ideas. The café used to offer its customers French sweets, soft drinks, soda water, and soda. It's very rare to see tea and its customary cups on the table of its patrons. Teapots and oriental samovars were later replaced by refreshment machines and cappuccino and Nescafé machines. The café also imported European newspapers from companies such as Le Monde.

==== Al-Mu'aqaddin Café ====
Al-Mu'aqaddin Café (Arabic: مقهى المعقدين) is a coffeehouse located at the beginning of al-Sa'doun Street in central Baghdad. The coffeehouse hosted a constellation of writers renowned for their rebellious nature against the prevailing cultural scene. The patrons of the café preferred the more modern trends in world literature, such as poor theater, and westernization, in addition to what their discussions witnessed.

==== Parliament Café ====
The Parliament Café (Arabic: مقهى البرلمان) was an old coffeehouse opened in the mid-1940s by the Hajj Hussein Fakhr al-Din on al-Rashid Street. The café was a gathering spot for deputies, sheikhs, merchants, writers, and left-leaning politicians coming from Najaf. It is said that it is related to the fact that the majority of its patrons were members of the Iraqi Parliament. Among its patrons was al-Jawahiri, who recited poetry at the coffeehouse.

The Parliament Café no longer exists and was transformed into a restaurant.

==== Ridha Alwan Coffee ====
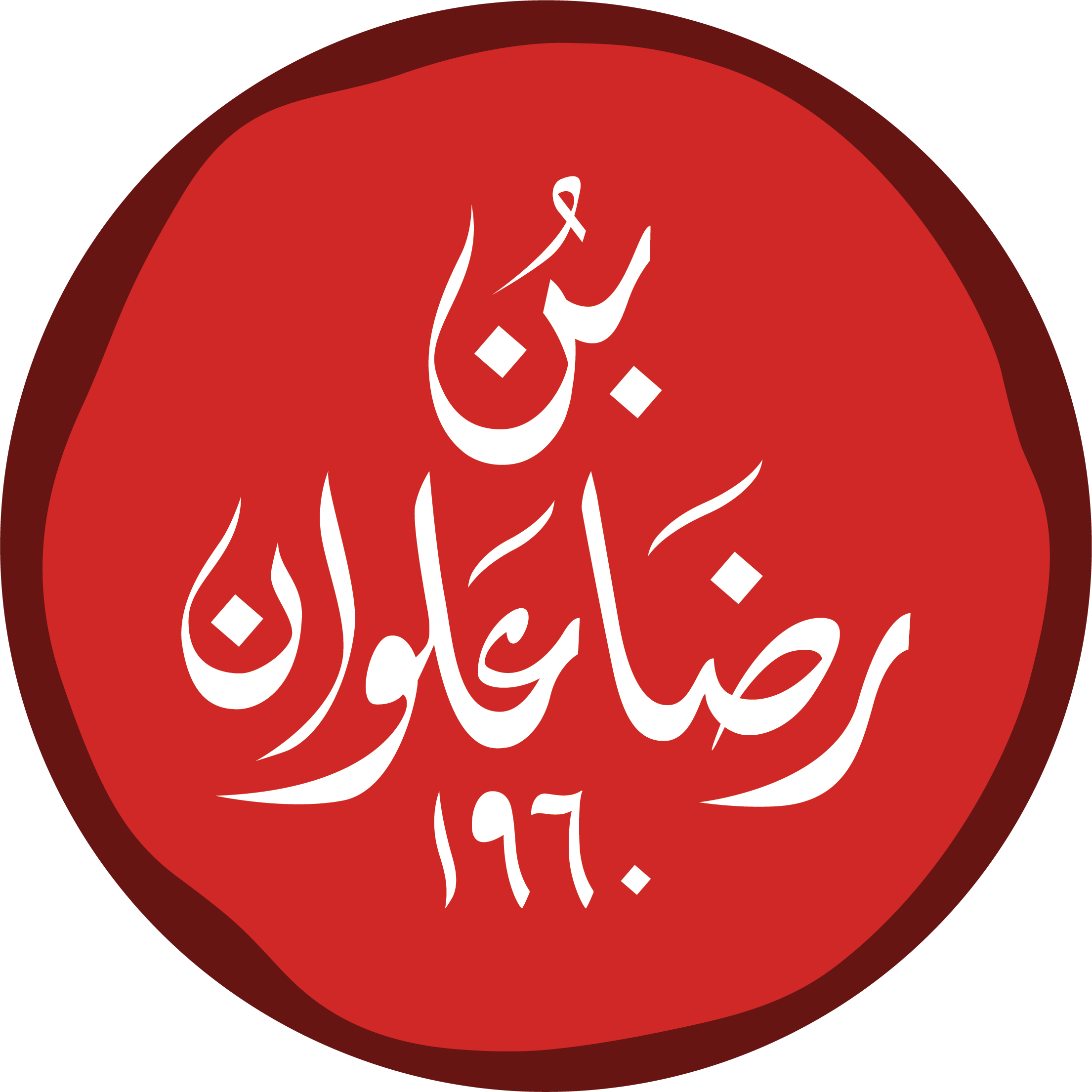
Ridha Alwan Coffee's official logo

Ridha Alwan Coffee (Arabic: مقهى رضا علوان) is one of the most famous cultural coffeehouses in Baghdad. It was established in 1960 as a coffee shop and is located in eastern Karrada. It used to be a small shop selling various coffees, but it developed into a large, elegant coffeehouse where people and families could distract themselves from the current political crisis and problems that afflict Iraq. The coffeehouse also holds cultural activities that bring together intellectuals, poets, and writers in poetry evenings and film festivals. Theater plays are also held during Ramadan in the coffeehouse.

The coffeehouses' distinguishing characteristics are the absence of hookahs, the prohibition of smoking, and the lack of TVs and song broadcasting. This makes coffeehouses quieter and smoke-free places for talks as well as a cultural and literary meeting place. The unique nature of the coffeehouse has won the approval of most customers who have visited them.

==== Shabandar Café ====
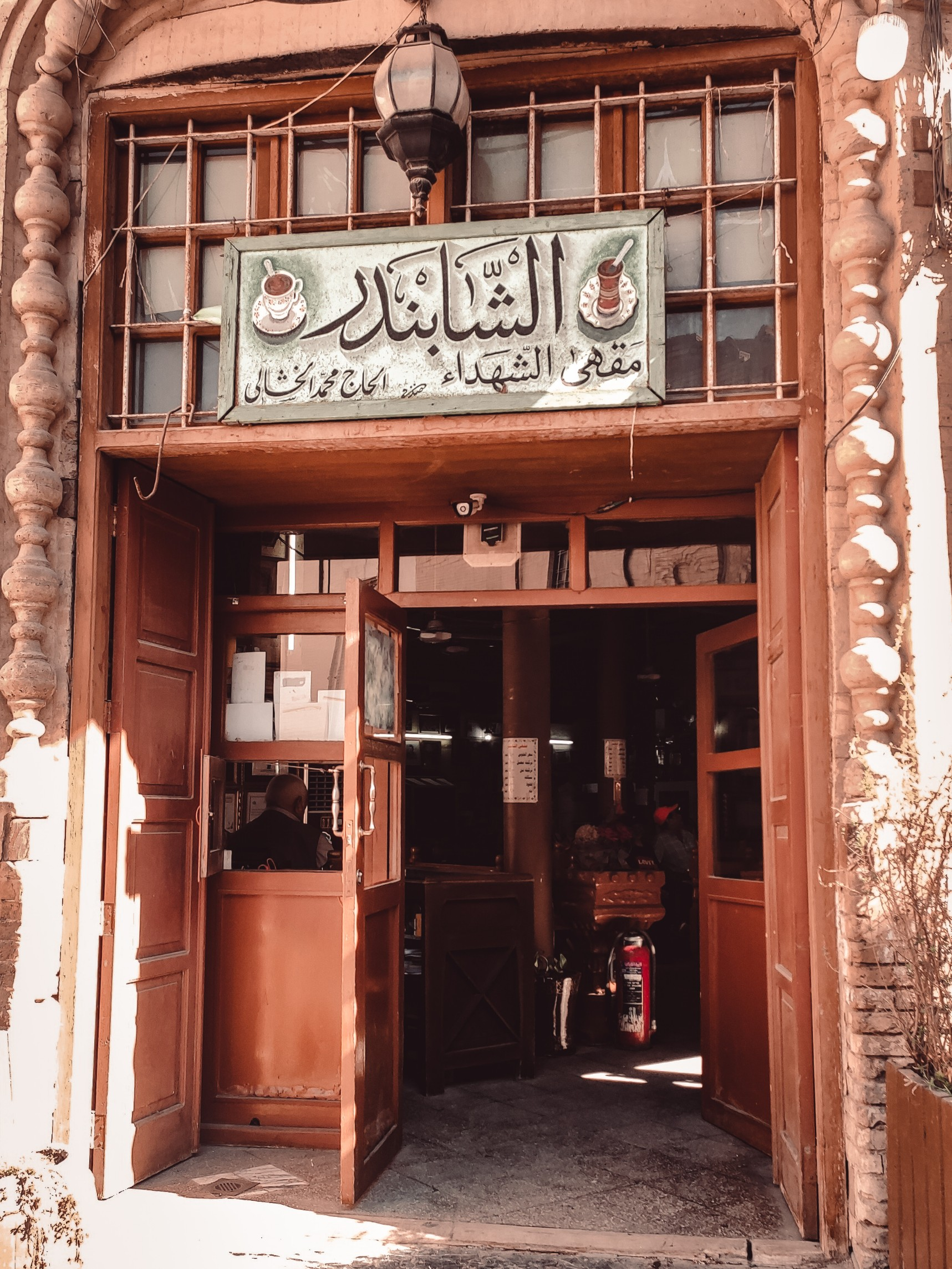
Shabandar Café's entrance, 2020

Shabandar Café (Arabic: مقهى الشابندر) is the most well-known of Baghdad's heritage coffeehouses, dating back to 1917. Located on al-Mutanabbi Street, Shabandar Café has been a main attraction for writers, poets, politicians, and book lovers, and was a starting point for demonstrations against British colonialism. The walls of the coffeehouse are adorned with old pictures of Iraqi society, and according to its current owner, Muhammad al-Khashali, they represent Iraq's rich heritage.

The coffeehouse also has another name, The Martyrs' Café. This was due to an incident in March 2007, during the sectarian violence after the US-led invasion of Iraq, in which a car exploded in al-Mutanabbi Street. The explosion burned down the coffeehouse along with other shops nearby and resulted in the loss of 68 victims, including four of al-Khashali's sons and one grandson. The coffeehouse was rebuilt, with funding from the state, merchants, and customers. To this day, the coffeehouse continues to attract artists, writers, poets, merchants, and intellectuals, and still maintains its external appearance.

==== Swiss Café ====
The Swiss Café (Arabic: مقهى السويسرية) is one of Baghdad's historic and distinctive coffeehouses, established in the mid-1940s. The coffeehouse had an unusual style for the people of Baghdad with its dazzling façade, luxurious thick glass, and elegant tables made of bamboo sticks, in addition to the comfortable chairs specially imported from Europe. It also had a playground for killing time. The coffeehouse imported newspapers from Europe, and its writers used to mix Arabic literature with Western literature at the time.

==== Umm Kulthum Café ====
Umm Kulthum Café (Arabic: مقهى ام كلثوم) is a preserved Heritage coffeehouse located on al-Rashid Street. The coffeehouse is dedicated to the Egyptian singer Umm Kulthum and it's a meeting ground for her fans to discuss and listen to her songs. Due to the huge legacy that she left behind in Baghdad during his visits, many coffeehouses themed after her were opened with the same name by her fans. Although, reportedly, only one remains today. The coffeehouse is also significant due to its association with nostalgia of old Baghdadi society.

==== Al-Zahawi Café ====
Al-Zahawi Café (Arabic: مقهى الزهاوي) is a preserved Heritage coffeehouse located near al-Mutanabbi Street. The coffeehouse's name comes from the Iraqi poet and philosopher Jamil Sidqi Al-Zahawi, who was one of the patrons of the coffeehouse, and the reason why it gained fame with its original name being "al-Amin Café" before it was changed after al-Zahawi died in 1936. Soon, the coffeehouse became a forum for writers and thinkers and was even visited by the Bengali poet and philosopher Rabindranath Tagore. The coffeehouse was damaged during the 2003 US-led invasion of Iraq, but was quickly rebuilt.

== Cultural references ==
The comic book series Tales of the Teen Titans published by DC Comics features a story (issue 52, "Jericho's story") that depicts the Teen Titans member Jericho going to the fictional Middle Eastern nation of Qurac (inspired by Iraq) and visiting the Arabian-style coffeehouse "Café Island" to gain information about Quraci leader Hurrambi Marlo.

== See also ==
- Arab cuisine
- Coffee culture
- Coffee in world cultures
- Coffeehouses in Arabic culture
- Culture of Iraq
- English coffeehouses in the 17th and 18th centuries
- History of Baghdad
- History of Iraq
- Iraqi cuisine
- Kurdish coffee
- Tea culture
- Middle Eastern cuisine
