= Al-Beiruti Café =

Café in Baghdad, Iraq

Al-Beiruti Café مقهى البيروتي
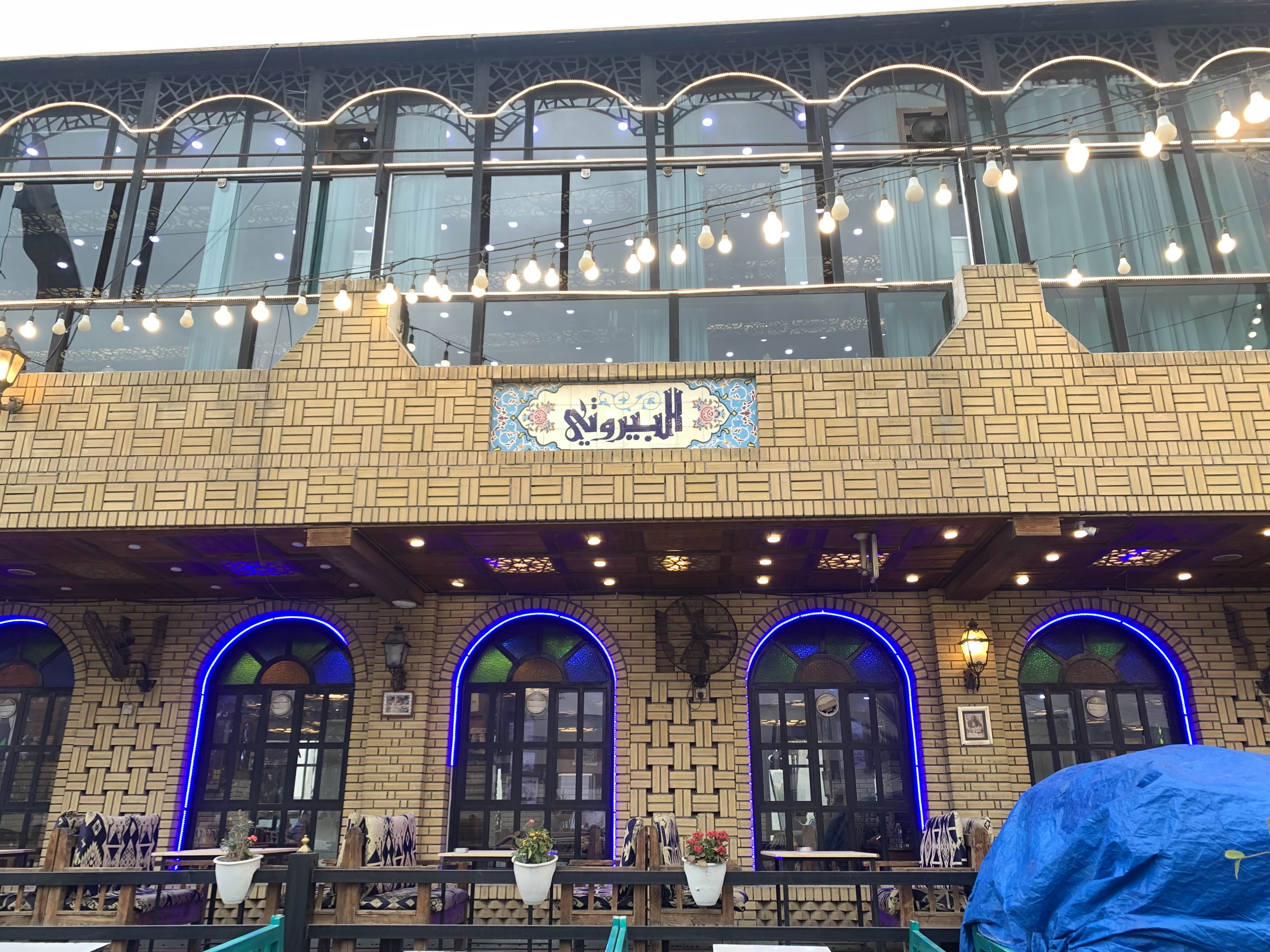
- Interactive map of Al-Beiruti Café مقهى البيروتي

Restaurant information
- Established: 18th century
- Location: Baghdad, Iraq
- Coordinates: 33°20′44″N 44°22′12″E

Al-Beiruti Café (Arabic: مقهى البيروتي) is one of the oldest surviving coffeehouses in Baghdad, Iraq, located on the Tigris River, on the Karkh side of the city. The coffeehouse is recognized as an important Iraqi heritage site. The coffeehouse is notable for overlooking the Tigris River, and for being a gathering place for writers, artists, and neo-classical poets.

== Historical background ==
=== First coffeehouse ===
Baghdadi anecdotes suggest that the coffeehouse was established in the 18th century by a Lebanese merchant named "Muhammad al-Beiruti." The oldest mention of the coffeehouse was by the British journalist and traveler James Silk Buckingham when he visited Baghdad in 1819. Although he never mentioned it by name. While sitting in the Hassan Pasha Café, Buckingham's attention was attracted by the coffeehouse's lights, which is located on the other side of the Tigris River. He described it by saying "Its lights are on the waves of the Tigris River." This indicates that the date of building the café preceded Buckingham's visit by years. Al-Beiruti Café's name is usually also attributed to one of its owners "Ibrahim al-Beiruti al-Karkhi", the son of Muhammad al-Beiruti, who was nicknamed "al-Beiruti" due to his travel to Beirut and it was originally made of wood. It was a place visited by both adults and children where issues related to economic, political, and other affairs are discussed. In addition to serving tea and coffee, it was also famous for its hookah servings. The corners of the back of the café were dedicated to gambling players, headed by Ibrahim al-Beiruti himself, which harmed the reputation of the coffeehouse once discovered. Nevertheless, it continued to be a gathering spot for poets and artists. Playing cards also didn't exist until 1924.

During the Kingdom of Iraq, the country saw a massive growing movement of art and poetry, especially in the 1940s. Coffeehouses served as a gathering place for these artists. In al-Beiruti Café, many prominent Iraqi writers and poets were traditionalists eager to preserve Arabic literature and neo-classical poetry. The patrons of the coffeehouse reacted negatively against young writers and poets, such as a young al-Haydari, due to their poetry which was considered a "Western plot" against the Arabic literature heritage.

=== Second coffeehouse ===
In the spring of 1954, the levels of the Tigris River rose due to the abundance of rain, which led to the flooding of Baghdad and the sinking and destruction of the café. In 1978, the Government of Baghdad re-opened a second coffeehouse with the same name, although this time on the opposite side of the old coffeehouse. Nevertheless, the same activities as the first coffeehouse continued and provided its services until 2014 when new halls were built, including the Baghdad Hall, the solar hall, and the library hall, which is designated for reading books, in addition to the floating hall on the Tigris River. To this day, the coffeehouse remains active, especially during the summer, and acts as a resting place for the young working class.

== See also ==
- Café culture of Baghdad
- Al-Zahawi Café
- Shabandar Café
