= Hasan 'Ajami Café =

Old heritage coffeehouse in Baghdad, Iraq

The Hasan 'Ajami Café (Arabic: مقهىٰ حسَن عجمي, lit. 'Hasan the Persian's Coffeehouse') is an old coffeehouse located on al-Rashid Street in Baghdad, Iraq. It's typically considered one of the more well-known Baghdadi coffeehouses in the city and the most associated with al-Rashid Street. It's also known for being visited by many Iraqi intellectuals throughout the 20th century. The coffeehouse was also known as a social forum for many segments of Iraqi society ranging from merchants to eavesdroppers.

== Historical background ==
The coffeehouses was originally founded by a man named Hasan al-'Ajami Chai-khana in 1917 and later became one of the most well-known coffeehouses on the avenue located north of the Haydar-Khana Mosque. The coffeehouse was decorated with rare Russian samovars decorated with pictures of Russian tsars and official seals dating back to the 19th century. As well as tea flasks and hookah bottles. The walls were also decorated with pictures of King Faisal I, King Ghazi, and Qajar Shahs. The coffeehouse was frequented by the neo-classical poet Muhammad Mahdi al-Jawahiri, which was reported to be his favorite, where he would recite poems and meet younger poets.

The coffeehouse declined after the 2003 US invasion and many of its decorations and items disappeared or were damaged.

== See also ==
- Coffeehouse culture of Baghdad
