= Shabandar Café =

Café and social hub in Baghdad, Iraq

Shabandar Café مقهى الشابندر
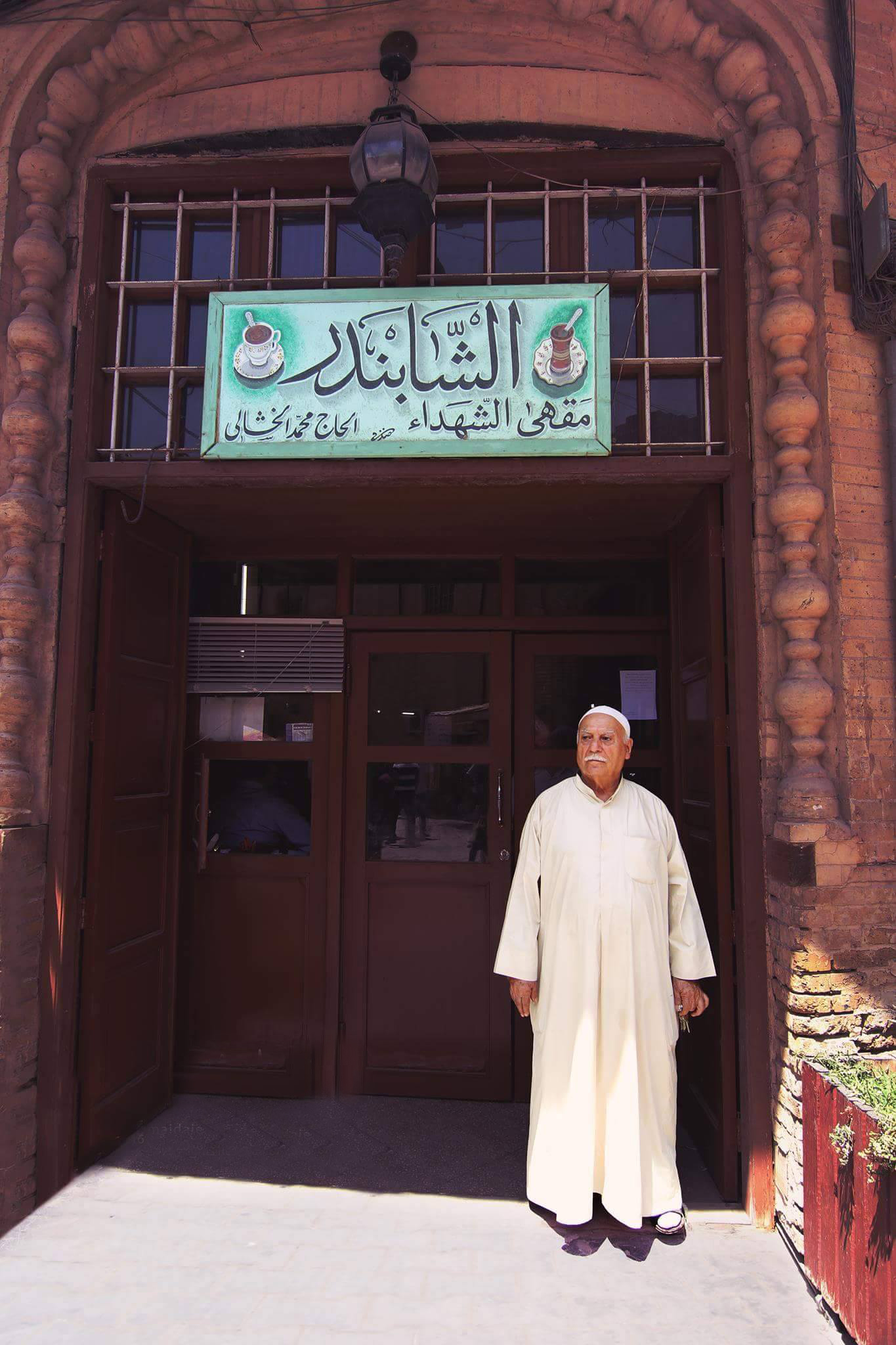
- Interactive map of Shabandar Café مقهى الشابندر

Restaurant information
- Established: 1917
- Owner: Muhammad al-Khashali (formerly)
- Location: Baghdad, Iraq

The Shabandar Café (Arabic: مقهى الشابندر, romanized: Maqha al-Shabander) is one of the oldest and most famous coffeehouses in Baghdad, Iraq. It is located at the end of al-Mutanabbi Street near the Qushla. The coffeehouse building was previously "al-Shabandar Press", which was established in 1907 and was owned by Musa al-Shabandar, who became Minister of Foreign Affairs at the time of the King Faisal II in 1941. The coffeehouse is now a cultural and intellectual social hub and is considered one of the most important heritage landmarks of Baghdad where poetry, politics, culture, literature, and art are discussed and a place to increase the visitor's knowledge about said topics.

== Etymology ==
The Shabandar Café was named after its owners from al-Shabandar family, a Baghdadi family known for their wealth, prestige, and their work in the field of trade and politics. The etymology of the name is from the Persian title شاه‌بندر shāhbandar meaning "harbourmaster" or "port master". This was an official in charge of traders and collection of taxes in the port cities of Safavid Iran.

== Historical background ==
=== Establishment and cultural role ===
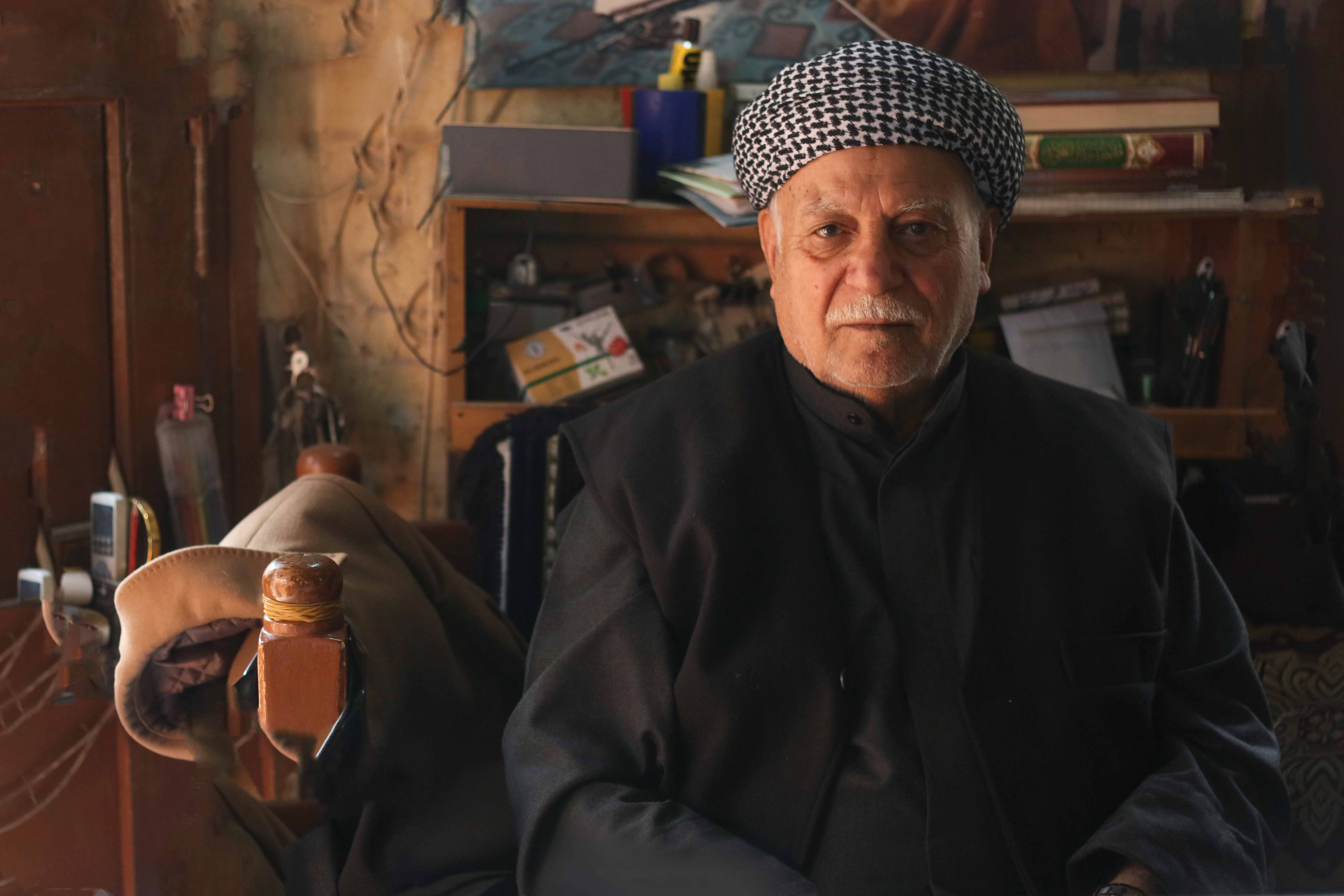
Muhammad al-Khashali, the former main owner of the coffeehouse.

The long-time former owner of the café, Muhammad al-Khashali, said that the coffeehouse was established in 1917, but the building used to be a printing press called "Al-Shabandar Press" owned by Musa al-Shabandar, as this building was previously a printing house for printing books. A controversy then caused Musa to be exiled from Iraq for a few years and when he returned, he began to restore what was left of the building. Musa reinvented it as a coffeehouse, offered it for rent. The coffeehouse started to receive customers in 1917, and started to hold concerts for Iraqi maqam, the proceeds of which were returned to charity in Baghdad. The coffeehouse was also a gathering ground and a cultural station for various writers, poets, writers, intellectuals and personalities including political ones such as Nuri al-Said and Abd al-Karim Qasim, due to its proximity to government institutions in the country. The coffeehouse also became a gathering ground where political demonstrations were launched such as a demonstration against the Anglo-Iraqi Treaty in 1948.

=== Modern history and restoration ===
In March 2007, in the wake of sectarian violence in the country following the US invasion of Iraq in 2003, the Shabandar Café was a victim to a bombing from a booby-trapped car situated on al-Mutanabbi Street which killed more than a hundred people. As a result of the horrific explosion, the coffeehouse was completely destroyed along with its library. In this incident, four of al-Khashali's sons and a grandson of his were killed and found among the rubble and under the rubble. This accident also caused their mother to lose her sight due to the shock, then she died several months later. At the time, al-Khashali was thought to have also been killed but was on a break, and upon hearing the news, al-Khashali was heartbroken and had to control his anger. Al-Khashali made it his goal to keep the coffeehouse as a center of cultural attraction and to preserve its cultural features and its old identity. As a result, the café was rebuilt, with funding from the state, merchants, and its customers. The coffeehouse has also gained a new name after this, "The Martyrs Café."

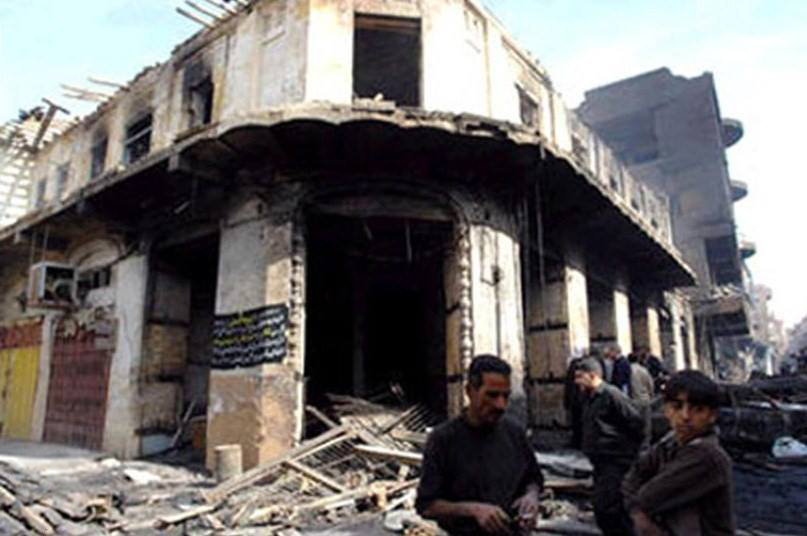
The ruins of the coffeehouse following the terrorist attack.

Response to the bombing was wide. Two days after the incident, Iraqi poet Ahmed Hussain recited a poem on the ruins of the coffeehouse with journalists and people, including both the elderly and younger generation, gathering around him to listen.

During the incident, Iraqi artist Emad Ali Abbas, who studied Cinema Department in the Academy of Fine Arts in Baghdad in 2006, made a twenty-five minute long documentary titled "A Candle for Shabandar Café" chronicling the history of the coffeehouse and its significance, as well as distinct sections. The documentary includes shots of the coffeehouse's exterior and interior, as well as shots of people conversing, drinking tea, and reading. Describing it as a historic location and an intellectual refuge since games, shouting, and televisions aren't prominent in the café. The goal of the documentary was to document the Shabandar Café as well as showcase another part of Baghdad that wasn't the sectarianist violence that was taking place at the time. As such, owners and customers are interviewed on the café and al-Mutanabbi Street. However, during the filming process, the suicide bombing attack took place which destroyed his filmic subject. Eventually filming continued months later but as he was leaving al-Mutanabbi Street, he was attacked by a group of thugs that stole his camera and shot in the legs. Emad took an entire year to recover. This led to the inclusion of Emad's personal experience in the documentary as an epilogue. The documentary won the third prize in the Student Documentary section of the 2008 Gulf Film Festival in Dubai.

The Shabandar Café remains active and still maintains its external appearance, after restoration and renovation. Its walls are also covered with pictures, testimonies, and newspaper clippings which include various aspects of Iraqi society and history. Among the pictures are the pictures of the four sons and grandson that the owner of the coffeehouse had lost to the bombing as a memorabilia. It remains a social club for merchants, sheikhs, employees, writers and foreign tourists. It is also a place where personal interviews are done by Iraqi media.

On 11 January 2025, al-Khashali, who was a prominent social figure in Baghdad, died after running the coffeehouse since 1963. Many, including the Iraqi prime minister Muhammad Shi'a al-Sudani, offered their condolences on his death.

== Description and architectural features ==
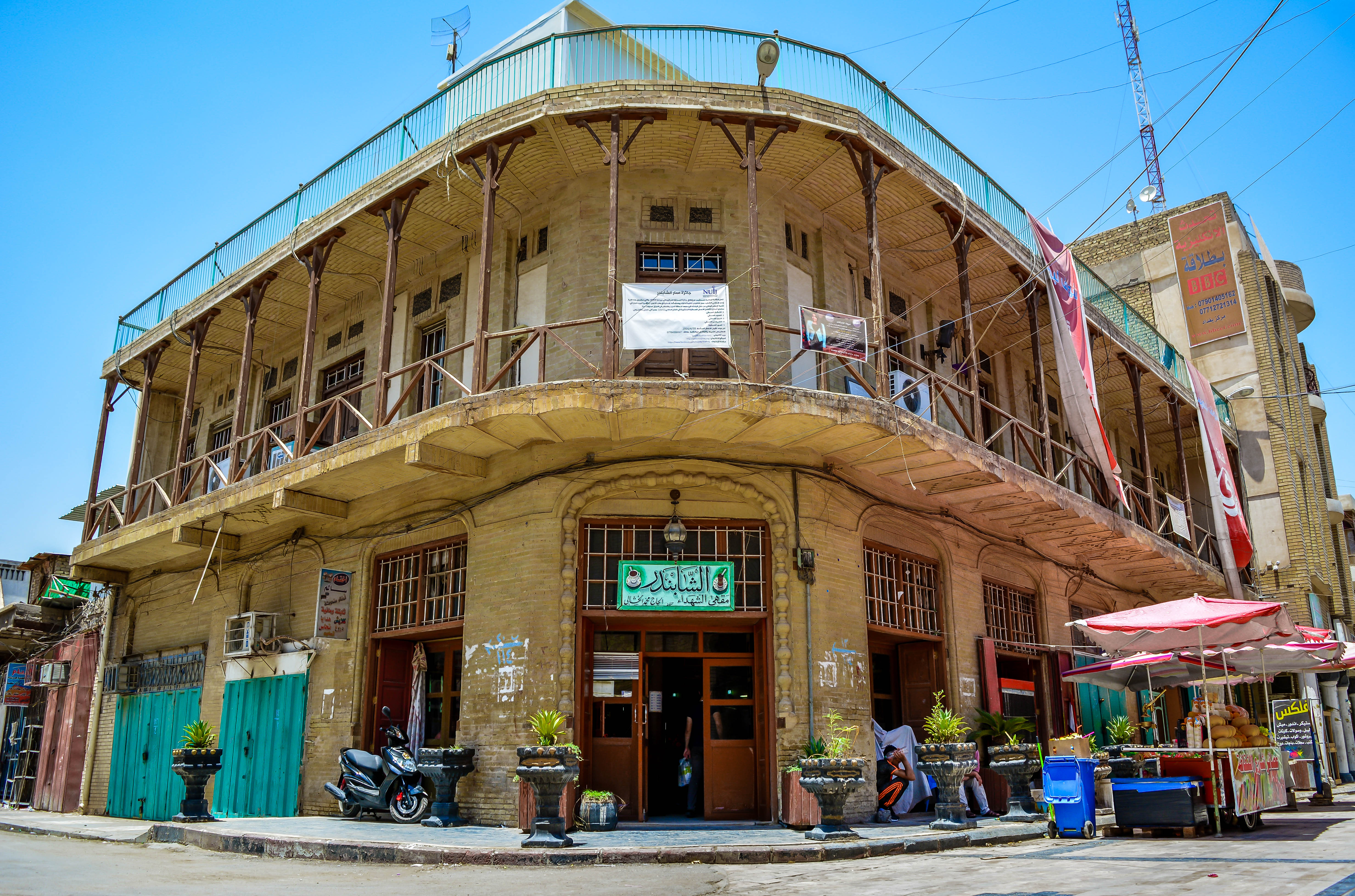
The exterior of the coffeehouse's building in 2016.

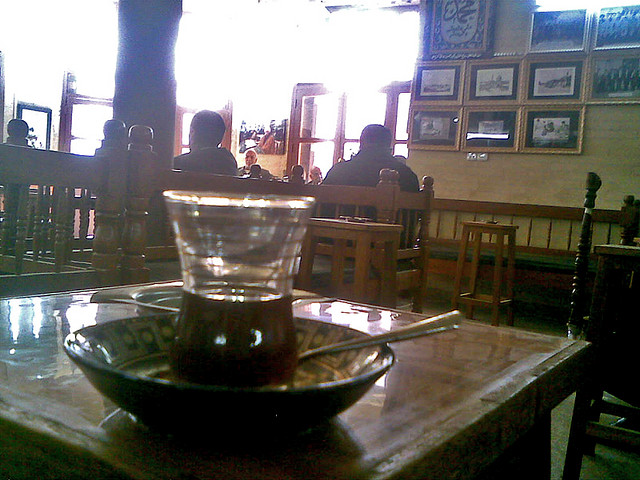
Interior in 2009.

The Shabandar Café is characterized by the original Baghdadi architectural style that it contains; the café shows off one of the rare examples of authentic Baghdadi architecture that still stands today. Its building is built of bricks, plaster and gypsum. Given the grandeur of the building and its uniqueness in terms of design and engineering in which Iraqi architecture excelled, it is considered one of the most important archeological sites in Baghdad that is still standing. Al-Khashali explained that he wanted to distance himself from the commercial mentality to preserve its old atmosphere, including the use of old wooden seats and old samovars that are still being used inside.

The coffeehouse's interior walls on the first ground floor are decorated with old photographs dating back to Baghdad during the 19th century and the early 20th century including pictures of Ottoman pashas such as Halil Kut and pictures of other Iraqi personalities such as King Faisal I, King Faisal II, Royal Era ministers and Iraqi poets and artists and even foreign celebrities such as Umm Kulthum. The coffeehouse serves lemon tea brewed the traditional Baghdadi way and the hookah. Unlike many coffeehouses in Iraq, games such as dominoes and backgammon were banned in the café to give space for dialogue and cultural exchanges. The coffeehouse also includes two floors, the upper floor includes the old offices of the newspaper printing that predate the 1930s.

== See also ==
- Café culture of Baghdad
- Al-Beiruti Café
- Al-Zahawi Café
