= Jamil Sidqi al-Zahawi =

Iraqi poet and philosopher (1863–1936)

Jamil Sidqi al-Zahawi Arabic: جميل صدقي الزهاوي
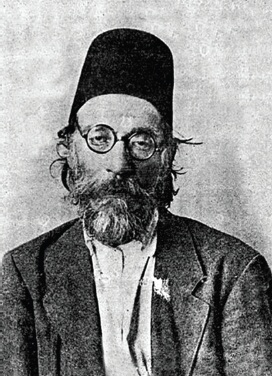
- Born: 17 June 1863; Baghdad, Ottoman Iraq
- Died: January 1936 (aged 72); Baghdad, Kingdom of Iraq

Philosophical work
- School: Arabic literature
- Main interests: Poetry, skepticism, feminism

Jamil Sidqi al-Zahawi (Arabic: جميل صدقي الزهاوي, ALA-LC: Jamīl Ṣidqī al-Zahāwī; 17 June 1863 – January 1936) was a prominent Iraqi poet and philosopher. He is regarded as one of the greatest contemporary poets of the Arab world and was known for his defence of women's rights.

Born to a Baghdadi family of Kurdish origins, he was educated in various literature and grammar forms translated into Arabic, mastering various languages. He served in various Ottoman administrations and taught philosophy in various regions. Described as a liberal thinker and an "agnostic", he was controversial for advocating the adaptation of Western sciences, thoughts, modernism, and national freedom, as well as for his stance on women's rights. Al-Zahawi is regarded as one of the big three of leading neo-classical Iraqi poets alongside al-Rusafi, and al-Jawahiri.

== Early life and education ==
Jamil Sidqi al-Zahawi was born on 18 June 1863 in Baghdad. He descended from a prominent family of Kurdish origin. His father was the Mufti of Iraq and a member of the scholarly Baban clan. His parents separated soon after the children were born and his mother returned to her family, taking her children with her. His father, who was partial to Jamil's intelligence and quick temper, decided to raise the boy himself. His father taught him poetry from a very young age and encouraged him to develop an inquisitive mind.

Being raised in Ottoman Baghdad, where he was initially educated in kuttab (Qur'anic school), he did not receive a formal education; instead his father engaged private tutors to teach him science, rhetoric and grammar. He may have gained some formal education in jurisprudence, logic, astronomy and exegesis, although details are sketchy. However, it is clear that he was mostly self-taught, using books, especially translations of European works on science and philosophy. Through his father, he participated in Baghdad's literary society by attending a majalis (social gatherings of the literary elite) for discussions of various topics. The informal nature of his education combined with his early exposure to debating societies, contributed to his love of debate and his inquisitive attitude.

In 1896, he was invited to Istanbul. Between 1896 and 1898, he based himself in Istanbul but also travelled to Yemen on an Imperial decree, as part of a delegation to carry out reforms. In Istanbul, he was appointed professor of Islamic studies at the Malakki School and professor of Arabic literature at the University of Istanbul. During this period, he came into contact with the Turkish literary society and was exposed to those Turkish poets who were experimenting with modern poetry and seeking to liberate their work from the constraints of meter and rhyme. He also had the opportunity to read Arabic translations of works by Shakespeare and Western poetry. These encounters exposed him to new ideas about modern poetry and its role in political debate, and would subsequently inform his work in terms of both its form and the choice of subject matter.

Al-Zahawi returned to Baghdad briefly, but he was exiled for his outspoken views, by Sultan Abdul Hamid II and forced to return to Istanbul in around 1908. In Istanbul, he worked for the Committee of Union and Progress (CUP), also known as the Young Turks, where he met with prominent members of the Union movement. He became highly politicized by the relationships formed at this time and remained committed to social reform throughout his life. To this end, he regularly contributed regular articles to various publications in Iraq and in Istanbul.

== Career in poetry and politics ==
Following his return to Baghdad, he held numerous government positions: as a member of the Baghdad Education Council, where he championed education for women and as an editor of the only newspaper in Baghdad, al-Zawra. He was appointed a professor of law at Baghdad University, but his tenure was short-lived. A controversial article on women's emancipation which exhorted women to give up the veil and called for reforms to the existing divorce laws, caused a public outcry, resulting in his home being mobbed for an entire week. In order to appease the public, al-Zahawi was dismissed from his academic position in 1910. Following this incident, he fled Iraq and resided first in Egypt and later in Turkey.

His final return to Baghdad was after the British Mandate was formed in 1920. After Iraq's independence in 1921, he was elected to parliament twice and appointed to the upper chamber (1925–29). In his spare time, he could be found in Baghdad's cultural cafés, where he actively participated in arguments with poets and literary figures.

During his career, al-Zahawi was a critic of the Wahhabis, a reformist religious movement that was the foundation of the Kingdom of Saudi Arabia. He denounced their claims that only they were the true Muslims due to their radical acts. Al-Zahawi was also known to tackle the topic of women's rights, criticizing the wearing of the veil, the practice of older men marrying adolescent girls, forced marriage without previous acquaintance, polygamy, and male privileges.

He was one of the leading writers in the Arab world, publishing in the major newspapers and journals of Beirut, Cairo, and Baghdad. Describing his life in a collection of his poems, he wrote, "In my childhood I was thought of as eccentric because of my unusual gestures; in my youth, as feckless because of my ebullient nature, lack of seriousness, and excessive playfulness; in my middle age as courageous for my resistance to tyranny; and in my old age as an apostate because I propounded my philosophical views."

He clung to his principles of simplicity in poetry and the avoidance of the artifice and false conceits that had preoccupied traditional poets. He also stressed the importance of poetry as a vehicle for social commentary. However, his work attracted literary criticism in the period following the first World War, when a wave of nationalism began to influence the arts. By this time, his forthright language and prose-like verse began to look unsophisticated and outdated. Moreover, his use of blank verse, which had always been experimental, began to look naïve and clumsy. Although he lost favor with critics, he remained popular with the people because of his gifts as an orator and the accessibility of his writing.

Al-Zahawi's sister, Asma al-Zahawi, was the founder of the controversial Women's Awakening Club which focused on educating illiterate girls, aiding orphan girls, charity events, sponsoring scholarships, and running health clinics.

=== Al-Zahawi Café ===
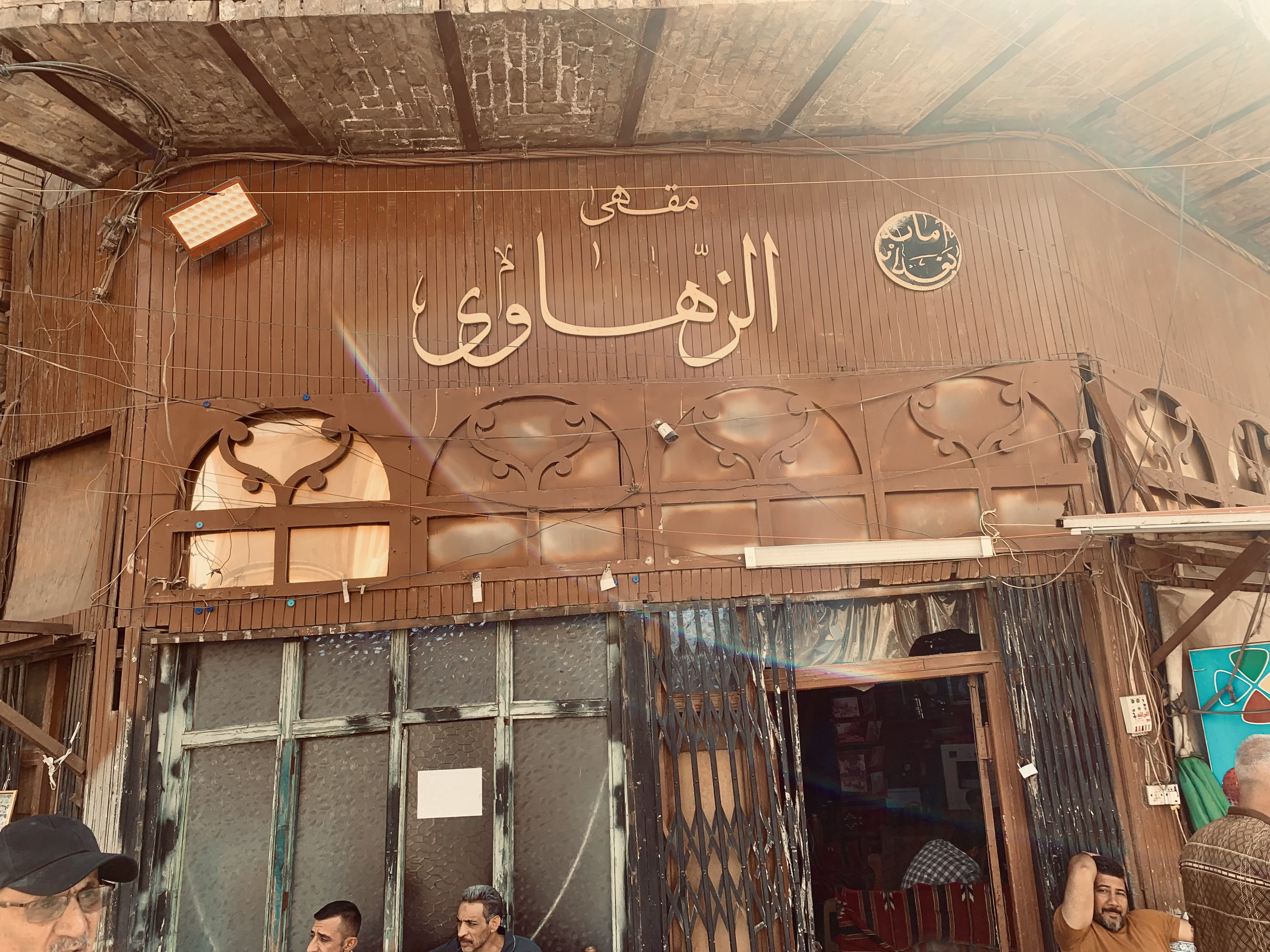
Al-Zahawi Café's exterior as of 2023

According to an anecdote, al-Zahawi was once invited by former Iraqi prime minister Nuri al-Said to a simple coffeehouse that was named "al-Amin's café" due to lack of modest areas at the time. Al-Zahawi took a liking to the coffeehouse and began to make it his main visiting place. The coffeehouse quickly became a den for writers and thinkers. The coffeehouse was later renamed "Al-Zahawi Café" after the poet. The coffeehouse became a scene for the "literary battles" feuds between al-Zahawi and al-Rusafi due to heated discussions on several topics. Despite the fact that both agreed on the issue of women's rights. Al-Rusafi had once invited a young al-Jawahiri to one of these battles to which the young poet confronted al-Zahawi's doubts of a world creator. In return, al-Zahawi aggressively confronted al-Jawahiri for calling his father a "monkey" to which al-Jawahiri reportedly replied "I said, his parents were monkeys."

== Later life ==
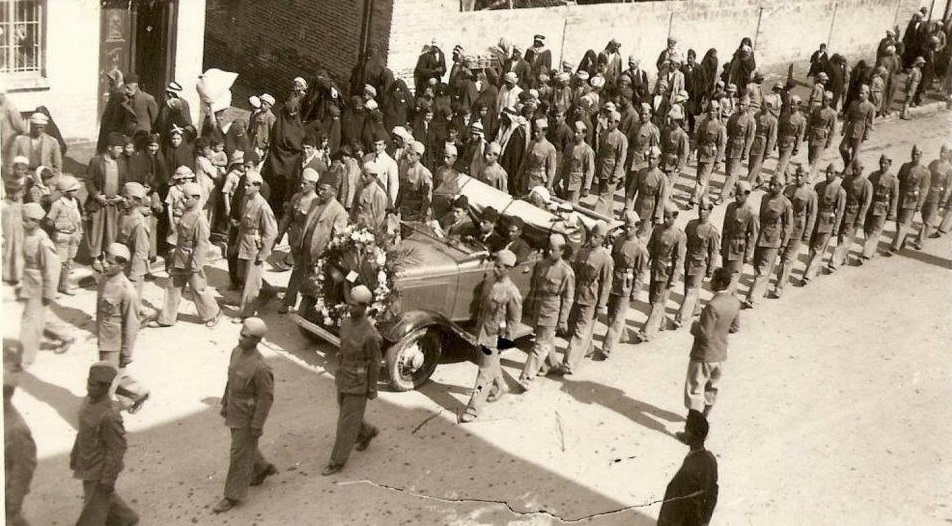
Funeral of al-Zahawi in 1936. Ma'ruf al-Rusafi can be seen sitting in the background.

Al-Zahawi spent the last years of his life isolated from the public literary cultural movement that he helped shape. He was sequestered in his home with his followers and friend paying him visits. This did not keep him away from his poetic career as he remained a poet whom many people came to listen to preferably due to his popular public persona, and his gifts as an orator. Also towards the end of his life, he was largely ostracized by the new literary elite. During the 1930s, because of his political views, al-Zahawi was also marginalized by the political establishment. He was embittered by the way he was treated, and cast himself as the "misunderstood poet/philosopher with a perpetually wounded ego."

=== Death ===
Al-Zahawi died in 1936. He was buried with a rich spectacle at the entrance to the al-Khayzuran Cemetery in al-Adhamiya. A room was built over his grave, and over his nephew, Sheikh Amjad al-Zahawi, grave who was buried nearby. ironically, Amjad did not attend his uncle's funeral due to him hating the Iraqi poet.

== Work ==
Al-Zahawi wrote poetry in Arabic, Persian, Turkish and Kurdish. Some of his works, such as The True Dawn in Refuting Those Who Deny the Seeking of Intercession and the Miracles of Saints (1905) have been translated into English, but he himself never learned any European language. Egyptian writer Taha Hussein said of him: "Zahawi wasn't only the poet of Arabic language or the poet of Iraq, he was also the poet of Egypt and of other countries... he was a poet of the mind... the Ma'arri of this era... but he is the Ma'arri who connected to Europe and used knowledge as a weapon."

The English writer, Gertrude Bell, was present at a dinner in 1921, when al-Zahawi read an ode to Faisal ibn Hussein. Bell writes:

"al-Zahawi stood up and recited a tremendous ode in which he repeatedly alluded to Faisal as King of Iraq and everyone clapped and cheered. [al-Zahawi] stepped forward...in white robes and a black cloak and big black turban and chanted a poem of which I didn’t understand a word. It was far too long and as I say quite unintelligible but nevertheless it was wonderful."

Al-Zahawi was the first Kurdish poet to introduce sh'ir musal (blank verse; free of rhyme, no adherence to rhyme or composed of different rhyme) and was an enthusiastic proponent of the form arguing that it liberated poets to focus on expressing their ideas rather than being locked into searching for a rhyming word or phrase. His philosophy and style made him one of the early modern poets in the Arab world and he was lauded as such during the Ottoman era.

He also published a number of works on the subject of astronomy including: The Universe, Gravitation and its Explanation, General Repulsion and Natural and Astronomical Phenomena, which expounded theories which were ultimately shown to be fundamentally flawed.

Among his works is Thawra fil Jahim (Revolt in Hell), which shows the influence al-Zahawi got from Italian poet Dante, depicts hell as being inhabited by scientists, poets, and philosophers who revolt, suppress fire, and arrest the guardians of hell.

=== Selected works ===
Al-Zahawi's most celebrated works include:

- Equality in Age poem translated from Arabic to English by Sivar Qazaz- a condemnation of the marriage of older Muslim men to young women
- The True Dawn in Refuting Those Who Deny the Seeking of Intercession and the Miracles of Saints, 1905 - book, collection of poems and writings, translation The Doctrine of Ahl al-Sunna Versus the 'Salafi' Movement, ISBN 1-871031-47-8, translated into English by Shaykh Muhammad Hisham Kabbani, As-Sunna Foundation of America, 1996.
- Al-Kalim al-Manzum [Poetic Utterances, in Arabic] anthology, originally published in Beirut in 1909, and republished by Leopold Classic Library as a classic edition in 2016
- Rubaiyyat al-Zahawi [Zahawi's Quatrains, in Arabic], anthology, 1924
- Diwan [Collected works], anthology, 1924
- Al-Lubab [The Essence, in Arabic], 1928
- Thawra fil Jahim [Revolt in Hell], long poem, 1931 and subsequently included in the collection of poetry, Aushal, published in 1934
- Aushal [Trickles, in Arabic], 1934
- Al-Thumala [Last Drops, in Arabic], 1939 (edited by his wife and published posthumously)

== See also ==
- Iraqi art
- Islamic poetry
- List of Iraqi artists
