= Ma'ruf al-Rusafi =

Iraqi poet and scholar (1875–1945)

- Arabic: معروف الرصافي
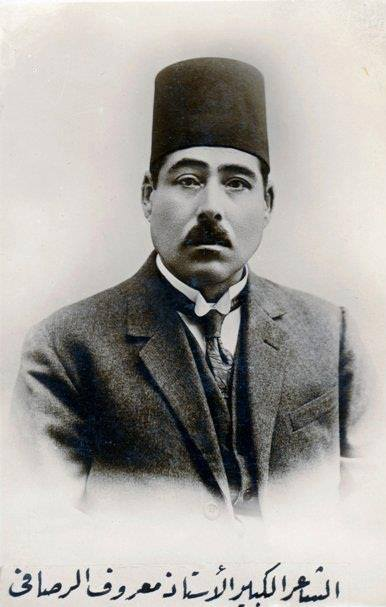
- Ottoman Era photograph of al-Rusafi
- Born: Ma'ruf bin Abd al-Ghani bin Mahmoud al-Jabbari al-Husseini c. 1875 (Ottoman Empire) Al-Rusafa, Baghdad Vilayet, Ottoman Iraq
- Died: 16 March 1945 (aged 69–70); Adhamiyah, Baghdad, Kingdom of Iraq
- Occupations: Poet, educationist, literary scholar
- Style: Neo-Classical
- Parent(s): Abd al-Ghani; Fathima

Ma'ruf bin Abdul Ghani al-Rusafi (Arabic: معروف عبد الغني الرصافي; 1875 – 16 March 1945) was an Iraqi poet, educationist and literary scholar. A political skeptic, al-Rusafi is regarded as a humanist, a social justice poet, and one of Iraq's national poets. However, he is considered by many as a controversial figure in modern Iraqi literature due to his advocacy of freedom and opposition to imperialism. Because of this, he is known as the poet of freedom, and as one of the big three neo-classical poets of Iraq, alongside al-Jawahiri, and al-Zahawi.

== Early life ==
Ma'ruf al-Rusafi is known to have been born in 1875 (his birth date has also been reported as 1 January 1877) at al-Rusafa in Baghdad, Iraq in a family of meagre financial means. His father, Abd al-Ghani, hailing from the Jibara Kurdish tribe, died while he was a child and was brought up by his mother, Fathima who was of Turkish ancestry. His early schooling was at the local Madrasa. Aspiring for a military career he joined al-Rushdiyya Military School in Baghdad, but had to leave after three years, having failed the grade. He continued his studies in Religion and Linguistics under an Arabic scholar, Sheikh Mahmud Shukri al-Alusi, and stayed there for twelve years where he had the opportunity to learn Sufism, Linguistics, Islamic principles and general sciences. After the completion of his studies, al-Rusafi started working as a teacher of Arabic at an elementary school run by one of his teachers, in al-Rushdiyya, and later, in 1902, moved to a secondary school in Baghdad.

== Travels and education ==
=== Life in Turkey and Syria ===
Al-Rusafi left for Turkey of the post Young Turk Revolution, in 1908, and started working in Istanbul as an Arabic lecturer at the Royal College. He worked at a local newspaper, Sabil al-Rashad, and is known to have led an active social life. In 1912, he became a member of the Turkish Chamber of Deputies, representing al-Muthanna district of Iraq and was re-elected in 1914. After the fall of the Ottoman Empire in 1918, al-Rusafi left Istanbul for Syria as the British authorities in Iraq prevented the return of Iraqis from Turkey. He settled in Damascus in 1919 and started teaching there, but only for a short time of less than one year. The local government of Syria, under Emir Faisal who was the son of the Sharif of Mecca, was also reluctant to accept al-Rusafi due to his opposition of the Arab Congress of 1913 held in Paris and the revolt of 1916 initiated by the Sharif of Mecca.

=== Brief stay in Jerusalem ===
The British local government under Gilbert Clayton reportedly in an attempt to keep al-Rusafi away from Iraq, offered him a job at the Teachers' Training College (Dar al-Mu’allimin), through Muhammad Kurd Ali, an acquaintant of al-Rusafi who went on to become the president of the Arab Academy of Damascus. Ma'ruf al-Rusafi reached Jerusalem in 1920 and resumed his career as a teacher of Arabic literature at the training college. During his stay in Jerusalem, Rusafi had the opportunity to associate himself with such literary figures as Issaf Nashashibi, the principal of the training college and in whose name, Issaf Nashashibi Center for Culture and Literature was established in 1982, Adil Jabr, the assistant director of education, Khalil al-Sakakini, an Arab nationalist and Nakhlah Zuraiq, an Arabic faculty member at the English College in Jerusalem. The association also provided al-Rusafi with opportunity to recite his poems at the gatherings and pursue his literary career.

In 1920, when Sir Herbert Samuel, a British Jewish diplomat, was appointed the High Commissioner of Palestine, he made a declaration at the Palestine Arab Congress held at Haifa that a higher college of Arab studies would be established in Jerusalem, a promise never fulfilled. Al-Rusafi, who was also an attendee at the Congress, later wrote in praise of the declaration, an act which is reported to have placed him in disfavor of the Arab nationalists and his students. Though al-Rusafi tried to pacify the situation by publishing an explanation in the local daily, Mir’at ash-Sharq, his efforts were not successful. A month after the controversy, when the supporters of Talib Pasha al-Naqib, a candidate at the Iraqi elections of 1921, decided to launch a newspaper, al-Rusafi was reported to have been invited to head the publication. Al-Rusafi left Jerusalem in March 1921, ending his stay of 18 months there.

=== Return to Iraq ===
Due to his criticism of the Arab Revolt in 1916, al-Rusafi was considered unwelcome in Iraq. Despite that, al-Rusafi is reported to have reached Baghdad on 9 April 1921, and there are unconfirmed reports of him being arrested a few days later. However, it is known that he started a newspaper, al-Amal but the daily had a short life. In 1923, he joined the committee for translation and Arabization as its vice chairman, and in 1924, he became an inspector in the Directorate of Education where he worked till 1927. The next move was as the professor of Arabic at the Higher Teachers Institute in 1927. In 1930, he was elected to the Parliament but continued his teaching job till 1937, after which his life is known to be in isolation.

== Political and social activism ==
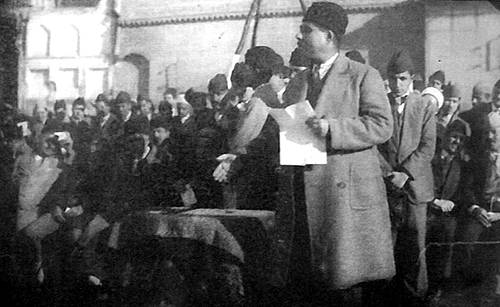
Ma'ruf al-Rusafi (front right) at the founding ceremony of al-Tifayidh School in Iraq, 1928

Ma'ruf al-Rusafi was known to have used his writing to bring out the social and political issues of the Middle East society, especially Iraqi society. His writings during his stay in Turkey are reported to be commentaries on the Ottoman period. He is regarded by many as the founder of the social school of poetry in Iraq. He is also known to have written in defense of women and widows and is seen as a strong advocate of education and knowledge. Some of his poems have been critical of the British occupation of Iraq of 1920, in the wake of the rise of King Faisal I to power after the World War I. Khalid Muhammed Hafiz, erstwhile judge of Fallujah had a collection of manuscripts about his interaction with al-Rusafi which revealed al-Rusafi as moderate in his religious beliefs. The manuscript was later published by Yousuf Izz al-Din, along with his own critical study of al-Rusafi's poems, as a book, al-Rusafi Yarwi Seerat Hayatih.

Al-Rusafi, who was embedded in regional literature and had a lack of "political homeland", was frustrated not only with his critics, but also post-Ottoman partitions. This was evident by his lack of support for the ruling Hashemite dynasty. After his return from Palestine, al-Rusafi would edit an opposition paper but claimed that this was at the "request of the government." Nevertheless, Ma'ruf al-Rusafi continued working as a teacher while serving in the Iraqi Parliament, and keeping up with his poetry. Despite his relations with the monarchy, al-Rusafi had written a poem praising King Faisal I. Faisal I had a magnanimous relationship with the poet and forgave him during mishaps. Especially since Faisal chose al-Rusafi to be a member of the Iraqi Parliament.

Al-Rusafi was also known to visit the Arif Agha Café on al-Rashid Street, and engage in reciting political poems to motivate demonstrators. Among the young poets who used to meet with al-Rusafu to seek his help was a young Buland al-Haydari. Al-Rusafi was also known to have heated "literary battles" with the poet al-Zahawi in the al-Zahawi Café.

== Later life and death ==
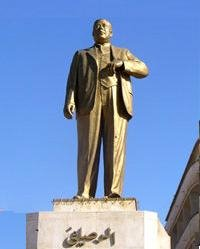
Bronze statue of Ma'ruf al-Rusafi near Martyr's Bridge, Baghdad, on al-Rashid Street.

Despite being a Sunni Muslim cleric in his younger years, he became a Deist and a believer in the Unity of Existence later in life. He further came to believe that Muhammad's claim to prophethood was a noble lie for the purpose of uniting the Arabs and raising their standard of living, and for this, al-Rusafi calls Muhammad "the greatest man known to history". Some sources incorrectly refer to al-Rusafi as an atheist.

Al-Rusafi died on 16 March 1945, having spent his last days in poverty, working in a tobacco shop in Baghdad. He had died at his home in the al-Safina neighborhood in al-Adhamiya on a Friday night in. He was buried in a solemn procession in which writers, notables, and pressmen passed by. He was buried in the al-Khayzuran Cemetery. Sheikh Hamdi al-Adhami prayed at his funeral, and the prayer for him was witnessed by the poet Waleed al-Adhami. Many have wrote poems in his eulogy.

A bronze statue of al-Rusafi was erected at the al-Rashid Street intersection, in Baghdad, near Souk al-Sarai.

== Literary works ==
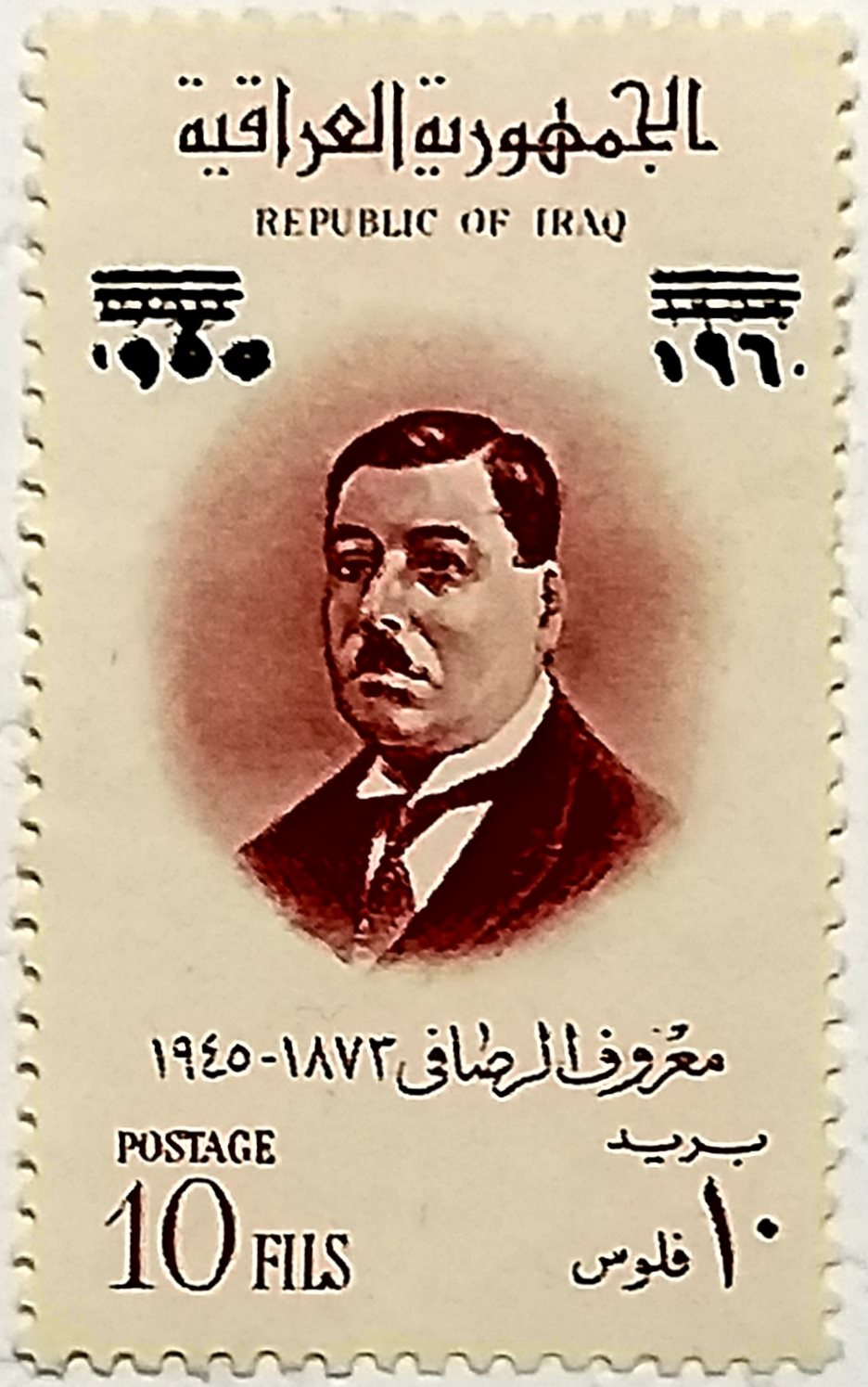
An Iraqi 10-fils postage stamp issued in 1960 in memory of the Iraqi poet.

He has written many pieces, one of which was important towards society and politics. One of his poems, 'A Praise to the Development of the Future' talked about how "people are too proud of their history rather than developing their future." Ma'ruf al-Rusafi was acquainted with western literature through Turkish translations and his writing career started while he was in Istanbul by way of socio political articles in journals such as al-Muqtataf, and al-Muayyad, published from Syria and Egypt. His first book of poetry, Diwan, was released in 1910. Al-Rusafi, who is credited with the adding ideas and values to modern Iraqi poetry, has written on a wide range of topics such as nationalism, society, politics and reforms. His contributions are classified into publications and manuscripts and may be listed as:

=== Publications ===
- Diwan - collection of poems in four chapters, al-Kawniyat (7 poems), al-Ijtemaiyat (19 poems), al-Tarikhiyat (9 poems) and al-Wasfiyat (56 poems). The book was republished in 1932, expanded into 11 chapters. The third edition was brought out in 1952 and six more editions have been published since then.
- Al-Anashid al-Madrasiyah - collection of poems written in 1920.
- Al-Ruya - novel in Turkish language, later translated into Arabic. The novel, written in Turkish language during the period of Ottoman Empire and based on the life of Turkish writer, Namık Kemal, is known to have a veiled call for awakening. It was translated into Arabic, after the 1908 Young Turk Revolution.
- Dafu al-Hajanah fi Irtidah al-Luknah - a book of linguistics composed of words and usages of the Ottoman language, published in 1912 by Sada e Millat.
- Nafu al-Taiyb fi al-Khitaba wa al Khatib - a compilation of al-Rusafi's lectures at Madrassa al-Waizin, Istanbul, published in 1917 by al-Awqaf al Isalmiya publications.
- Durus fi Tarikh al-Lughah al-Arabiyah - lecture compilation during al-Rusafi's tenure as the inspector of Arabic language, delivered at Dar al-Muallimin al-Aliah, Baghdad, published in 1928.
- Muhadarat al-Adab al-Arabi (Muhadarat al-Adab al-Arabi) - collection of speeches during his tenure as the vice president of Translation and committee. It was published in 1921.
- Tamaim al-Tarbiyah wa al-Talim - collection of poems from Turkey days, published in 1924.
- Compilation of Lectures - collection of lectures given to teachers about the necessity of Arabic teaching, given during his stint at the Ministry of Education as the inspector of Arabic language. Published in 1926.
- Rasa'il al-Taliqat - a three volume work, published in 1944 by Matbatu al-Ma'rif publications, Baghdad.
- Ala Babi Sijni Abi al-Ala - critical study of Ma Abil Alaa fi Sijnihi, a book written by Taha Hussain. Published in 1947, after al-Rusafi's death.

=== Manuscripts ===
- Al-Risālah al-Irāqīyah fī al-Siyāsah wa al-dīn wa al-Ijtimā - a socio-political study written during al-Rusafi's stay in Fallujah during 1933 to 1941; published in 1940.
- Khawatir wa Nawadir - critical essays on literature, society, education, religion and politics, published in 1940.
- Kitab al-Aalah wa al-Idarah…wa ma Yattibi‘uhuma min al-Malabis wa al Marafiq wa al-Hanat - a book on linguistics and the Arabization of usages in foreign languages.
- Al-Shakhsiyah al Muhammadiyah au Hallu al Lughz al Muqaddas - a book on Prophet Mohammed, written in two stages; started the compilation in 1928 and completed while in Fallujah in 1941.
- Daf al-Maraq fi Kalami Ahli al-Iraq - a morphological and philological study of Iraqi languages.
- Al-Adab al-Rafi fi Mizan al-Shir - Lectures on Rhetoric and Metre, delivered during his tenure at Dar al-Muallimin, in Baghdad.
- Aarau Abi al-Ala - Compilation of the poems of Abul Ala. The original compilation of 1924 was lost and a second compilation was done in 1938.

Al-Rusafi's works have been translated into many languages including Russian.

== See also ==
- Khalil al-Sakakini
- Herbert Samuel, 1st Viscount Samuel
- Gilbert Clayton
- Safa Khulusi
