= Al-Zahawi Café =

Heritage coffeehouse in Baghdad, Iraq

Al-Zahawi Café مقهى الزهاوي
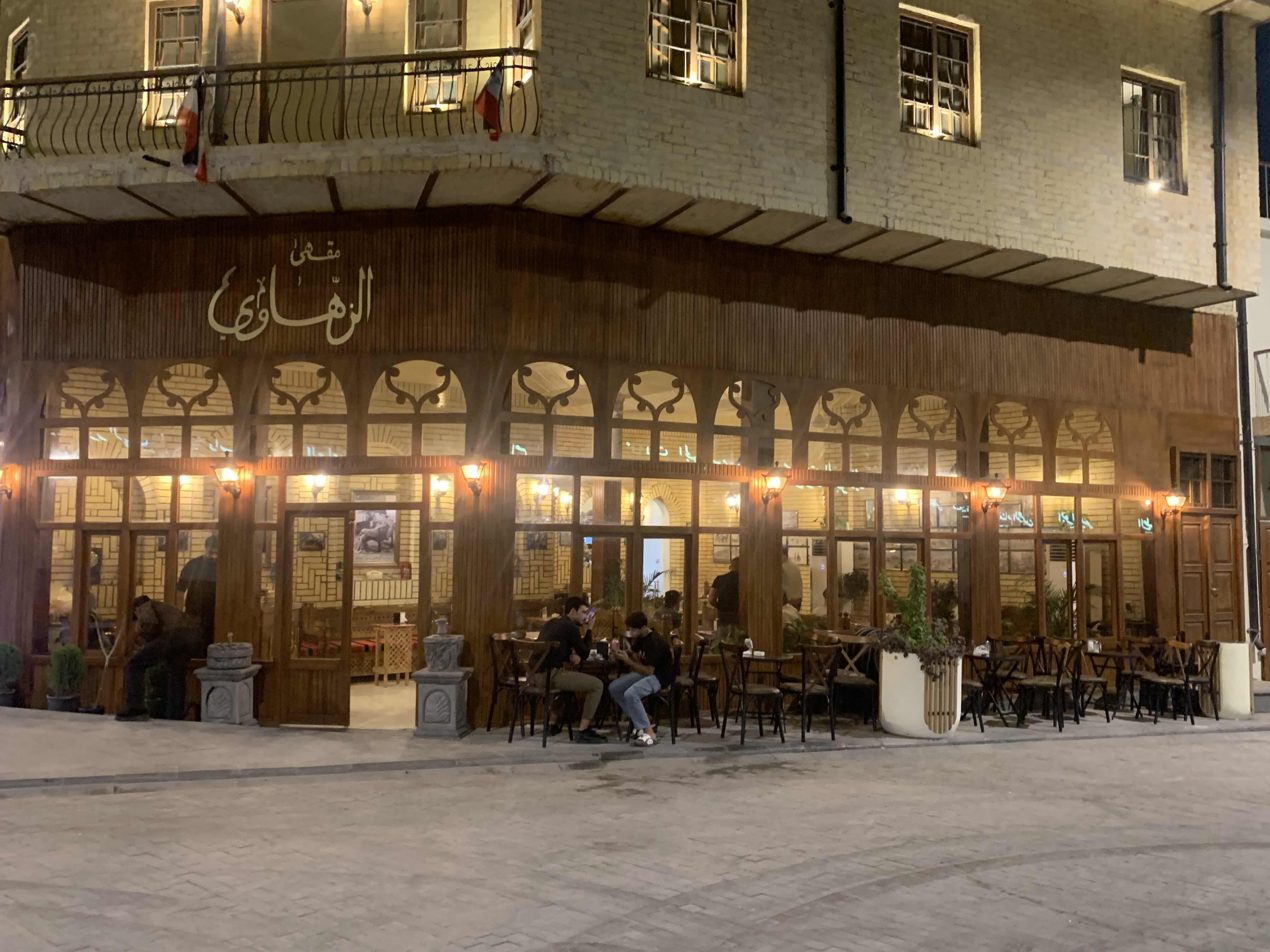
- Interactive map of Al-Zahawi Café مقهى الزهاوي

Restaurant information
- Established: 1917
- Owner: Haider Khraibet
- Location: Baghdad, Iraq
- Coordinates: 33°20′N 44°23′E

Al-Zahawi Café (Arabic: مقهى الزهاوي) is a heritage coffeehouse located in al-Rashid Street between al-Maidan Square and Haydar-Khana Mosque in Baghdad, Iraq. The coffeehouse is one of the oldest traditional coffeehouses in Iraq with its establishment dating back to 1917. Named after the Iraqi poet and philosopher Jamil Sidqi al-Zahawi, the coffeehouse is one of the more well-known coffeehouses of Baghdad and housed many intellectuals, poets, singers, and journalists over its existence although it has declined in recent years since 2003.

== History ==
=== Overview as an Intellectual hub ===
The coffeehouse was established in 1917 and was originally known as "Amin's Café", it was a shed with nothing but old benches and chairs. It didn't get its name until Nuri al-Said invited Iraqi poet and philosopher Jamil Sidqi al-Zahawi to the coffeehouse for a meeting due to the lack of respectable clubs or hotels at the time. The coffeehouse was later named after him and became a gathering ground for writers and thinkers. It's considered one of the most famous cafés in Baghdad. Among the most famous personalities associated with the Café are Ma'ruf al-Rusafi, Muhammad Fadhel al-Jamali, Abd al-Karim Qasim, Muhammad al-Qubanchi and many more. The walls of the café includes many framed pictures of those personalities.

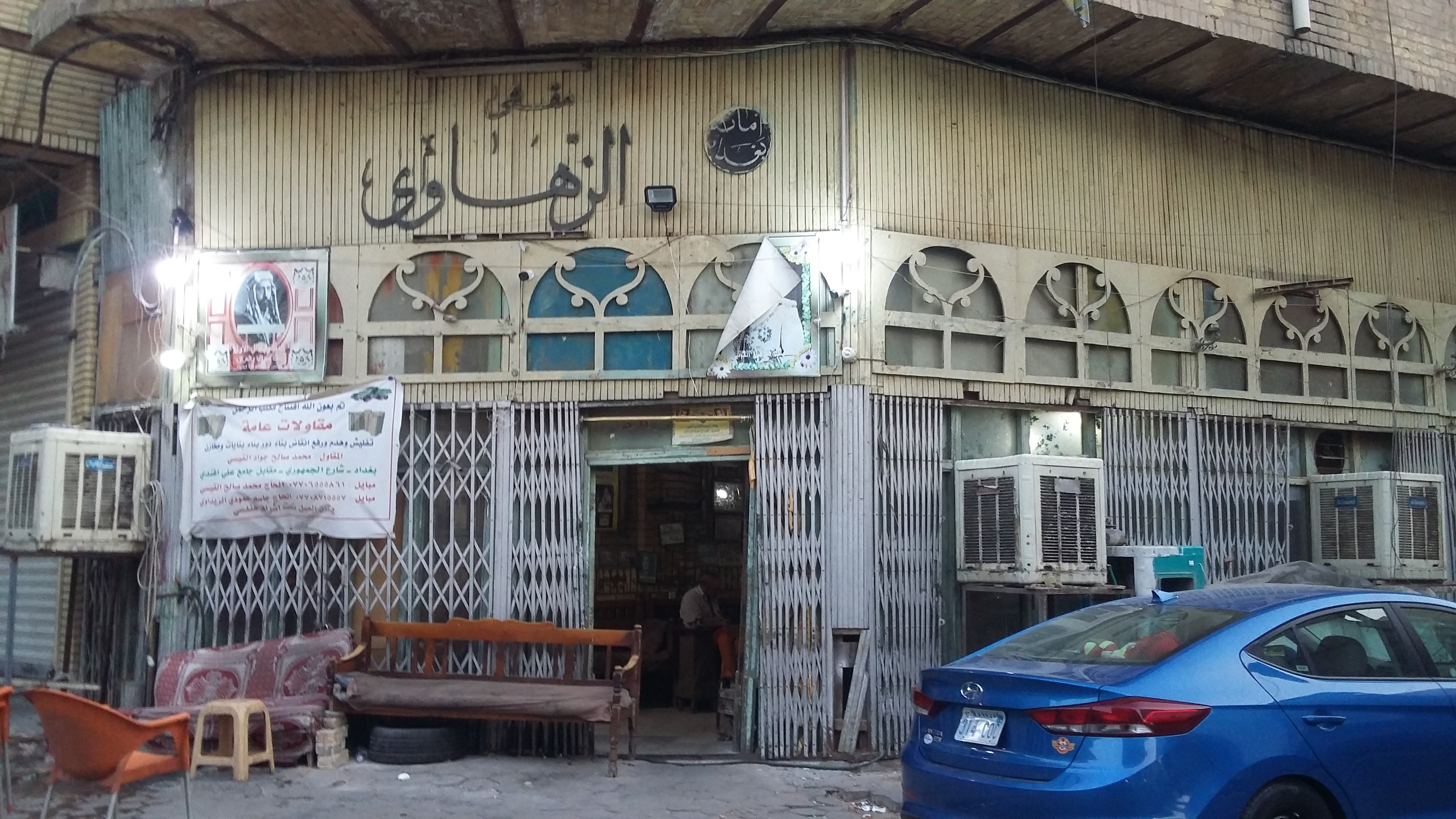
Al-Zahawi Café's old exterior.

In the 1930s, the coffeehouse reached headlines of both Baghdadi and Cairo newspapers after the influential Bengali poet and philosopher, Rabindranath Tagore, had visited the coffeehouse. It was also noted that al-Zahawi himself had a rivalry with the Iraqi poet Ma'ruf al-Rusafi who he also had intense discussions with him in the coffeehouse. Nevertheless, the café remained active with large groups of influential groups and figures visiting it. Hookahs were given for free by the owner of the coffeehouse.

Due to its location, the coffeehouse was partially damaged during the 2003–2011 Iraq War. Although the coffeehouse was quickly rebuilt and reopened. Most of its visitors today are intellectuals, poets and the elderly and remains active despite decline in its activity in recent years.

=== 2022 Controversy ===
The coffeehouse was involved in controversy in 2022 after the mayor of Baghdad, Ammar Musa, ordered it to be closed temporarily after its owner played what he described as "low-lying songs", stressing that the owner of the coffeehouse "played songs that are not appropriate for the street and the heritage of the place, and the municipality has taken awareness and education measures about the status of this heritage coffeehouse." The coffeehouse was closed until its owner made a legal pledge to not play similar songs in the future. Many Iraqis took to social media to criticize the mayor, noting the many problems, negativities, and difficulties that Baghdad is facing and instead turned to an old heritage coffeehouse on charges of indecent songs.

== See also ==
- Café culture of Baghdad
- Al-Beiruti Café
- Shabandar Café
