= Muhammad Mahdi al-Jawahiri =

Iraqi neo-classical poet (1899–1997)

Muhammad Mahdi al-Jawahiri Arabic: محمد مهدي الجواهري
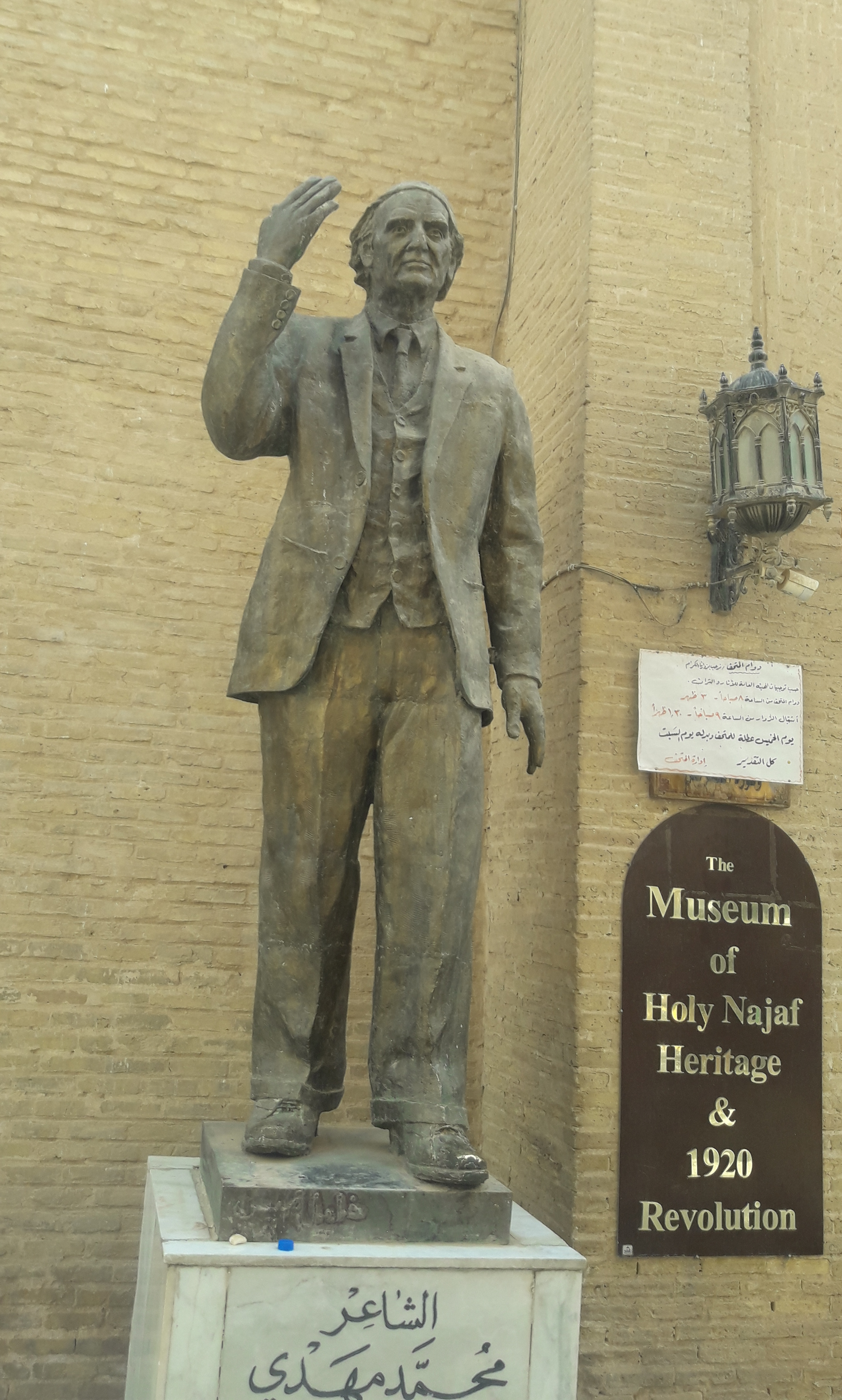
- Statue of al-Jawahiri in Najaf
- Born: July 26, 1899; Najaf, Ottoman Empire (Present Day Iraq)
- Died: July 27, 1997 (aged 98); Damascus, Syria
- Occupation: Poet
- Spouse: Amna al-Jawahiri
- Relatives: Abd al-Aziz al-Jawahiri (brother); Abd al-Husayn al-Jawahiri (father); Muhammad Hasan al-Najafi (grandfather)
- Writing career
- Genre: Arabic Poetry
- Notable works: Diwan al-Jawahiri, My Brother Jafar

Muhammad Mahdi al-Jawahiri (Arabic: محمد مهدي الجواهري); (26 July 1899 – 27 July 1997) was an Iraqi poet. Considered by many as one of the best and greatest Arabian poets in the 20th century, he was also nicknamed The Greatest Arabian Poet, and is considered a leading classical Iraqi poet and one of the big three neo-classical poets of Iraq alongside al-Rusafi, and al-Zahawi. Notable for his Neo-classical, traditional, and political-themed way of writing, his poems can be read in his collections such as Diwan al-Jawahiri, Return Post, and To Sleeplessness, and was honored by many governments, including Saddam Hussein's government.

Al-Jawahiri was born in the Iraqi city of Najaf into a family known for its literary interests. After publishing his first poem in 1921, he started to work in journalism and as a teacher in Baghdad. Despite harsh criticism towards the Hashemite monarchy, he maintained a good relationship with the royal family and maintained several positions in the royal court, and the Ministry of Education. Through his poetry, he became one of the most socially and politically influential people of his time.

== Early life and education ==
Muhammad Mahdi al-Jawahiri was born in 1899 in Najaf, Iraq. His father, 'Abd al-Husayn was a religious scholar among the clergy in Najaf who wanted his son to be a cleric as well. So he dressed him in a cleric's 'Abaya and turban at the age of ten. The origin of “Al-Jawahiri” goes back to his Najafi, Iraqi family. Since the 11th century Hijri (15th century CE), the most famous people have inhabited Najaf, and individuals named al-Najafi have earned the title “Bejeweled” (or al-Jawahiri) for their relationship to the book of fiqh values (religious scholarship) which one of his family's ancestors Shaykh Muhammad Hasan al-Najafi had written. The books were called “the jewel of speech in explaining the laws of Islam” and were composed of 44 volumes. Afterward, he was known as the “owner of the jewels,” and his family came to be called “bejeweled” (al-Jawahiri).

Al-Jawahiri read the Qur'an and memorized it at an early age. Then his father sent him to great teachers to teach him reading, writing, grammar, rhetoric, and jurisprudence. His father and others planned for him to learn speech from Nahj al-Balagha and poetry from the works of Abbasid Poet al-Mutanabbi. From a young age, he received solid grounding in the Arabic language studies, philosophy, rhetoric, and traditional Islamic sciences, which would help him in his later academic career. Due to Najaf's historic poetic nature, it benefitted the young poet and helped develop him childhood passion for poetry. He would also be inspired by the more modern works of Hafez Ibrahim, al-Jabal, and al-Rusafi.

== Poetry and career ==
Learning was organized at an early age and even in his childhood al-Jawahiri displayed an inclination for literature. He began to read the Book of Eloquence and Demonstration by al-Jahiz and the Muqaddimah by Ibn Khaldun, and collections of poetry. It was early in his life when he first wore the clothing of a religious man and he participated in the 1920 revolution against the British authorities.

=== Royal Court of King Faisal I ===
In the late 1920s, al-Jawhiri wrote of the relationship between King Faisal I and Arab Nationalists Sati' al-Husri. He recorded that Faisal I was angry with al-Husri due to him trying to inflame sectarian tensions in Iraq while Faisal I wanted to save Iraq from sectarianism, as such, there were no strong bonds between the two at the time. In 1927, while on a vacation in Iran, al-Jawahiri wrote some lines admiring Iran and its landscapes which al-Husri, who was general director at the Ministry of Education, used to frame al-Jawahiri as an Iranian loyalist and someone who impugned Iraq and Arabism by preferring Iran and its culture which became a controversial issue in Iraq. In his memoirs, al-Husri claimed that al-Jawahiri was an Iranian who had Iranian citizenship. At the time, al-Jawahiri was still working in Najaf as a school teacher and protested the unrealistic allegations but due to split opinions on the issue, as well as the fears of sectarianist tensions, al-Jawahiri decided to resign from his position respectfully. Even though the case was turning against al-Husri by this point. Due to this case, and also knowing that the poet came from an old Iraqi family that had a patriotic stance, Faisal I recruited al-Jawahiri as part of his royal court.

After a meeting with Sayyid Muhammad al-Sadr, who was a supporter against al-Husri's allegations, al-Jawahiri put on modest traditional robes and headed to King Faisal I's palace who congratulated him on his new position. The King took a liking to the poet who occupied him during his visits to various shrines, and also a trip south of the country where al-Jawahiri witnessed the King supporting various tribal sheikhs on the issue of agriculture in the region. Al-Jawahiri has also recorded that the King's office was a simple room with a table, a carpet, four chairs, a portrait of himself, and another of French writer Anatole France.

In 1929, King Faisal I opened the first girls' school in Najaf and received backlash from the conservative groups in the traditionalist city. In response during the opening occasions, al-Jawahiri, who was a Najafi himself, wrote scathing lines criticizing the conservative nature of the city's people in his poem named "The Reactionaries" which was published under a pen name in several newspapers. This would cause a large outcry in the city which reached King Faisal I's attention. Faisal I would confront al-Jawahiri reportedly saying "Are you aware of the calls and cables I have received that all say that this is the work of your "son, Muhammad," who works under your auspices and protections? And do you know how much grief this has caused me?" In response, al-Jawahiri apologized and offered to resign, but Faisal I forgave al-Jawahiri and decided to keep him in his royal court.

In 1930, he resigned from his position at court because it turned out to be incompatible with the content of some of his poems. In the following years, he was to make a living as a teacher and journalist instead.

=== 1936 Iraqi coup ===
In 1936, al-Jawahiri published the newspaper "al-Inqilab", following the military coup that was initiated by general Bakr Sidqi. Because of his positions against the coup, he was imprisoned for three months and the newspaper was closed. After his departure and the fall of the military coup government, he reopened the newspaper in the name of "al-Ra'i al-'Am". The articles he published were the reason for the newspaper’s closure once again, to the point that pressure prompted him to emigrate to Iran and then return after a while.

=== Career as a poet ===
In 1928, al-Jawahiri published the volume "Between Feelings and Emotions," his first poetry collection which he had been preparing since 1924 to distribute under the title "The Dangers of Poetry in Love, Nation, and Ode." After he left Najaf for Baghdad, he went to work in the press, and put out a group of papers – among them was al-Furat (The Euphrates). In 1938, he published what would be known as Diwan al-Jawahiri which was a collection of the poet's social and political poems in which al-Jawahiri's revolutionary stance is shown. The next edition would be published in three volume separately in 1949, 1950, and 1953.

When Iraqi poet Hussein Mardan was arrested on accounts of writing pornography after his poem collection "Naked Poems" was leaked, al-Jawahiri was called into the trial by the court's judge as a witness. Al-Jawahiri stated that Mardan should be praised for his poems, instead of imprisoned. Al-Jawahiri's testament helped Mardan's case. Later, Mardan, along with his friends, would seek advice from al-Jawahiri to advance their works in poetry further.

Al-Jawahiri was a part of the flourishing coffeehouse culture of Baghdad in the 1940s and the 1950s. Certain coffeehouses started to be associated with various writers, artists, and poets, especially those with already established respectable reputations like al-Jawahiri. Al-Jawahiri himself was started to be associated with the Parliament Café, and the Hasan Ajami Café on al-Rashid Street, in which he would recite poems that gave crowds motivations in demonstrations. Among al-Jawahiri's favorite coffeehouses was the Hasan Ajami Café, a coffeehouse that has a respectable reputation from the circle of Baghdad's artists and writers. In this coffeehouse, al-Jawahiri would meet various younger poets, including a young Mardan, seeking his advice and encouragement. Between 1930 and 1961, he edited a total of twelve newspapers, usually short-lived, which were often closed due to the uncompromising opinions he expressed, among others, freedom of speech. In the years between 1947 and 1948, he sat in the Iraqi parliament again, which was a goal he wanted to achieve so that he can have a platform to speak from on behalf of the Iraqi people, but resigned from his seat in protest against the provisions of the 1948 Anglo-Iraqi treaty.

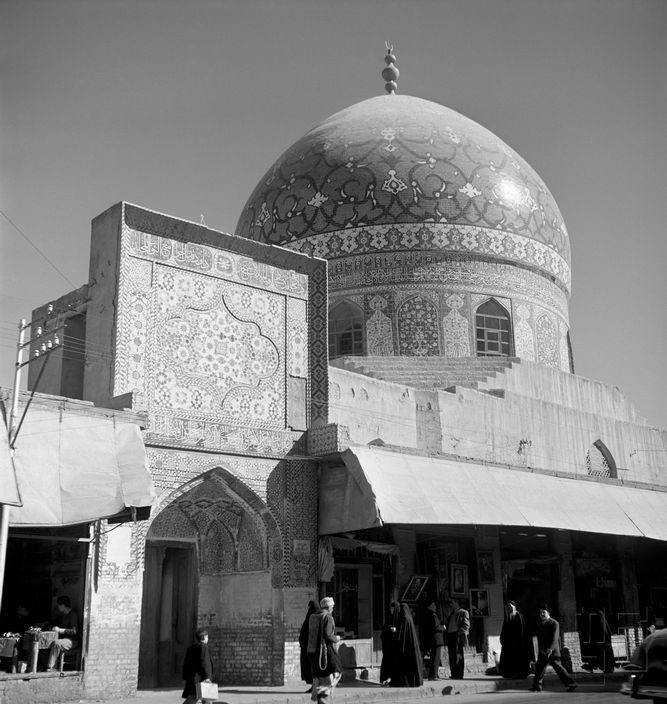
The Haydar-Khana Mosque where al-Jawahiri read his poem "My Brother Ja'far" to an audience of Iraqis.

Al-Jawahiri played a big role in demonstrations against the 1948 Anglo-Iraqi treaty signed by the Salih Jabr government. However, his brother, Ja'far, was killed during the al-Wathbah uprising of 1948 on al-Ma'mun Bridge, which inspired one of his most famous poems, "My Brother Ja'far." Al-Jawahiri was touched by the event and he would famously recite the poem at the Haydar-Khana Mosque to an audience of Muslims, and Jews forty days after his brother's funeral. A verse from the poem, "Do you know or do you not know / that the wounds of victims are a mouth?" became an icon of modern Iraqi poetry. Al-Jawahiri had also invited fellow Iraqi poet al-Sayyab to deliver a poem which also honored Ja'far.

In 1954 he decided to write a poem on the occasion of the coronation of King Faisal II, who reigned from 1953 until his murder in 1958, and his situation improved, although he was later to regret this step. After the monarchy was overthrown by the revolution of 1958, he was showered with honors by the new government, including being appointed. President of the Union of Iraqi Writers. Thus, al-Jawahiri was elected the first head of the Union of Iraqi Writers.

==== His poetry on Palestine ====
Before 1948, al-Jawahiri can be regarded as the most distinguished Arab writer on the Palestinian issue who paid great attention to the ongoing situations regarding Palestine, European imperialism, and Zionism. In a 1929 poem titled "Bleeding Palestine", he wrote:

أكلما عصفت بالشعب عاصفة هوجاء نستصرخ القرطاس و القلما هل أنقذ الشام كتاب بما كتبوا أو شاعر صان بغدادا بما نظما

Why is it whenever a violent storm shakes us thoroughly we resort to pen and paper?
Did the writers or the poets rescue Sham [Syria] or Baghdad by their writings?

In these lines, al-Jawahiri conveys to the reader that only forceful action can be useful and relied on by the people to fight against the British Empire and France. Arguing that speeches without action are useless, a common trait found in his writings. Al-Jawahiri continues by saying:

بالمدفع استشهدي إن كنت ناطقة او رمت ان تسمعي من يشتكي الصمما
سلى الحوادث و التاريخ هل عرفا حقا ررأيا بغير القوة احترما

Let the cannon testify to your words when speaking or if you want your words to reach the deaf
Ask history and its events; has it ever seen any right unprotected by force respected?

The second criticism that the poet conveyed through these lines centers around the Arabs relying on British and French support and their complete trust in them. Who would later support Zionism and create the state of Israel.

== Relations with the Republic of Iraq ==
As a result of constant harassment by the police due to his harsh criticism of Nuri al-Said's policies, he left for Syria in 1956 as a self-inflicted exile. He would return to Iraq in 1958 and would at first welcome the 14 July Revolution, which was led by Abd al-Karim Qasim and toppled the monarchy. By this time, a volume of al-Jawahiri's Diwan was published in Damascus in 1957 and Najaf in 1959 to celebrate Qasim's revolution. However, he would soon start to edit his last newspaper that was the leftist al-Ra'i al-'Am (The Public Opinion) which was characterized by its opposition towards Qasim's rule which was described as "authoritarian."

After the Ramadan Revolution in 1963, the Iraqi government withdrew Iraqi citizenship from al-Jawahiri due to his rejection of the coup led by Abd al-Salam Arif. He returned to Iraq after the 17 July Revolution of 1968 at the invitation of the Iraqi government which restored Iraqi citizenship to him and provided him with a retirement salary of around 150 dinars every month. 1980 he left Iraq to settle in Damascus. Some sources state that al-Jawahiri moved to Syria in 1983 in response to an official invitation. Other sources state that al-Jawahiri lived in Czechoslovakia in 1980 AD. Al-Jassani, who is al-Jawahiri’s nephew, says that he spent 30 years in Czechoslovakia after his first political crisis with the Iraqi government, and at the end of his life he moved between it and Damascus from time to time. In the 1990s, his Iraqi citizenship was withdrawn from him again due to his participation in the annual al-Jenadriyah Festival held in Saudi Arabia in 1994.

Al-Jawahiri had divided his life between living in either Prague and Damascus with short stays in Iraq. But al-Jawahiri never continued his patronage or involvement with the political or literary classes. Al-Jawahiri thought the Ba'ath Party suffered from legitimacy. Despite this, he was reportedly friendly with then-Ba'athist official and poet Salih Mahdi Ammash. He would also show some support for the leaderships of al-Bakr and Saddam Hussein, especially during their relations in the National Progressive Front. Al-Jawahiri would later state in an interview with the London-based Arabic newspaper Asharq al-Awsat in November 1991 that he was nostalgic for the days of the Kingdom of Iraq, which he recalled as days of freedom compared to what came after, which is shared among many Iraqi literary figures.

== Personal life ==
Al-Jawahiri, despite his conservative upbringing, was not particularly a very religious man. As a poet, he was described as someone who had "no roots in the Ottoman period" and, or the mix of Turkish, Persian, and Arabic literature which was common in the Ottoman Empire. Due to being a member of the Iraqi Communist Party as early as his early 30s, he was a communist but did not subscribe to ideas of pan-Arabism. His poems were also very critical of the Western world, which is one of the reasons why they were never translated into English.

Al-Jawahiri loved various poets such as al-Mutanabbi, and al-Ma'arri. He had most of al-Buhturi's poems memorized by heart. Being a traditionalist, he often liked to take inspiration and imitate the works of Ibn al-Khatib which can be seen in his first volume of the Diwan.

=== Al-Jawahiri's hat ===
The hat that al-Jawahiri always wore sparked controversy and attracted attention. According to an interview with his daughter, Khayal al-Jawahiri, conducted by Al-Jazeera: “My father caught a cold while attending a literary conference in the former Soviet Union, so doctors advised him to wear a head covering due to an allergy in his head. A velvet hat on display in the hospital shop caught his eye, so he put it on. From then on, it stayed with him until his death, and he never took it off, not even while sleeping." His daughter adds that she still keeps a number of these hats that were gifted to her father from Uzbekistan and Azerbaijan.

== Death and burial ==
Al-Jawahiri died at dawn on Sunday, 27 July 1997 AD in a hospital in the Syrian capital, Damascus, and his funeral was attended by the political and military officials of the state, in addition to a large popular presence. Al-Jawahiri was buried in the al-Ghuraba'a cemetery in the Sayyida Zeinab area in Damascus next to the grave of his wife, Amna al-Jawahiri. On his grave, a map of Iraq was carved from granite with the inscription “He rests here far from the Tigris of Goodness,” about one of his poems.

== Legacy ==
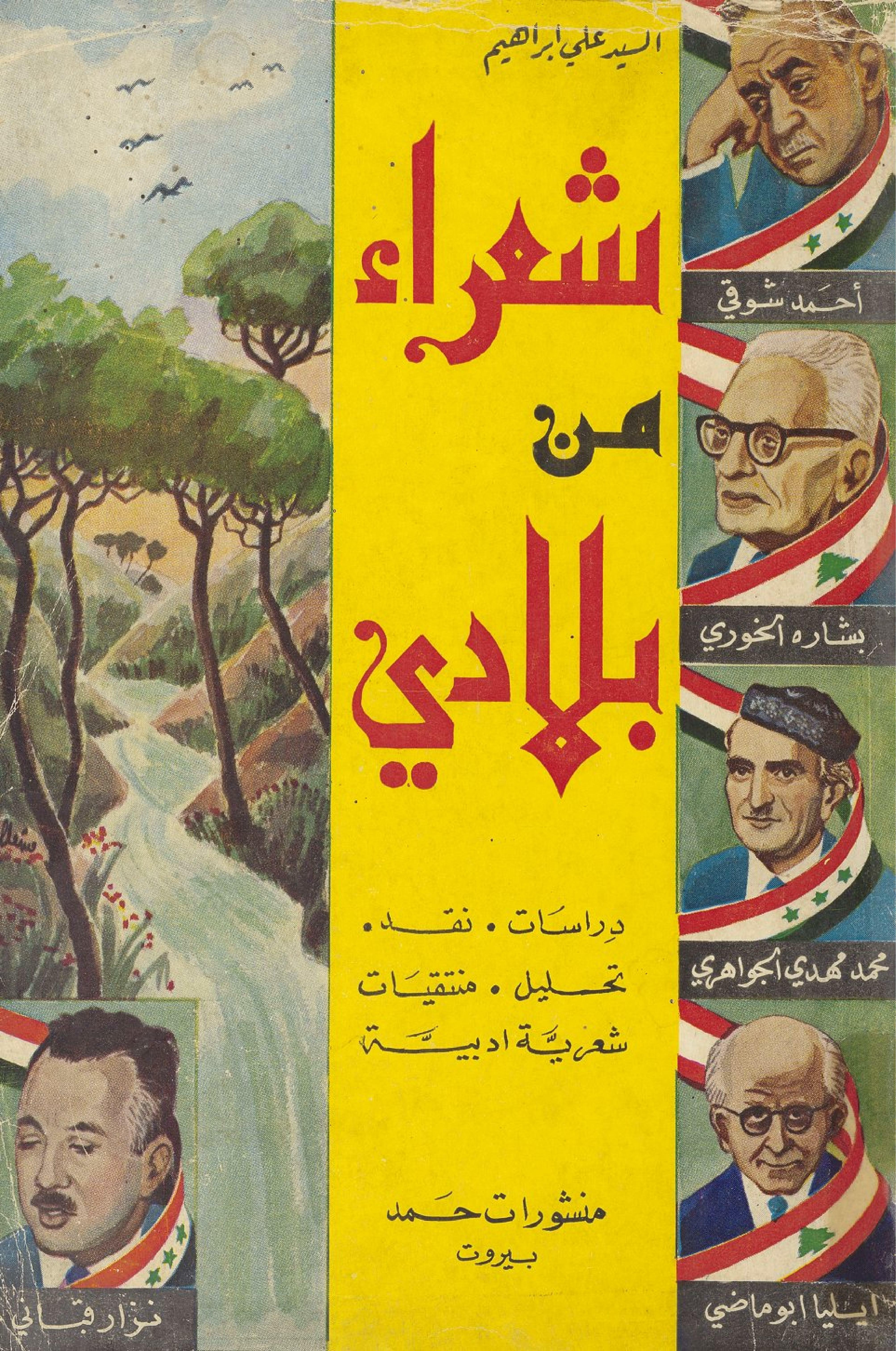
Al-Jawahiri as seen on the cover of the 1967 book "Shu'ara min Bilad" (Poets from my lands) by Ibrahim Ali, which focuses on several significant Middle Eastern poets.

Due to his skilled talent and keen patriotism, al-Jawahiri gained great recognition both among literary critics and the widest layers of Iraqi society. His work was noted for responding to the demands of the Iraqi audience for poetry that was engaged and at the same time continued old Arab literary traditions. For this reason, al-Jawahiri is considered to be "the last great classicist of the traditional school." Additionally, after listening to al-Jawahiri's poetry, Egyptian writer Taha Hussein held al-Jawahiri's work to be "the height of the Arabic literary heritage."

His works has been noted to have a significant use of rhetorical usages, allusions, and other Arabic literary devices that made it hard to translate his work into other languages. During his lifetime, al-Jawahiri was known by many public titles and nicknames such as "Emir of Poets" and "The Great Jewel."

In 2022, the house of al-Jawahiri, built in 1971 and located in al-Qādisīyah district of Baghdad, was renovated to become a cultural museum dedicated to the poet and his career. It may also become a center where cultural seminars, poetry and literary sessions, and painting exhibitions will be held. Former Iraqi prime minister, who visited the museum in honor of the poet, Mustafa al-Kadhim said “The government is keen to sponsor culture and to evoke the vivid biographies of Iraqi innovators, and their intellectual and cultural achievements” in a statement given to Iraqi News. That same year, plans to build a statue dedicated to the poet in Baghdad near the Tigris river were discussed.

On January 2, 2024, the Iraqi government initiated a construction project to develop a new residential city named “Al-Jawahiri City” west of Baghdad with “30,000 housing units spread across more than 17.8 million m2”.

== See also ==
- Iraqi art
- List of Iraqi artists
