= Union of Iraqi Writers =

- The General Union for the Literaries and Writers in Iraq
- الاتحاد العام للأدباء والكتاب في العراق
- Founded: 7 May 1959
- Headquarters: Baghdad
- Affiliations: professional
- Website: www.iraqiwritersunion.com

Union of Iraqi Writers or officially The General Union for the Literaries and Writers in Iraq (Arabic: الاتحاد العام للأدباء والكتاب في العراق) is a nonprofit professional cultural NGO that is concerned with Iraqi literary affairs. Founded in 1959 in Baghdad under Iraqi Republic (1958–68) and headquartered in Andalus Square in Baghdad and has branches in the provinces.

== Establishment ==
On 7 of May 1959, the first administrative body of Union elected by secret ballot; Jawahiri elected president by acclamation, and Salah Khalis as general secretary and members: Zul Nun Ayoub, Mohammed Saleh Bahr al-Ulum, Mahdi Makhzoumi and Abd al-Wahhab Al-Bayati, Ali Jawad al-Tahir (who became secretary general after the assignment of Dr. Khalis to work outside Iraq) and Lamia Abbas Amara and Yousef al-Ani and Saadi Yousef and Abdullah Goran and Abdul Malik Nuri and Abdul Majid al-Wendawi and Ali Jalil al-Wardi and the name of Abdul Hamid Hammoudi.

== Headquarters ==
The Union's headquarters is located in a building on the main street in Andalus Square in Baghdad. In the center of the building's courtyard is a huge portrait of the Iraqi poet Muhammad Mahdi al-Jawahiri. In addition to the Union's administration rooms, the building includes a lecture hall decorated with pictures of prominent contemporary Iraqi poets such as Badr Shaker al-Siyab, Ma'ruf al-Rusafi, Jamil Sidqi al-Zahawi and others, and a library full of titles despite the theft of many of its contents during the fall of Baghdad (2003). The Union building was attacked on the evening of June 17, 2015, by “an armed group dressed in black and carrying machine guns and light weapons.”

== General Secretaries ==
- 1959 - 1980 : Muhammad Mahdi al-Jawahiri.
- 1980 - 1986: Hamid Said Hadi.
- 2003 - May 13, 2016: Alfred Semaan Al-Maqdisi.
- 13 May 2016 - 28 August 2019: Ibrahim Al-Khayat.
