= Buland al-Haydari =

- Born: September 26, 1926; Baghdad, Kingdom of Iraq
- Died: August 6, 1996; London, United Kingdom
- Citizenship: Iraq
- Occupations: writer, poet
- Family: al-Haydari

Buland al-Haydari (1926–1996) was an Iraqi poet. His father was an officer in the army, and his mother was Fatima bint Ibrahim Effendi al-Haydari, who held the position of Sheikh al-Arab in Istanbul. He was born in Baghdad on September 26, 1926, and he published his first diwan in 1946. He died in London on August 6, 1996, following unsuccessful heart surgery. He was a Feyli Kurdish, and his brother was a poet.
