= Al-Rashid Street, Baghdad =

Historic avenue in Baghdad, Iraq

Coordinates: 33°20′34″N 44°23′19″E

Al-Rashid Street
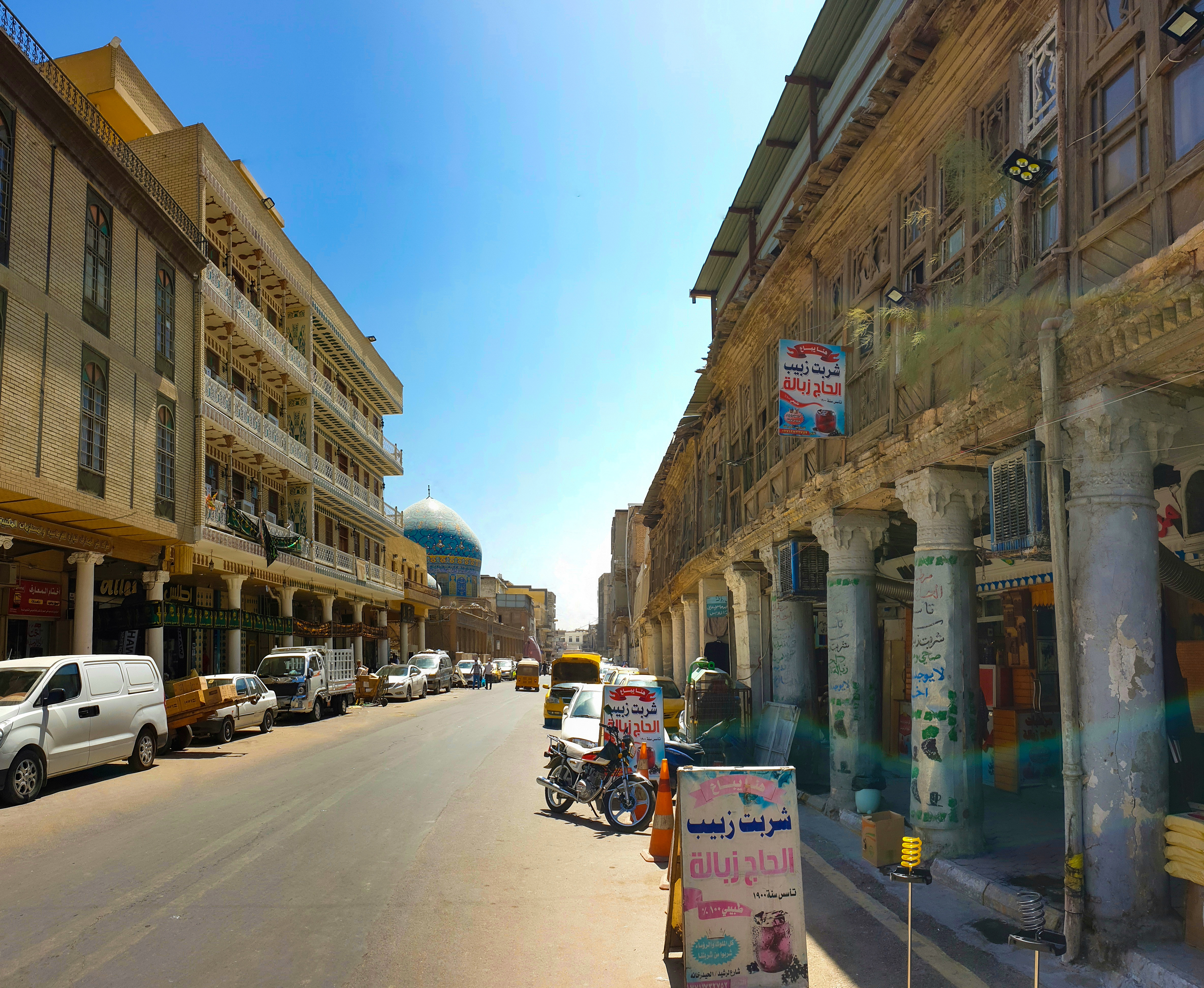
- Native name: Arabic: شارع الرشيد
- Former names: Halil Pasha Avenue C. Hindenburg Street; Al-Nasr Street
- Part of: Old Baghdad
- Location: Baghdad, Iraq

Other
- Known for: 1. Various Baghdadi Cafés; 2. Haydar-Khana Mosque; 3. Mirjan Mosque; 4. Artistic and cultural influence 5. Al-Zawra'a Cinema; 6. Architectural style
- Status: Active

Al-Rashid Street (Arabic: شارع الرشيد, romanized: Shari' al-Rashīd) is one of the main avenues in downtown Baghdad, Iraq. Named after Abbasid Caliph Harun al-Rashid, it is one of the most significant landmarks of the city due to its political, spiritual, urban, and cultural history. Opened from al-Maidan Square, the boulevard is considered an important urban heritage site of Baghdad and bears witness to what Iraq has gone through in terms of political events, intellectual stature, and commercial success that Iraq saw over more than a century, as well as being a tourist attraction. The avenue includes many historic landmarks such as Haydar-Khana Mosque, the Mirjan Mosque, al-Zahawi Café, and Souk al-Haraj.

Historically, the street has gone by many names. Al-Rashid Street became recognized as a symbol of the transformation of Baghdad due to the many changes the city has seen through the last century. The street has been compared to various notable streets around the world such as the Champs-Élysées in Paris, the Muhammad Ali Street in Cairo, and the Hamra Street in Beirut due to their artistic, historic, and influential significance. The street has also been suggested to be enlisted on UNESCO's World Heritage Site due to its history and significance and many efforts were done to get it enlisted and was observed as the main historic avenue and commerce area of Baghdad in the past and its area was compared to the Rive Gauche in Paris.

In recent years, the avenue has been recognized as the heart of Baghdad and nicknamed "Baghdad's living memory" due to its significance.

== Name ==
The street names were changed several times such as "Hindenburg Street" a name used by the British and then later "al-Nasr Street". It was until the name settled on its current name in 1936, which was launched by the Iraqi linguist and historian Mustafa Jawad after Abbasid Caliph Harun al-Rashid. The name "Al-Rashid" (Arabic: الرشيد) was an honorific title given to the Abbasid Caliph which meant "followers of the right path."

== Historical background ==
=== Early establishment ===
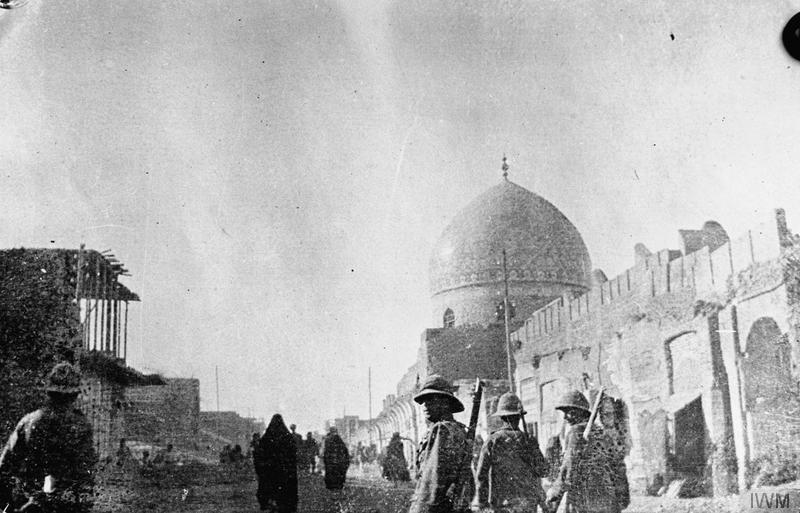
The street during World War I.

Before the establishment of the street, the areas around the current street held several significant positions. These include localities in which Christians lived, especially near the St. Joseph Latin Cathedral which was built in 1866 located near the current street, silversmith shops that the Baghdadi Sabian-Mandaeans community operated, the shrine of Ibn Ruh al-Nawbakhti, the souks of al-Shorja, the ancient Sayyid Sultan Ali Mosque, several Abbasid Era commercial centers, the Khan Mirjan for merchants, the old Mirjan Mosque, several coffeehouses, and the Haydar-Khana Mosque. One of the localities, the Sababikh al-A'al locality, was also the home of several foreign missionaries such as the first French consul to Baghdad, followed by the American consul, and the directors of several British companies.

The street's origin dates back to the late Ottoman Empire period. Between 1915 and 1917, the demolition of around 700 houses took place to pave the way for the road. The demolishing was carried out by a group of German military engineers, Germany being the main ally of the Ottomans during World War I, and was named "Halil Pasha Street" after Ottoman army general Halil Pasha who was governor of Baghdad at the time. The avenue was opened in 1914 by the Ottoman administration as a modern avenue for transportation and to expand trade. Because the narrow road networks that were common in Iraq at the time didn't suit carriages or transportation, the street was wider with sidewalks that included arcades that acted as shading for pedestrians. The street would later be expanded along the older parts of Baghdad and was always kept parallel to the Tigris River.

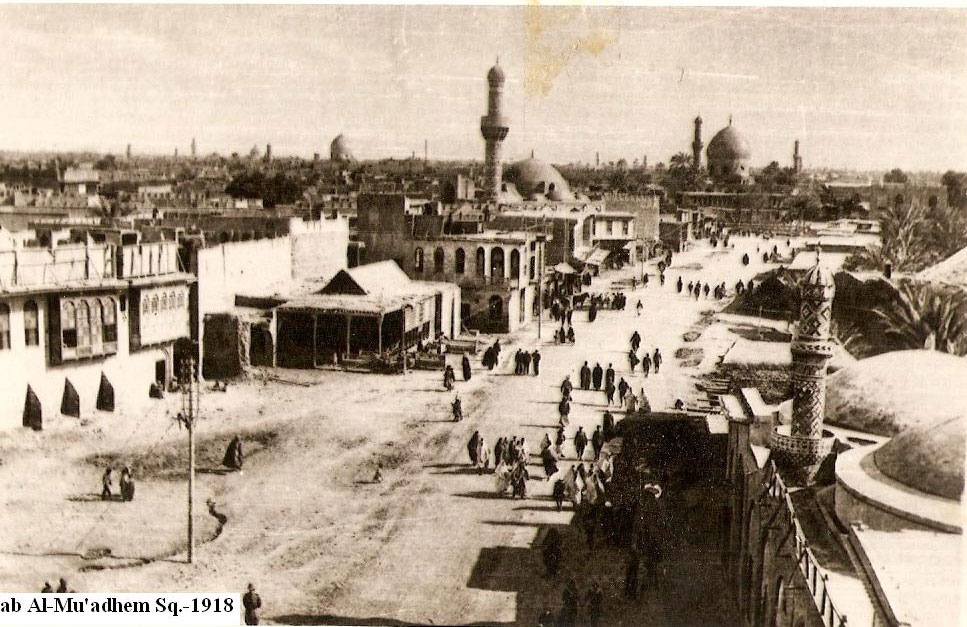
An early stage of the street as seen from the gate of Bab al-Mu'adham in 1918.

The road was originally paved to coumarate the Siege of Kut. However, the street's gull construction was completed once the British Empire took over Iraq and was wide enough for vehicles to pass through. The street became shaded by hanging balconies which were held by arcades. During the British colonialist rule of Iraq, the Haydar-Khana Mosque, a mosque located on the street, started to become one of the brewing aspects of the Iraqi Revolt due to how frequent the notables and personalities of the city gathered in opposition to the British. British troops reportedly stormed the mosque in an attempt to arrest the revolutionaries. One instance, the Haydar-Khana Mosque saw several anti-British meetings by Iraqi Muslims and prominent Iraqi figures. On 23 May 1920, the mosque was one of the many mosques where mawlid was held. A speech was given by young Iraqis, including Mullah 'Uthman al-Mawsili, in favor of expelling the British. In response, British forces exiled al-Mawsili to Basra. Iraqis on the street responded by closing shops on the road and protesting, calling for a national government. This led the British forces to block the road and close it. They would then surge the mosque using an armored car, at least one person was reported to have been killed during this event which was a deaf-mute who got run over after getting his foot stuck. Even after the independence of the Kingdom of Iraq, the area stayed as a hot spot for revolutionary gatherings.

=== Flourishing during the Kingdom of Iraq ===
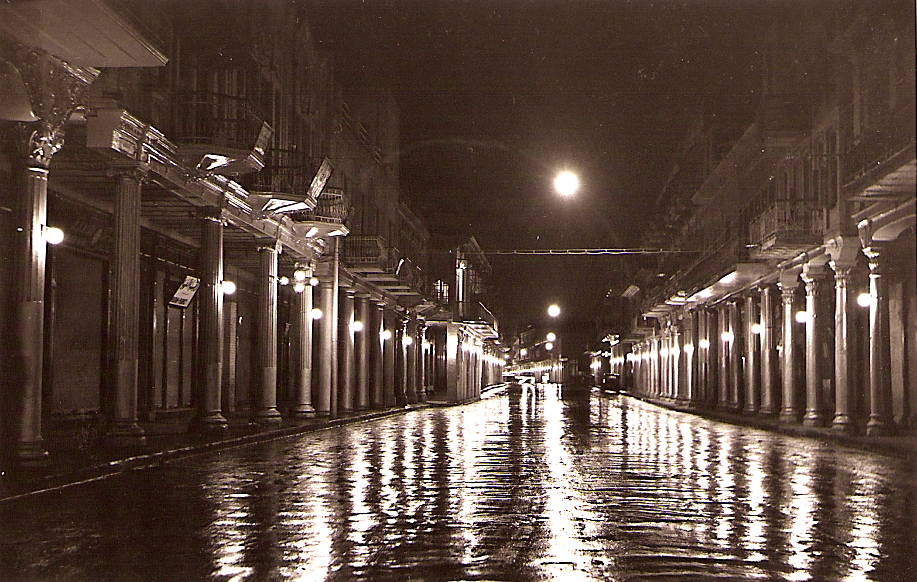
Al-Rashid Street in 1942.

Al-Rashid Street became home to many political and cultural events and establishments. As well as Baghdad's most famous coffeehouses, restaurants, and markets. Coffeehouses such as ones themed after Egyptian singer Umm Kulthum and the al-Zahawi Café. This caused artists, students, and intellectuals to visit the avenue commonly. Due to this, al-Rashid Street became the main street for the coffeehouse culture of Baghdad, alongside Abu Nuwas Street. Throughout the decades, literary coffeehouses started to be established and were inhabited by all generations. Some coffeehouses started to be associated with the big three Neo-Classical Iraqi poets al-Zahawi, al-Rusafi, and al-Jawahiri, who met with several younger poets in the cultural coffeehouses. Al-Rashid Street was also connected to al-Mutanabbi Street which played a role in exposing readers to old and new Arabic knowledge alongside translated global knowledge. Many newly established printers were established on that street.

Examples of prominent coffeehouses on the avenue were the Arif Agha Café, which was inhabited by al-Rusafi, al-Zahawi Café, which was famous for its literary battles between al-Zahawi and al-Rusafi, and Hasan 'Ajami Café, which was inhabited by al-Jawahiri and was also his favorite. The Hassan 'Ajami Café was also located next to the Shamash School for Iraqi Jews, as well as the Hajj Zabala Juice Bar and al-Sayyid's Cakes that was located in front of the former. Other coffeehouses that were on the street were the Parliament Café, which al-Jawahiri also visited frequently, and the Brazilian Café which was the home to the modern Iraqi literary movement, and was where Iraqi painter Jawad Saleem claimed he learned the use of color from. The Brazilian Café, alongside another nearby Coffeehouse named the Swiss Café, was unique compared to the coffeehouses due to their European items and theme. The coffeehouses also saw political activities such as gatherings in protest against the Anglo-Iraqi Treaty of 1948, which were held in the Hassan 'Ajami Café.

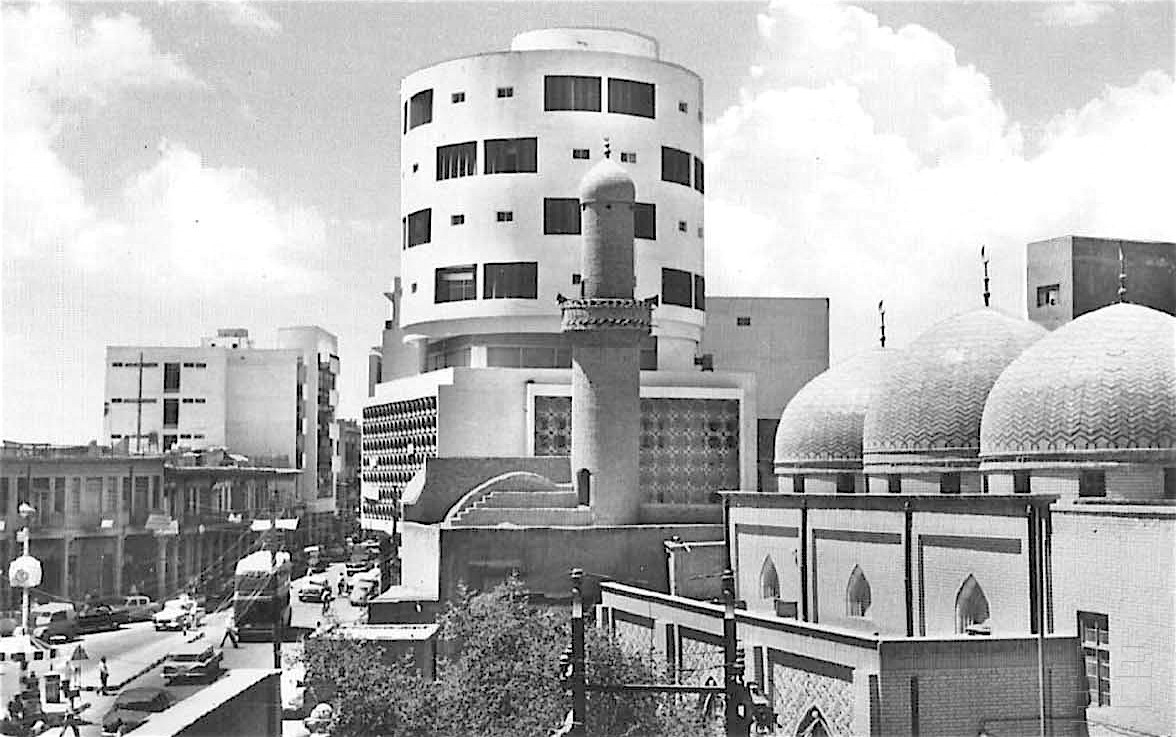
The Mirjan Mosque and the newly constructed Abboud Building on the street during the 1960s.

Around the 1930s, many cinemas and theaters such as al-Rashid Cinema, al-Zawra'a Cinema, and Roxy Cinema started to be established on al-Rashid Street. The cinemas were divided between summer and winter theaters and showed Flash Gordon, Fox Film, and Metro-Goldwyn-Mayer films. Cinemas played a major role in Iraqi society, and Baghdadi cinemas used to distribute weekly advertisements for movies in Arabic and English. At the time, going to cinemas was a weekly event for the working and the middle class. Thursday became the traditional day of the week when Baghdadi families went to theatres and acted as a break day for students. Around the mid-1950s, many cinemas in Bab al-Sharqi area started demolishing.

During the 1950s, the street saw a flourishing in commercial and financial centers which also spread to the nearby street called "Al-Samaw'al Street" which became known for its financial pulse and role in the Baghdadi stock exchange at the time. This street area contained the main al-Rafidain Bank headquarters and other private commercial banks. Before 1948, many of the workers in these financial institutions were Iraqi Jews, Indians, and British people. Iraqi businessmen met with sellers in coffeehouses on al-Samu'al Street to complete sales and discuss purchasing bargains.

==== Visits from foreign celebrities ====
One of the most influential figures to visit Iraq during the Royal era was the Egyptian singer Umm Kulthum. She hosted several concerts around al-Rashid Street's theaters. Most notably the al-Hilal Theater which Umm Kulthum visited in 1932 with a welcoming poem recited by al-Rusafi. Al-Istiqlal newspaper published an article about the visit entitled “The Magic of Babylon and Pharaohs at the al-Hilal Nightclub" in which it documented that starting from 18 October 1932, Umm Kulthum hosted eight concerts in the theater. Umm Kulthum's popular song "Baghdad, O' Castle of Lions" would be broadcast daily for decades until 2003 in the wake of the US invasion of Iraq. Due to Umm Kulthum's popularity, coffeehouses themed after her were established and visited by her Iraqi fans.

Another well-known figure to visit Baghdad was Indian Bengali poet and philosopher Rabindranath Tagore in 1932 who also visited al-Zahawi Café and met with the Iraqi poet that the coffeehouse takes its name. Another celebrity who also visited the street was the Syrian-Egyptian singer Fayza Ahmed who, just like Umm Kulthum, held concerts in several theaters.

=== During the Republic of Iraq ===
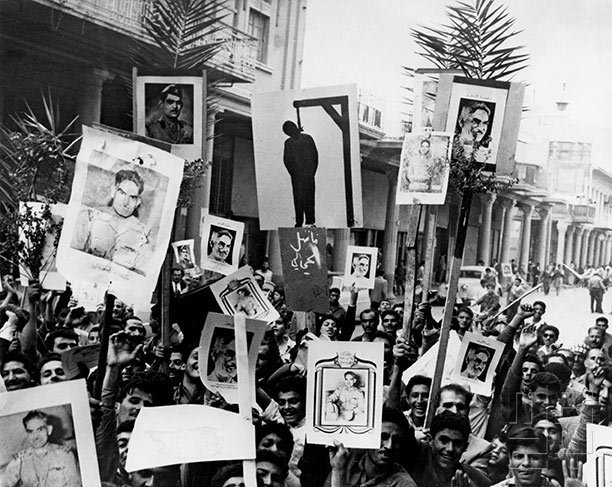
A crowd on the street supporting Abd al-Karim Qasim while calling for the death of former prime minister Fadhel al-Jamali, 8 December 1958

During the 14 July Revolution, the 1958 military coup that overthrew the Iraqi Monarchy, the Crown Prince Abd al-Ilah's corpse was dragged along the street and then cut to pieces. That day, the street was full of demonstrations and marches. During the afternoon of that same day, many bodies were dragged into the street including the body of a Jordanian delegation from the Hashemite Federal Parliament who happened to be on a visit to Iraq was dragged through the area with a stick being shoved into his bottom while the crowded shouted for the capture of Muhammad Fadhel al-Jamali, the former-Iraqi Minister of Foreign Affairs. Iraq and Jordan were united into the Arab Federation at the time. It was also around this time Iraqi photographer Latif al-Ani started to take pictures of the daily life at the street.

The following year after the overthrow, on 7 October 1959 Iraqi Republican leader Abd al-Karim Qasim, who led the revolt that overthrew the Monarchy, narrowly avoided death in a botched assassination attempt during a residential motorcade on the avenue. The assassination attempt was planned out by the regional leadership of the early Ba'ath Party. A young Saddam Hussein participated in the assassination attempt. The plan was to have five of the perpetrators stand behind the pillars of the buildings on the street in front of the Brazilian Café and open fire on Qasim. Saddam would then emerge from the Umm Kulthum Café, which he sat in, and then shoot Qasim. The leader then jumped out of the car in time. Soldiers on the car reacted. While Qasim survived, his assistant, Qasim al-Janabi, was killed in the attack by one of the assassins. Saddam had also injured one of his legs in the attack. Seventy-eight members of the Ba'ath Party were arrested and put on trial. The Ba'ath would later gain enough support to overthrow Qasim.

By the beginning of the 1960s, al-Rashid Street started to lose a lot of European products of higher quality that were imported from outside countries and made the street's markets famous. Despite its loss, al-Rashid Street remained the living center of Baghdad throughout the 1960s and 1970s. Many of its libraries, restaurants, coffeehouses, and theaters still being active with a statue of al-Rusafi in the middle of the street.

Throughout the era of president Saddam Hussein, al-Rashid Street remained the main center of Baghdad despite some of the older buildings being worn out. The street became more busy with organized thoroughfare. The most notable and active parts of the avenue were the shops, coffeehouses, art museums, banks, schools, and the historic mosques located within the avenue. With the street still connecting to old Baghdadi suburbs that contain narrow alleyways.

20th century pictures of al-Rasheed Street

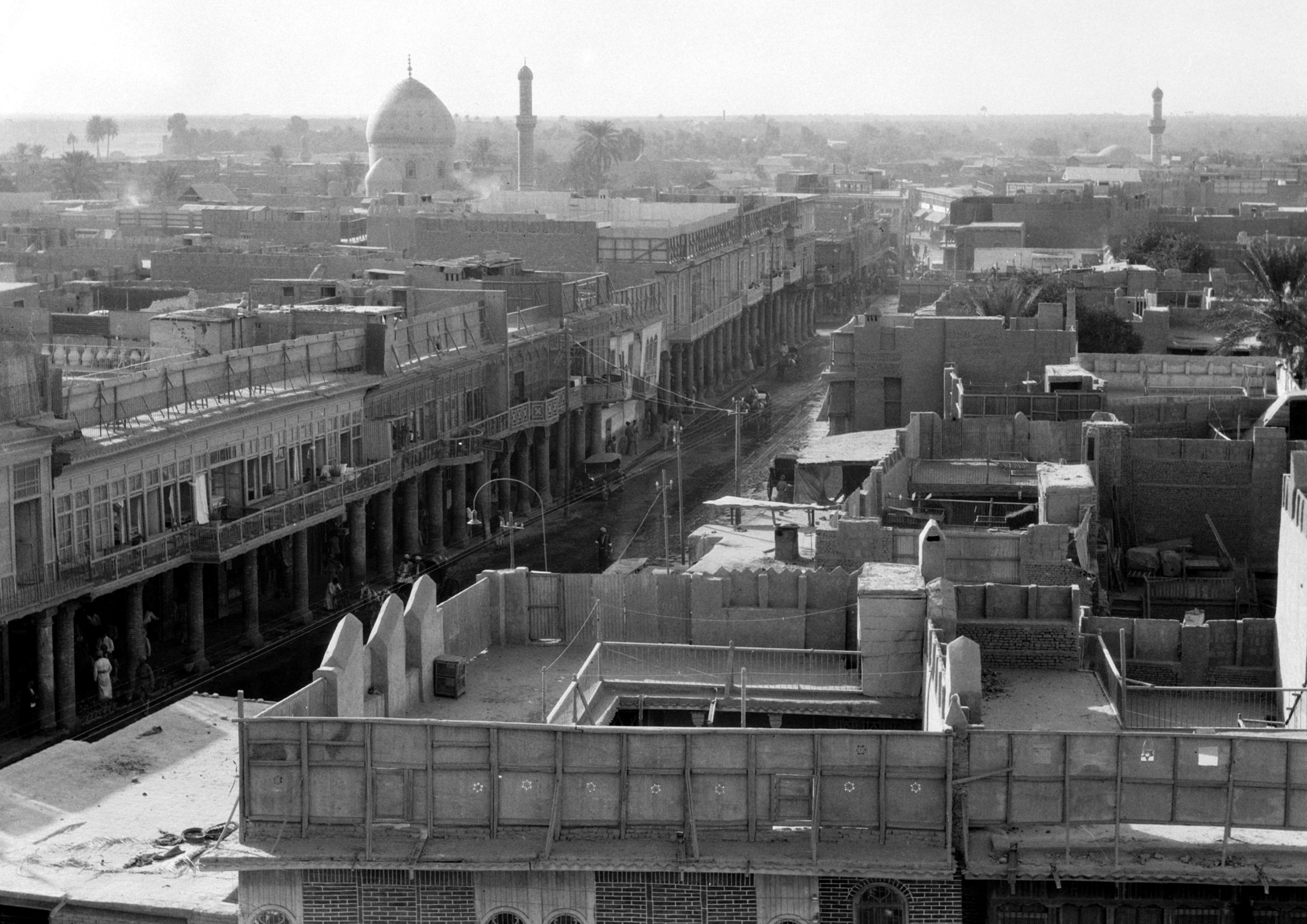
Al-Rashid Street and the Mosque-Madrasa of al-Ahmadiyya in 1932.

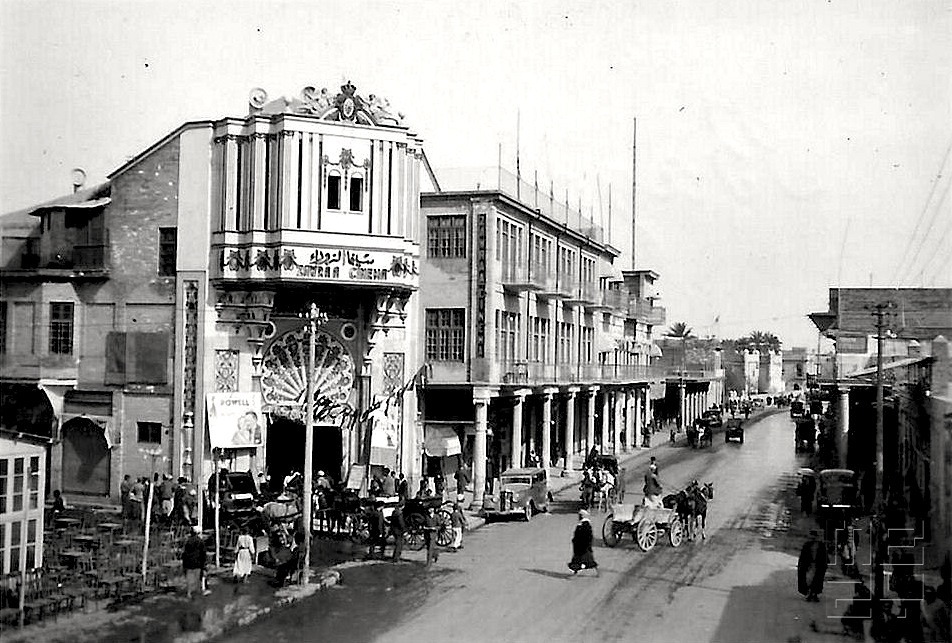
Al-Zawra'a Cinema in al-Rashid Street in 1942.

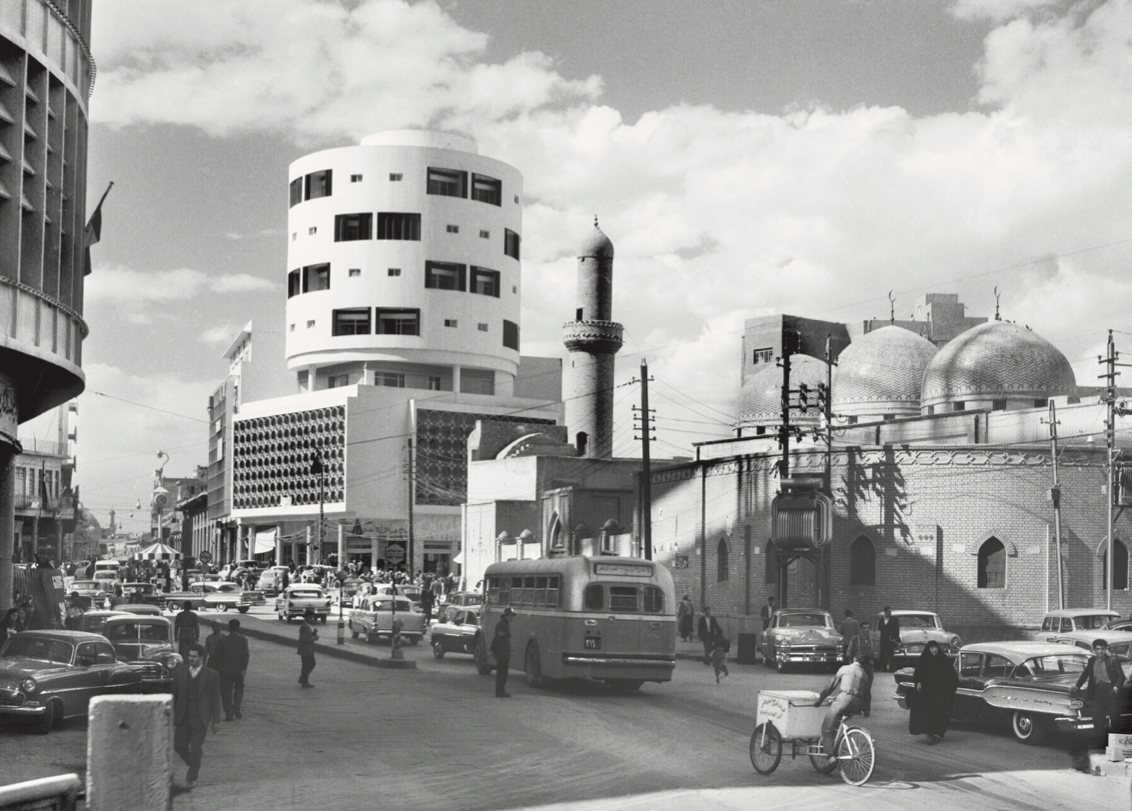
The Mirjan Mosque and the Abboud Building on the street by Latif al-Ani.

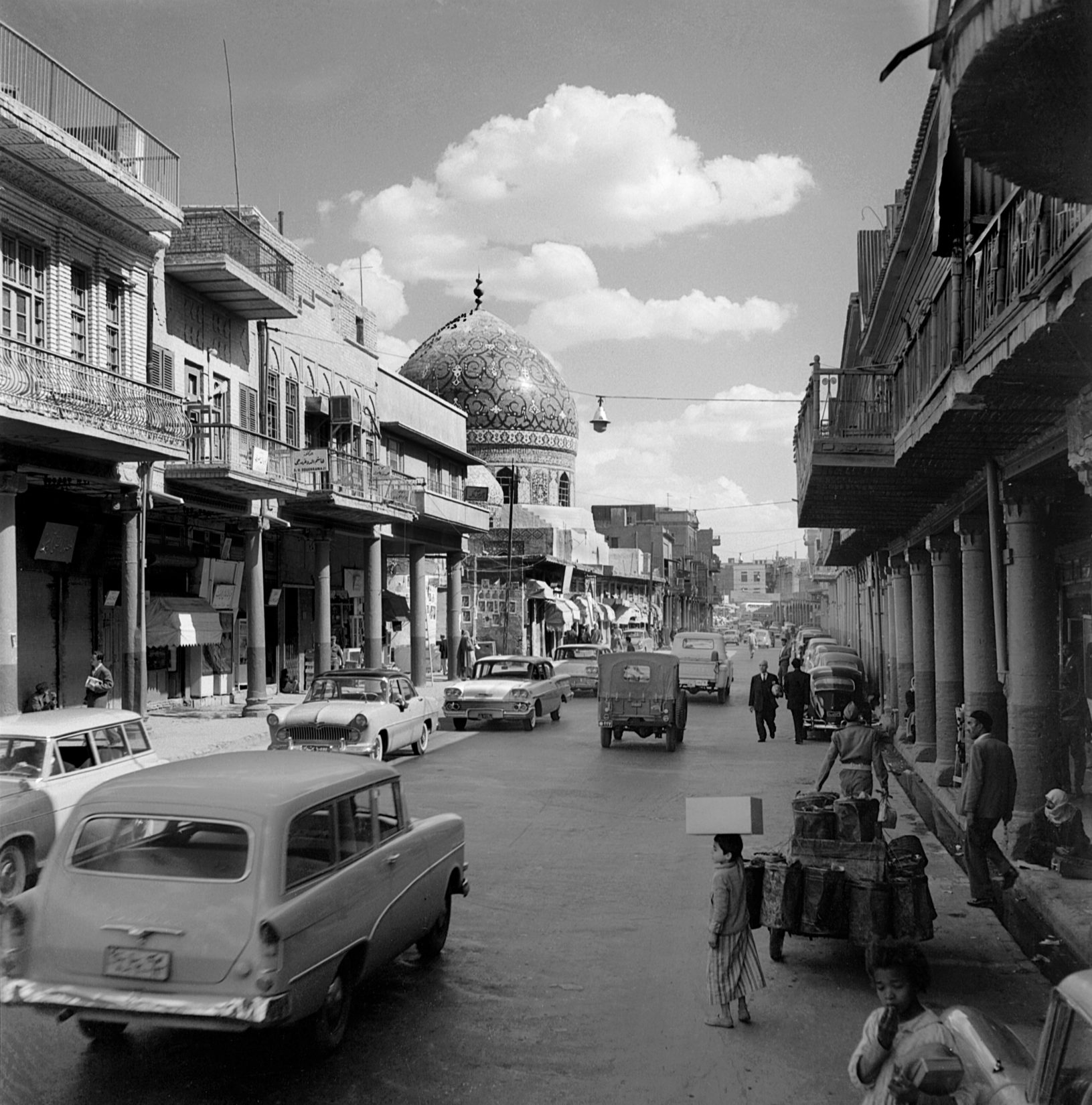
Al-Rashid Street in 1961 and the Haydar-Khana Mosque.

== Architecture ==
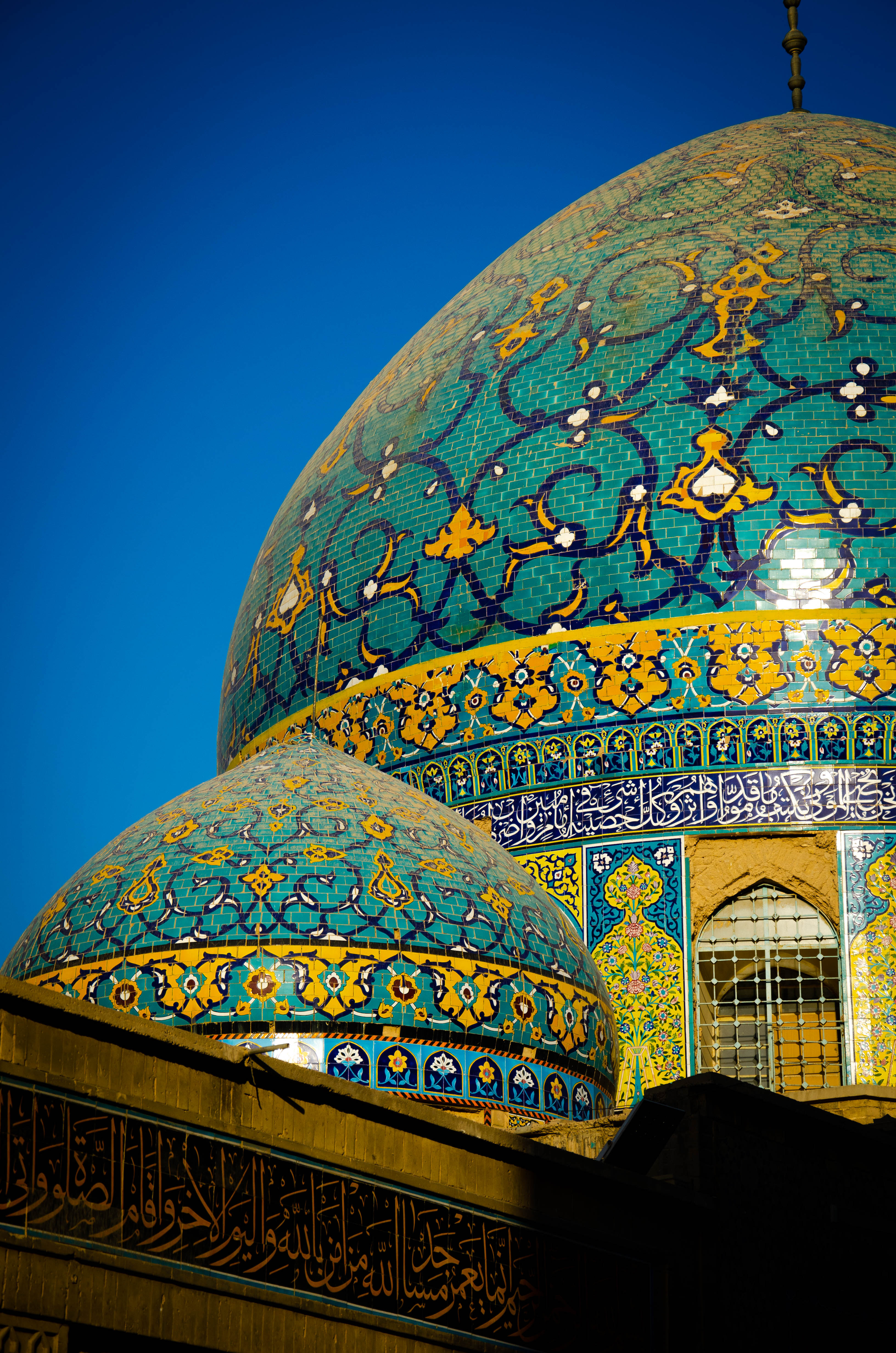
The arabesque domes of the Haydar-Khana Mosque.

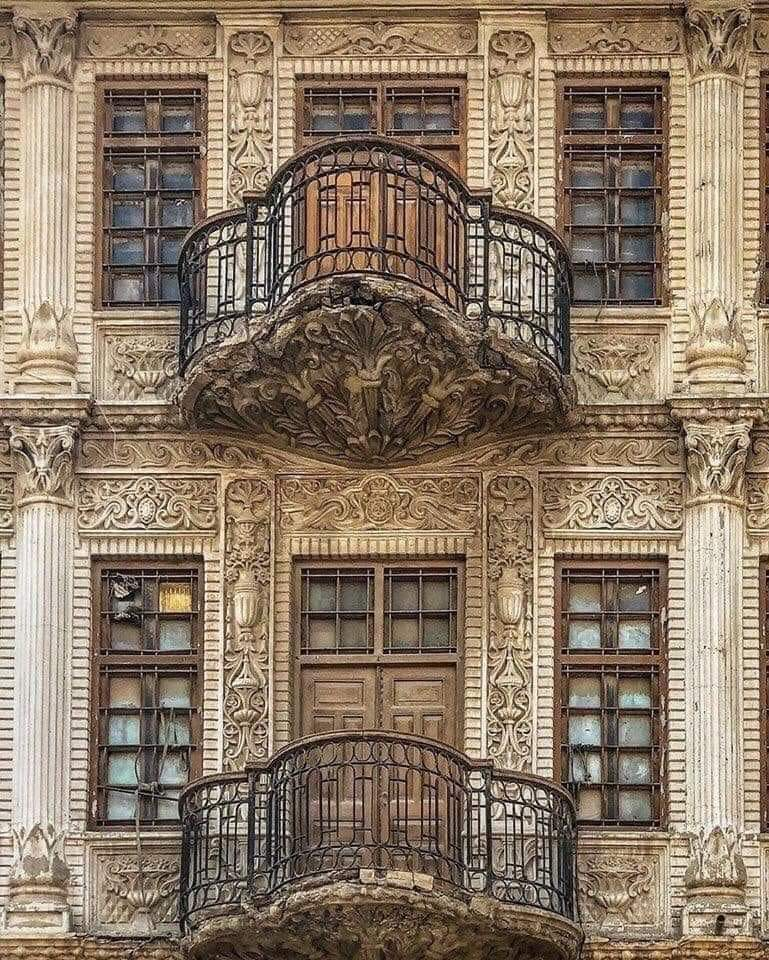
Decorative historic facade and balconies on Al-Rashid Street

Along the street are sidewalks which include arcades built to shade the pedestrians from the sun with three-story buildings along the avenue. Around 70% of the avenue is covered with these shaded arcades which gave al-Rashid Street a lot of its architectural character. These arcades are located on both sides of the avenue with each column is about five meters long and have diameters ranging from 38cm to 55cm and the width of the road not exceeding 12 meters between each side. However, the road isn't a straight line which was made to not demolish some heritage buildings such as the mosques despite the demolishing of the Mirjan Mosque's side walls to make way for the avenue. It is estimated that there are more than a thousand columns on the avenue although most of the buildings and arcades have fallen into neglect and despair after the 2003 US invasion of Iraq. The arcades hold several buildings, many of which are multi-leveled and include post-modernist colonial European, traditional Iraqi, and Renaissance architectural influence which was considered modern for its time. The old visual appearance of the avenue was supposed to convey a sense of harmony and formal unity to the average pedestrian.

Swiss architectural historian Stefano Bianca described parts of al-Rashid Street's architecture as being reminiscent of European colonial architecture due to the fact that the Ottoman Empire's architecture showed features of westernization in its last decades when it was establishing western-type municipalities since at least the 1870s in Syria and Iraq. He also noted the arcades of the street having Mediterranean influence although still keep some native traditional aspects persistent such as the height of the buildings.

Some of the houses on al-Rashid Street also include shanashil, an old Islamic balcony that was a common architectural feature to preserve privacy. Often made from carved and paneled wood, these shanashil can still be found around the street in the houses in narrow alleyways and have become part of Iraqi folklore.

== Notable landmarks and historical sites ==
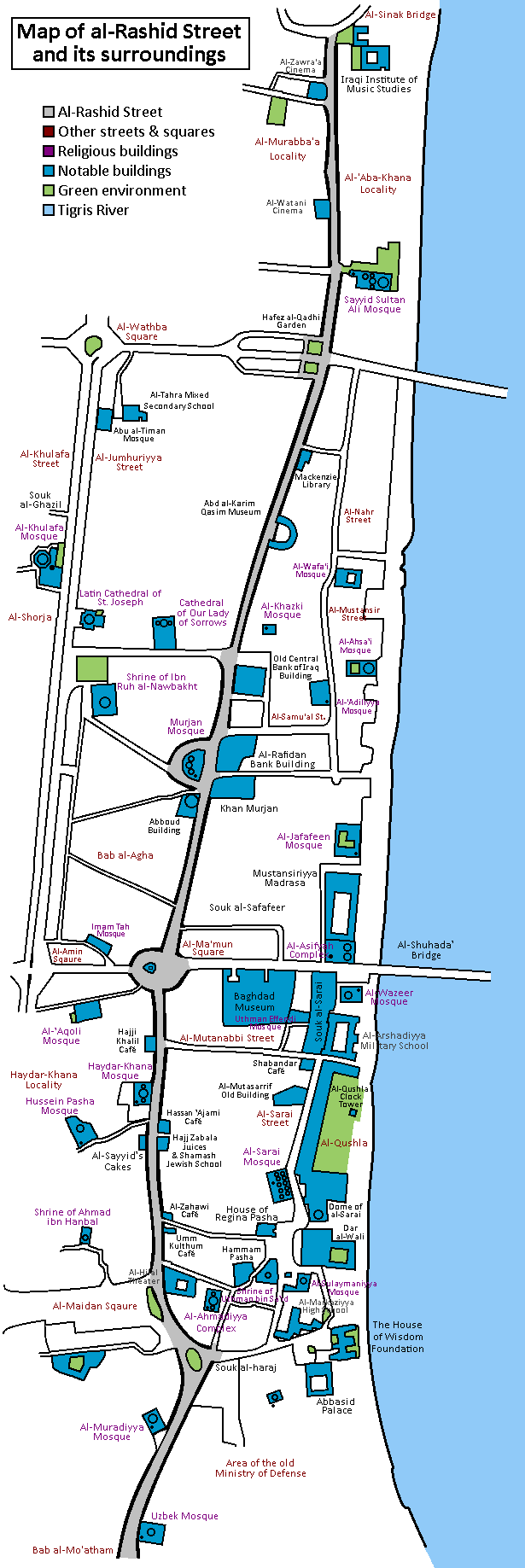
Map of al-Rashid Street and its surroundings.

Al-Rashid Street is usually divided into five distinctive sections as a result the many places it runs across: Al-Sinak, al-Murabba'a, al-Shorja souks, Haydar-Khana, and al-Maidan areas. As such, the avenue includes many notable landmarks and sights of interest throughout its existence, some dating back to before the construction of the street. These include:

=== Coffeehouses ===
Coffeehouses in Baghdad were considered social and intellectual houses for many social classes. As such, the city has an abundance of cafés and many are located on al-Rashid Street. These consist of al-Zahawi Café, al-Baladiyya Café, Shatt al-'Arab Café, Hassan 'Ajami Café, the Parliament Café, the Brazilian Café, Umm Kulthum Café, the Swiss Café, and many more. These include:

==== The Brazilian Café ====
Founded in the 1940s close to the Swiss Café, the Brazilian Café in the al-Murabba'a locality was frequented by writers, students, journalists, and intellectuals who were offered Turkish coffee mixed with Brazilian beans imported from Brazil.

==== Hajji Khalil Café ====
Founded in 1931 by a then-well-known Baghdadi Hajji named Khalil al-Qahwati, the Hajji Khalil Café was a coffeehouse that once existed in front of the gate of al-Mutanabbi Street that served free tea, sold famous Iraqi beverages, and attracted many Iraqis from all social classes. Those include military men, tribal sheikhs, Islamic sheikhs from Karbala and Najaf, the elderly, and students. But the coffeehouse was more well known for its owner, Khalil al-Qahwati, where people came for his company. The coffeehouse, alongside its owner, has also been featured in the 1957 Iraqi movie Saeed Effendi in a minor role.

==== Hassan 'Ajami Café ====
Founded by a man named Hassan al-'Ajami Chai-khana in 1917, the Hassan 'Ajami Café is one of the most well-known coffeehouses on the avenue located north of the Haydar-Khana Mosque. The coffeehouse was decorated with rare Russian samovars decorated with pictures of Russian tsars and official seals dating back to the 19th century. As well as tea flasks and hookah bottles. The walls were decorated with pictures of King Faisal I, King Ghazi, and Qajar Shahs. The coffeehouse declined after the 2003 US invasion and many of its decorations and items disappeared or were damaged.

==== The Swiss Café ====
Founded in the 1940s by a highborn Syrian man, the Swiss Café was a European-themed coffeehouse that offered Café au lait and cassata ice cream. Iraqi-Palestinian author and artist Jabra Ibrahim Jabra used to frequent this coffeehouse. The coffeehouse was more liberal and less traditional than all previous coffeehouses in Baghdad as it allowed women of all ages to enter and had Western music by composers such as Johannes Brahms and Tchaikovsky play in it for its patrons. Thus the coffeehouse became well known for playing classical music. Other than Jabra, Iraqi writers Abd al-Malik Nuri, Abd al-Wahhab al-Bayati, and Fu'ad al-Takarli were also known to frequent and have regular meetings in this coffeehouse to discuss several topics and issues.

==== Al-Zahawi Café ====
Established in 1917 and named after neo-classical Iraqi poet al-Zahawi, the coffeehouse is located near al-Maidan Square and behind the Haydar-Khana Mosque. The coffeehouse was frequented by many patrons and intellectual meetings. The coffeehouse was also famous for its literary battles between al-Zahawi and al-Rusafi.

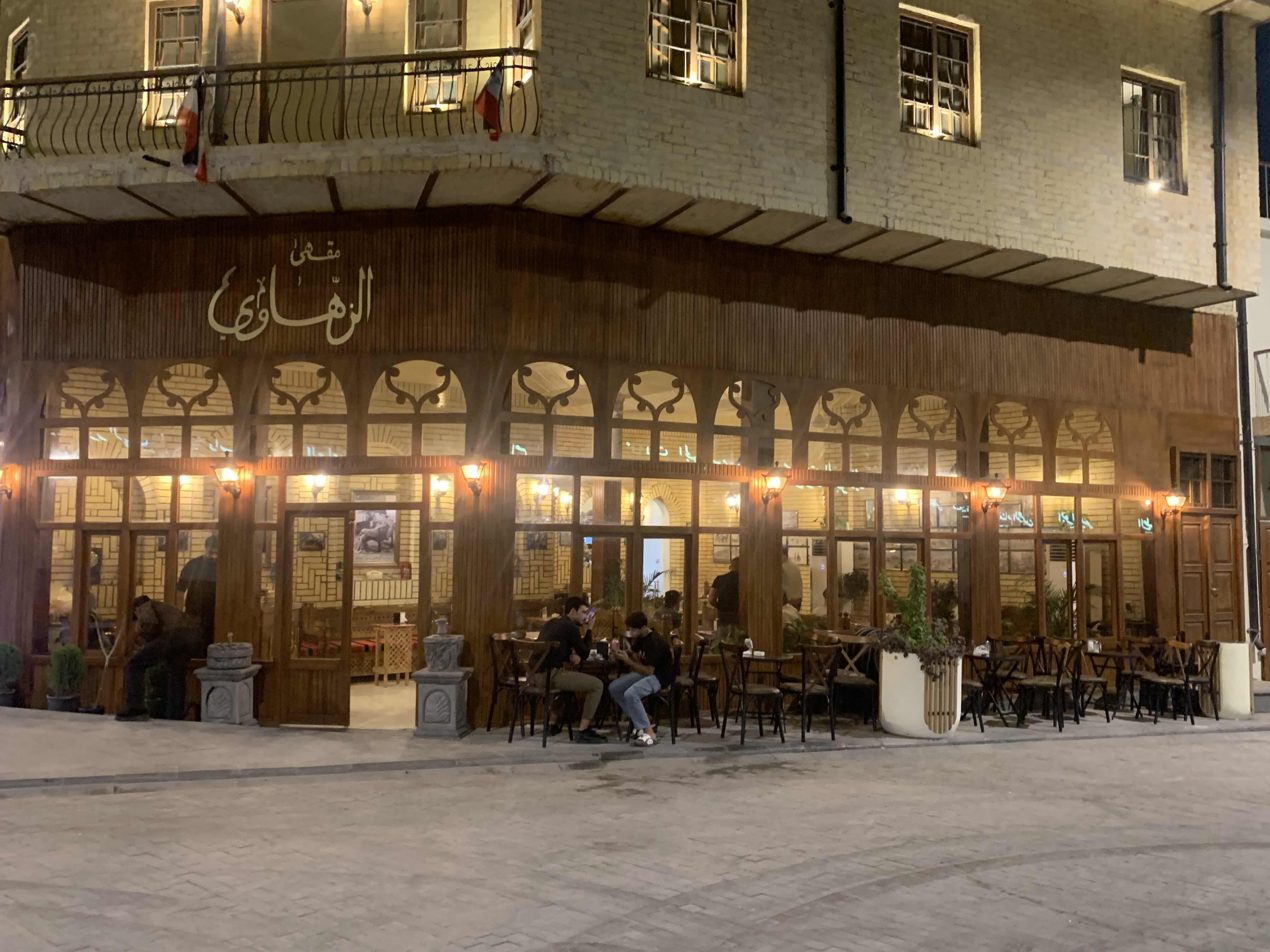
Al-Zahawi Coffeehouse in 2025

=== Places of worship ===
- Located in the center of the avenue opposite the Khan Mirjan, the Mirjan Mosque is an ancient mosque and madrasa that dates back to the Jalayirid Sultanate and was founded by Jalayirid politician Amin al-Din Mirjan. The complex was finished around 1357 and its madrasa contained Hanafi and Shafi'i studies. The mosque is also notable for its ornamental brickwork and inscriptions which include Kufic writing on its walls and prayer hall. During the early decades of al-Rashid Street's existence, parts of the mosque were demolished to expand the avenue despite backlash from Baghdadis and Gertrude Bell who recognized the mosque's heritage status. The mosque's prayer hall was rebuilt on the other side of the building. The entrance of the mosque, the original Kufic decorations, and the shrine of Murjan, which was located under the main dome, were preserved and moved.
- Located in the Haydar-Khana locality, the Haydar-Khana Mosque was built in its current form by the last Iraqi Mamluk Dawud Pasha in 1825 and is the largest mosque from the Ottoman period in Baghdad. The mosque is square with its southwestern wall facing al-Rashid Street, alongside two of its gates. Topped by a large arabesque dome and two other smaller domes surrounding it with its minaret located in the northeastern corner of the mosque. During the early days of the Iraqi state, the Haydar-Khana Mosque was a brewing area for Iraqi opposition movements and protests by, beginning with opposition against British imperial rule.
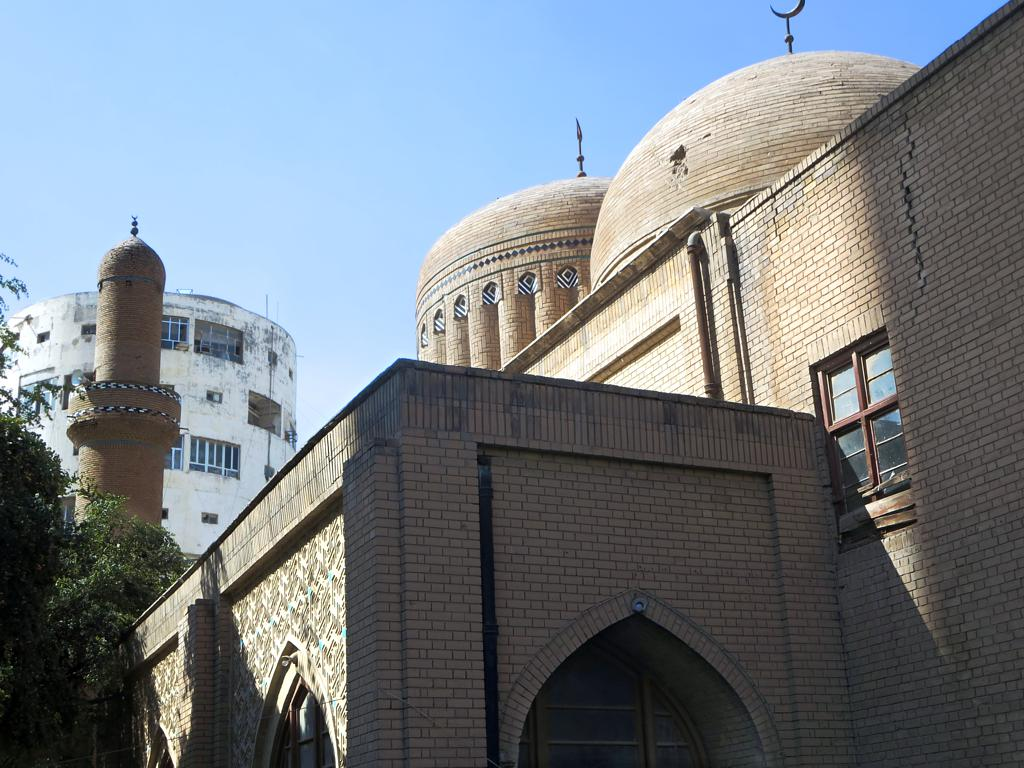
  The modern building of the Mirjan Mosque.
- The Sayyid Sultan Ali Mosque overlooking the Tigris River can be found through an entrance in the center of al-Rashid Street. The exact date of the mosque's construction is unknown and disputed although it was rebuilt and renovated several times throughout its existence such as an 1892 reconstruction ordered by Ottoman Sultan Abdul Hamid II. The mosque also contains the shrine for a man named Sultan Ali and a madrasa for the Rifa'i order.

=== Notable markets ===
==== Souk al-Haraj ====
Located in al-Maidan Square, Souk al-Haraj is known for having a large and diverse selection of items being sold in it. It is also known for being a largely crowded souk every day with thousands gathering in it every day.

==== Souk al-Safafeer ====
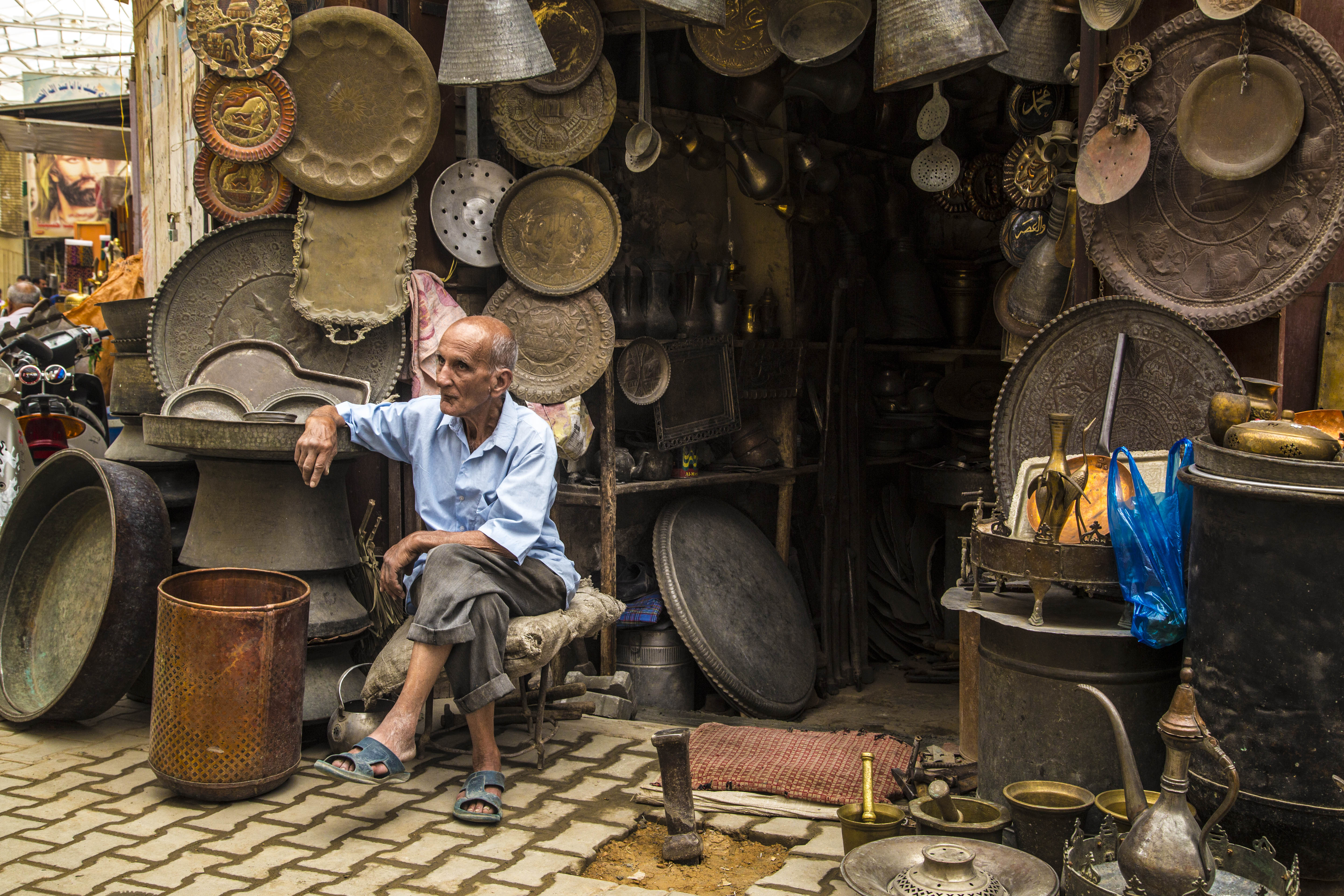
One of the coppersmith shops in Souk al-Safafeer.

Located between the Tigris River, al-Mustansiriya Madrasa, and al-Rashid Street, the 500-meter-wide Souk al-Safafeer is an old handicraft coppersmiths’ marketplace well known for its loud and echoing hammer beating noises against copper. The souk gets its name from the Arabic name for the color of copper "Safra" and has been active for centuries. The souk maintains traditional coppersmith handwork, a profession that many people picked up for centuries. The souk sells handmade copper decorations and items. Shortly before the 2003 US invasion, former French President Jacques Chirac visited the souk during a trip. Souk al-Safafeer historically was also home to many caravanserais and houses that belonged to notables, merchants, and Pashas of Baghdad.

=== Art and film institutions ===
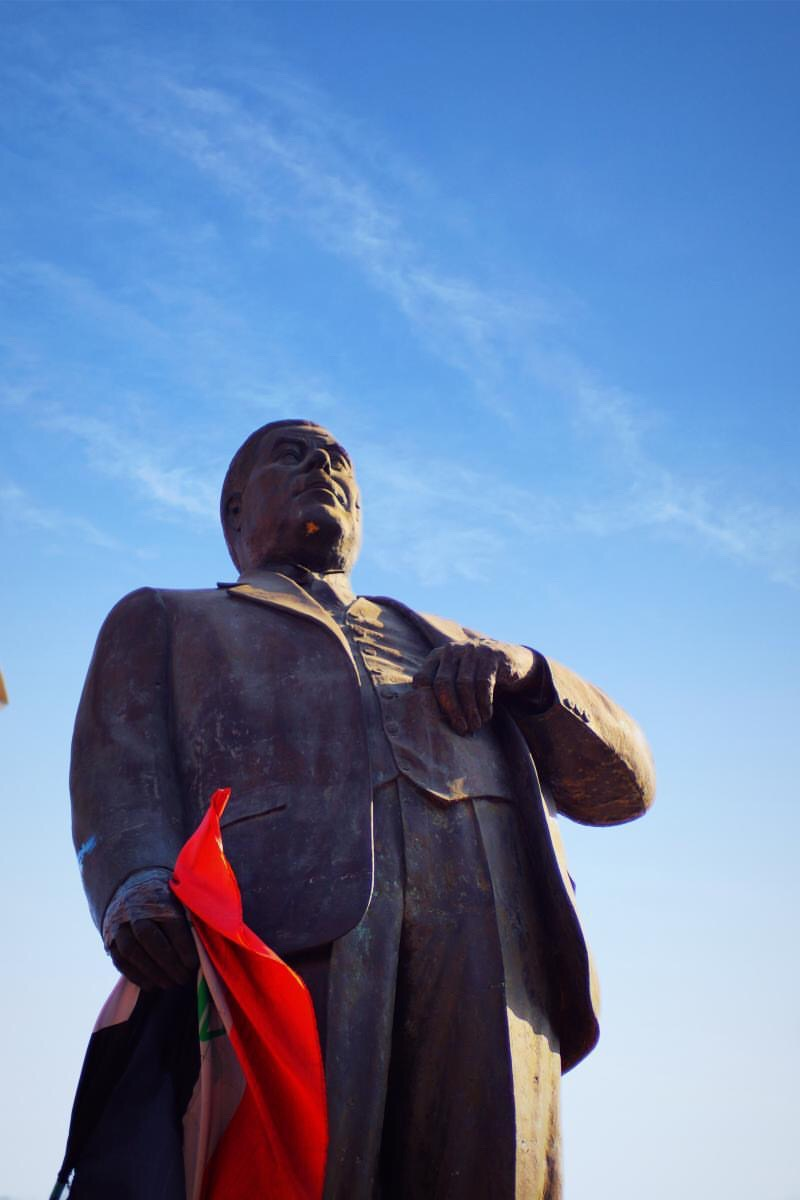
The statue of Poet al-Rusafi on the crossroads of al-Rashid Street.

The avenue contained one of the headquarters for the Chakmakchi Company, an Iraqi music company originally founded in 1918. The well-established institution played a role in preserving the old musical and artistic history of Iraq and the Middle East. Among the Iraqi singers that the company recorded were Muhammad al-Qubanchi, Nazem al-Ghazali, Hudiri Abu Aziz, Salima Pasha, and Afifa Iskandar while among the other singers include Umm Kulthum, Abdel Halim Hafez, Muhammad Abdel Wahab, Farid al-Atrash, and Fayza Ahmed. After the introduction of cassettes and CDs in the 1990s, the company declined in its activities.

The avenue was also home to many cinemas and theatres. Baghdad, along with Cairo and Beirut, was one of the only Middle Eastern cities that imported American movies that were shown in theatres and cinemas. The movies that were imported and shown included movies from Warner Brothers, 20s Century Fox Studios, Metro-Goldwyn-Mayer, Universal and Columbia Pictures as well as other Arab movies. The street included cinemas such as the Roxy Winter Cinema, the Roxy Summer Cinema, al-Zawra'a Cinema, the Rex Cinema, the Broadway Cinema (which later changed its name to Aladdin Cinema), al-Watan Cinema (later converted into a theater for the plays of Jassem Sharaf), al-Rashid Cinema, al-Rafidain Summer Cinema, the Royal Cinema, the Central Cinema, al-Hamra Cinema, the Cairo Summer Cinema and al-Sharq Cinema which was later demolished.

In the 1940s, after the death of Iraqi poet al-Rusafi, a statue for the poet was built in his honor at the crossroads of al-Rashid Street and al-Ma'mun Street and faces the direction in front of the al-Karkh district.

=== Other notable landmarks ===
After World War I, a Scottish immigrant in Iraq named Kenneth Mackenzie established the Mackenzie Library in the center of al-Rashid Street, a private library. After its owner suffered a heart attack in 1928 his brother, Donald Mackenzie, gave the management of the library to his brother's assistant, Jawad Karim, who would change management over time after each owner passed away. The library exported English literature, newspapers, magazines such as the Burda Style, and books such as Das Kapital.

The Khan Mirjan is located on the street, opposite the Mirjan Mosque and next to the Central Bank. Recognized as one of the finest caravanserais in the Middle East, the caravanserai became a notable historical landmark and a restaurant in the 1970s. In 2015, the Abd al-Karim Qasim Museum was opened after the former house of Halil Kut was restored to preserve the history of the era. The museum includes a lot of his belongings and gifts he received.

Baghdad Jewish Community Center is located on al-Rashid Street. It is the main community center and headquarters of the Administrative Committee for Iraqi Jews. It also serves as a cultural center for the small remnant Jewish community of Iraq, which is now around 160.

== Modern era and preservation status ==
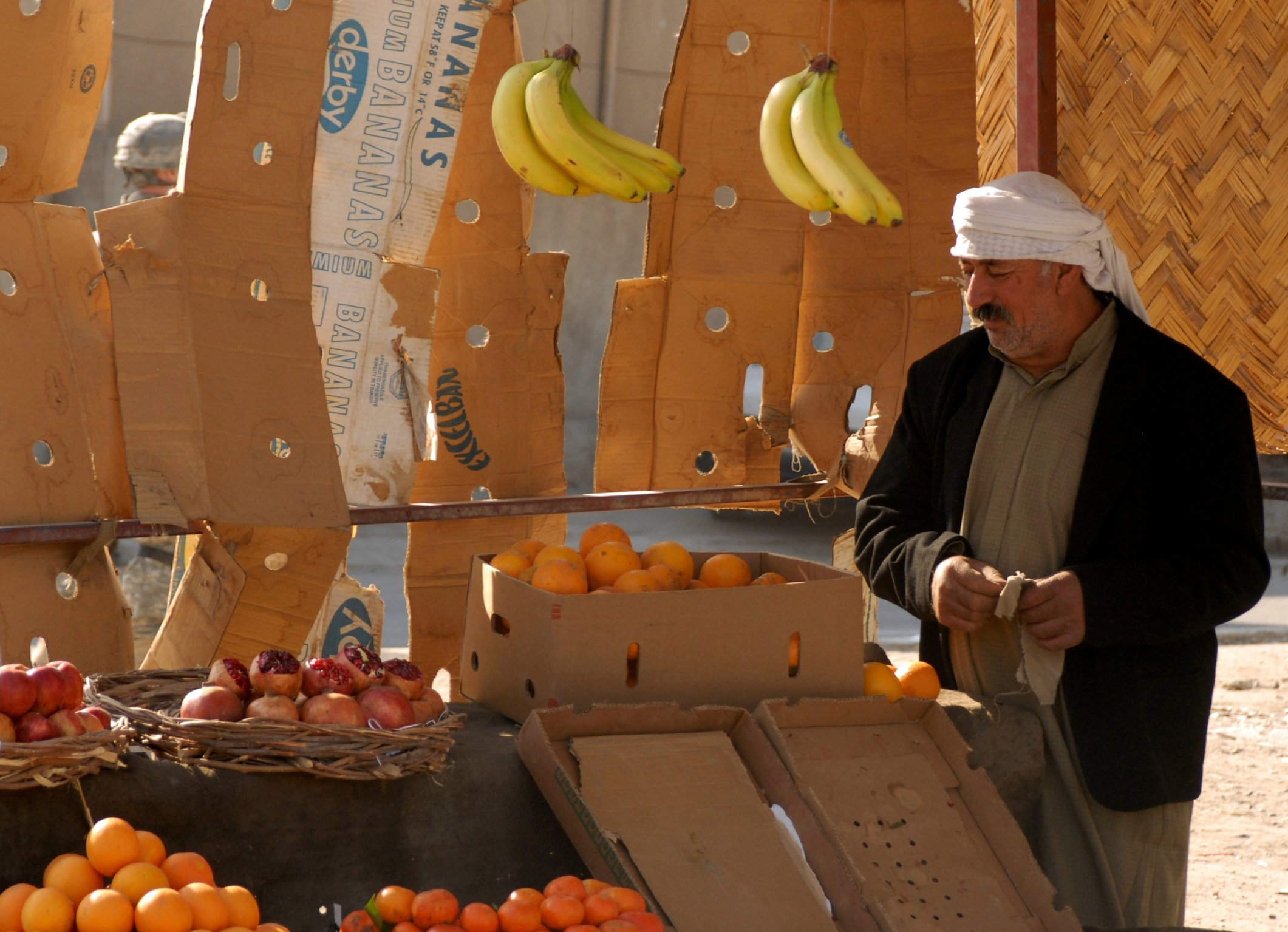
An Iraqi fruit seller on al-Rashid Street in 2009.

The first attempt to restore the street and return to its historical position was in 2001 under the leadership of Saddam Hussein who had ordered the restoration of the Sayyid Sultan Ali Mosque located on the outskirts of the street the year before. The municipality of Baghdad announced a campaign to develop and organize al-Rashid Street. Mayor of Baghdad, Adnan Abd al-Hameed al-Douri, made it clear that the campaign was aimed to make the street a social, commercial, and political movement as it was in the past, and it also falls within the framework of a broad plan to develop and organize Baghdad. This campaign was launched due to the hardships Baghdad had gone through due to the international sanctions against Iraq and the decline of the street due to the sanctions. Many establishments, such as the Brazilian Café, survived the decline. Hussein has also ordered the reconstruction of several mosques in the area such as the Haydar-Khana Mosque, Murjan Mosque, Mosque-Madrasa of al-Asifyah, al-Wazeer Mosque, and the Uzbek Mosque, as well as Churches and synagogues.

=== After the 2003 invasion of Iraq ===
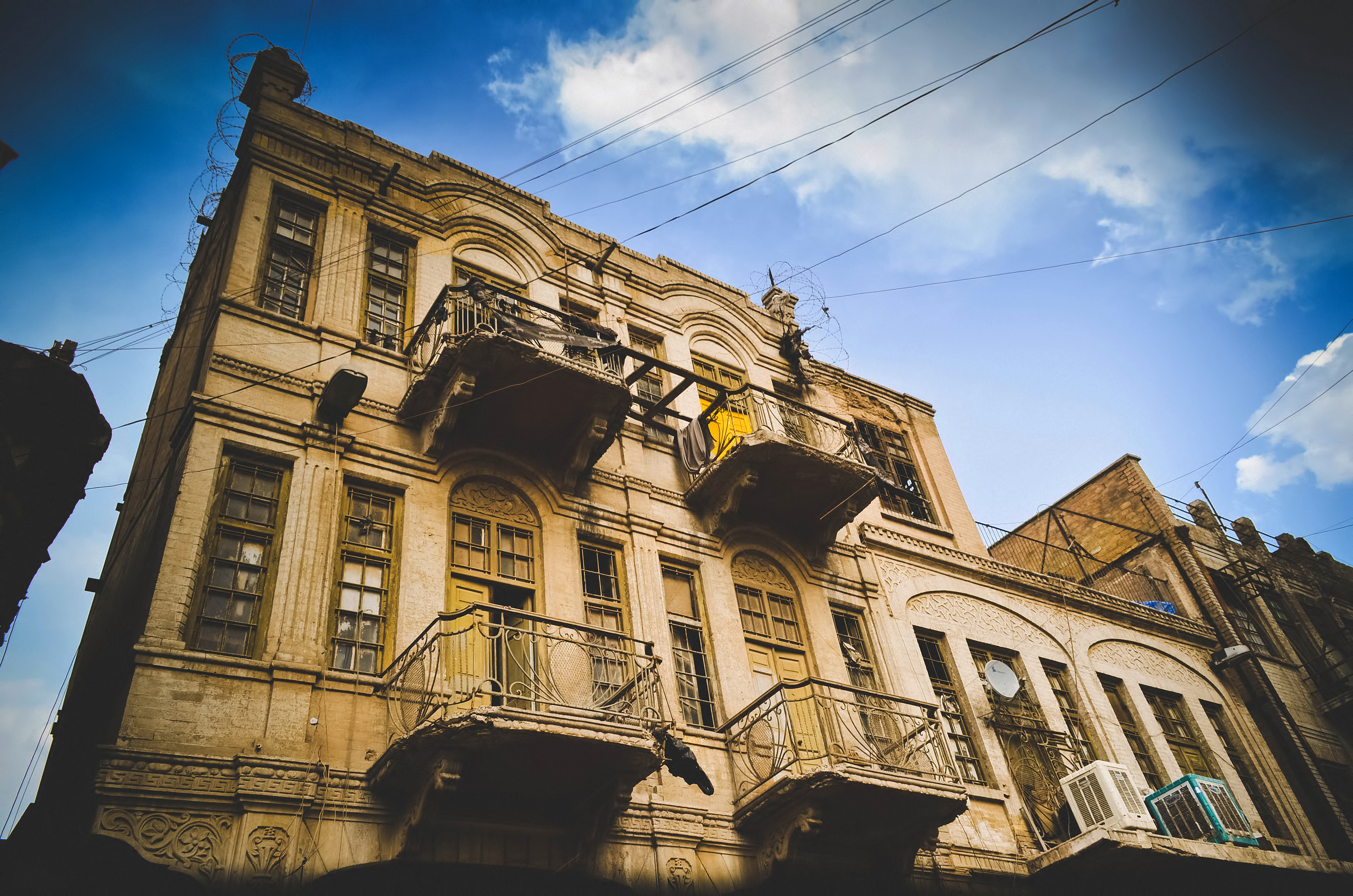
Old buildings on the avenue

Al-Rashid Street began to see a decline as a general social and intellectual location during the UN embargo on the country, especially the later 2003 invasion of Iraq. Many of its shop owners have since fled the country although many Iraqis have accused the new government of neglecting and ignoring the street's heritage. Reportedly, the street saw many buildings damaged by bullets due to the infighting between its people and clashes that had happened. Additionally, due to the invasion and sectarian violence that followed, the street became a victim of several bombing incidents that were planted near it. Al-Qaeda had started to monitor the avenue around the early days of the Iraq War.

On 17 September 2004, a car bomb exploded near a police station on the street and al-Mutanabbi Street, leaving at least 52 dead. Officials arrested 63 suspects who were foreign militants that came from other Arab countries. In June 2010, al-Rashid Street's Central Bank building was raided by unidentified terrorists disguised in military uniforms using several bombs to get through and rob the bank's Iraqi dinars and gold supplies to fund their insurgent group. The attack left 14 people dead and caused the avenue's shopkeepers to barricade their shops and flee. The last bombing on the avenue took place in 2016 which killed more than two dozen people.

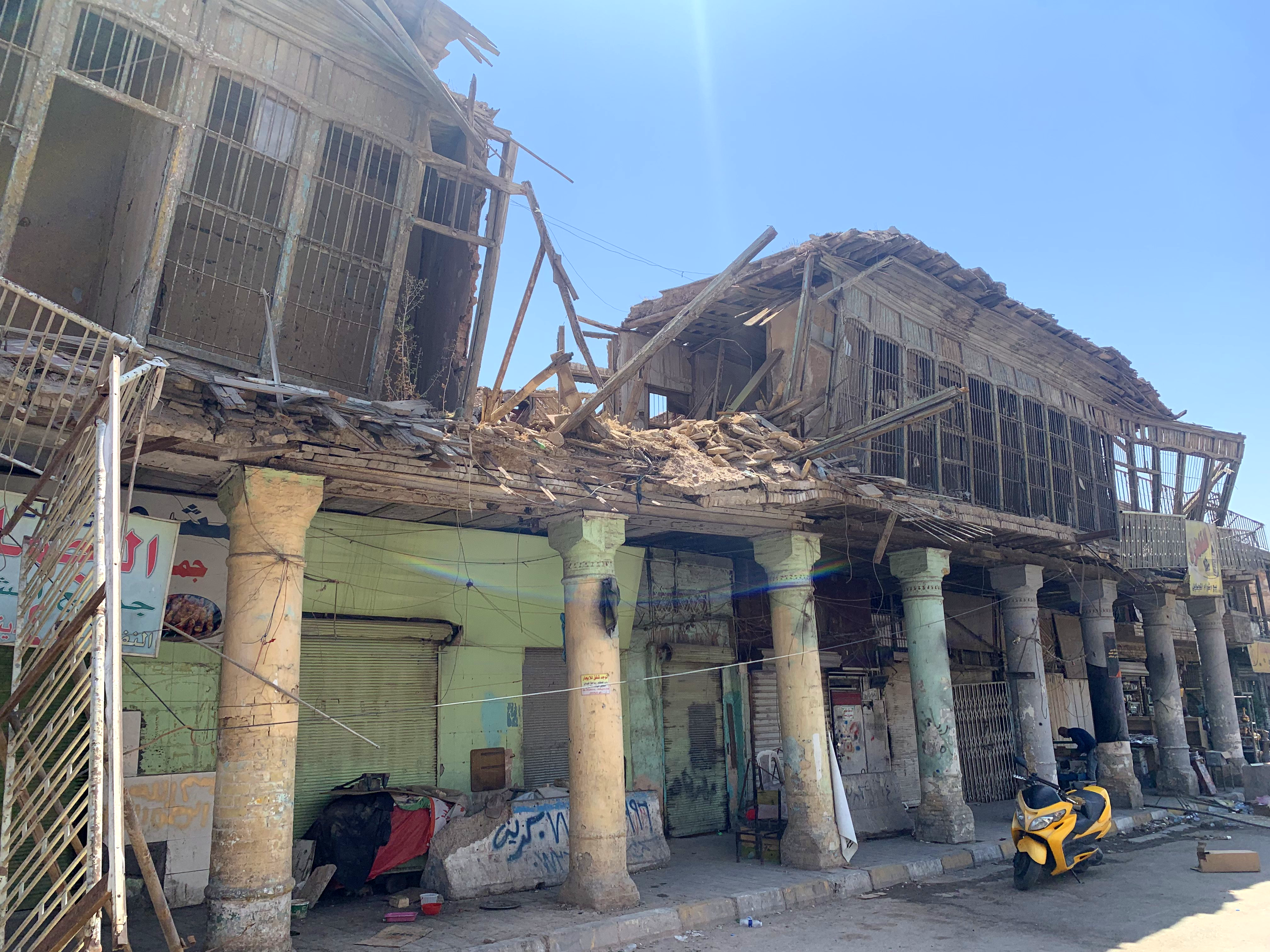
A building's shanashil collapsed on al-Rashid Street, 2023

Many of the famous shops on the streets that used to sell clothes were turned into shops selling tools, industrial supplies, and tools needed by construction workers, in parallel with the spread of shops selling electricity generators due to the electricity situation in Iraq after 2003. Coffeehouses such as the Parliament Café and the Brazilian Café also became shops selling electrical appliances and hardware. The cinema halls for al-Zawra'a and the Royal Cinema have been turned into large wards.

Over the years, there have been a lot of attempts to restore and preserve the street and to turn it back into an important street and a tourist site although several issues hindered it. According to the Municipality of Baghdad, 80% of the street buildings are owned by citizens and not by the state, so an agreement must be reached with them. As of 2018, 30% of the street's buildings have been restored. However, the Municipality was criticized for the restoration attempts due to having no architects, conservationists, or architecture historians working on the avenue. The street has also witnessed protests that demand the preservation of Iraqi heritage, reportedly sixteen protesters have died since. Fears of the destruction of the avenue's heritage were especially high after the demolishing of the Syriac Catholic Church in the Shorja areas in favor of a commercial store in 2019. According to writer Mehdi Falih, one of the reasons why the avenue is neglected is due to being named after Abbasid Caliph Harun al-Rashid which contradicts the Sectarianist Shi'i Muslim-dominated government due to allegations of Abbasid Caliphs assassinating the Twelver Imams.

Throughout the 21st century, many residents and activists have raised many campaigns to call attention to preserving the street. The Baghdad Municipality has announced a preservation plan several times since 2007. After the collapse of the Hilal Theater without an effort to rebuild it, concerns over the residents of the avenue were raised as other neglected arcades could fall on people and their shops. As of 2024, the avenue remains neglected and littered, many of its landmarks have already disappeared. Although in 2025, the part of al-Rashid Street that stretches from al-Maidan to Ma'ruf al-Rusafi Square was renewed with future plans to extend to the entire street. A tramway is planned to be established in the middle of the street.

== See also ==
- Abu Nuwas Street
- Café culture of Baghdad
- Al-Fitah Street
- Al-Jumhuriya Street
- Al-Mutanabbi Street
- Al-Mu'izz Street
