= Shorja =

Marketplace and neighborhood in Baghdad, Iraq

Shorja الشورجة
- Neighborhood
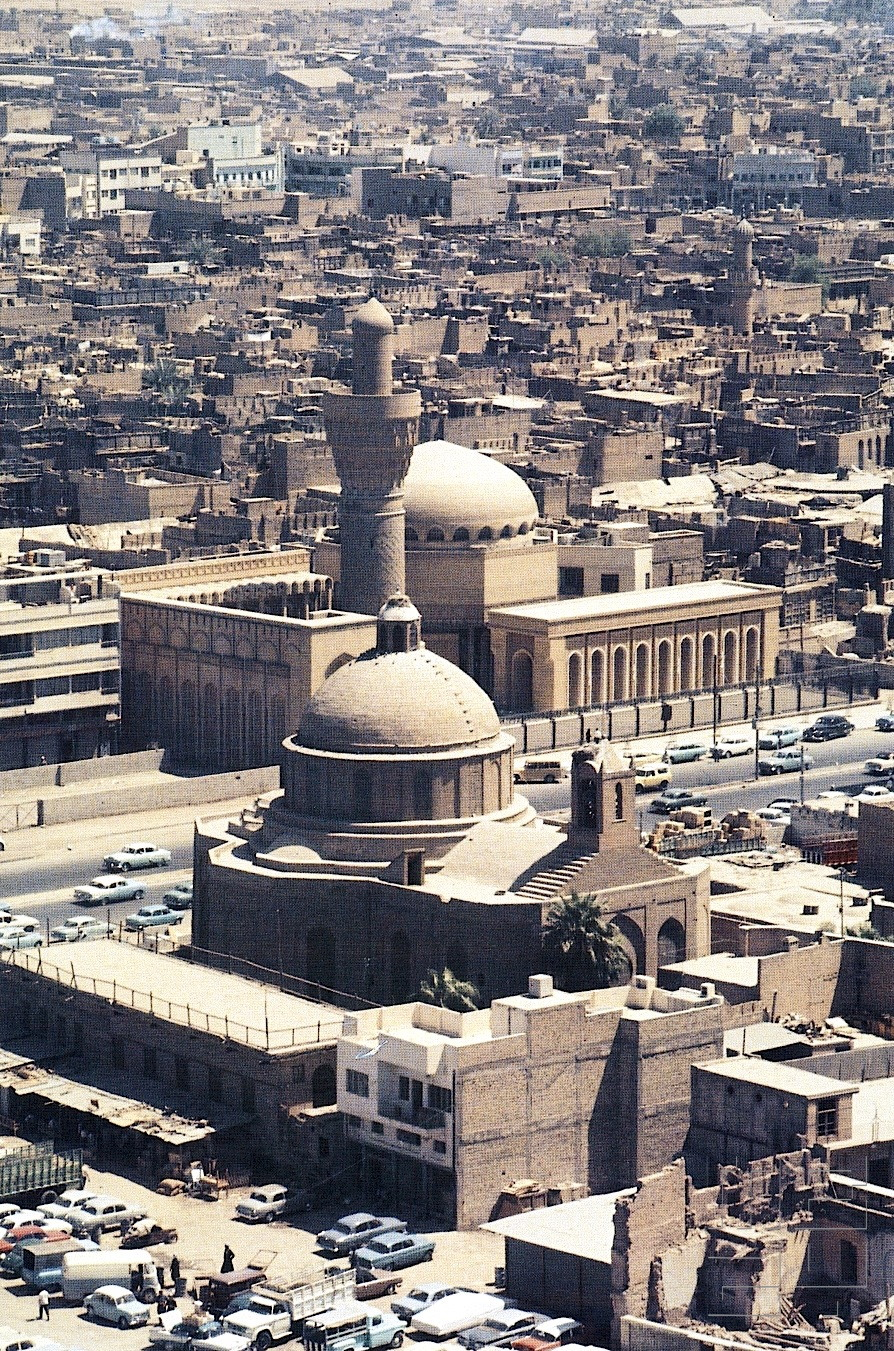
- The Shorja in the backdrop of the Catholic Latin Cathedral of St. Joseph and the Islamic al-Khulafa Mosque.
- Etymology: From Persian Shurchah (شورچاه), meaning "salty well"
- Interactive map of Shorja
- Coordinates: 33.33937°N 44.39445°E
- Country: Iraq
- City: Baghdad

Al-Shorja (Arabic, الشورجة), or simply just Shorja, is one of Baghdad’s historic and renowned marketplaces, with origins dating back to the late Abbasid Caliphate. Its traditional site stretches from al-Kifah Street, across al-Jumhuriyya Street, and usually extends as far as the Mirjan Mosque on al-Rashid Street. Because the area includes merchants with differing backgrounds, the area previously had its own lexicon. Due to this diversity, Shorja has been described as an area that encompasses all of Baghdad, as well as due to its history and diversity.

== Etymology ==
One of the original names of al-Shorja was "al-Tamara" due to the popular sale of dates in its markets. The current name Shorja likely came from a corrupted version of the Persian word Shurchah (Persian: شورچاه), meaning "salty well."

== Historical background ==
=== Abbasid period (892 – 1258) ===
What is generally referred to as al-Shorja today wasn't mentioned in old records or any Iraqi books as a unanimous location. Instead, the general area was home to several landmarks and marketplaces in the Abbasid Caliphate. Among these landmarks was the Dar al-Khalifat, built during the reigns of Caliphs al-Mu'tadid (r. 892–902) and al-Muktafi (r. 902–908). This was a sprawling royal complex comprising several major and minor residences and gardens. This remained the main caliphal residence for the remainder of the Abbasid Caliphate.

Around 902 CE, Ali al-Muktafi succeeded his father as caliph and began renovating the Dar al-Khalifat. He ordered the construction of a large Friday mosque that became known as Jami' al-Qasr (Arabic: جامع القصر, lit. 'Mosque of the Palace'), today known as the Khulafa Mosque. Although the mosque was built for the use of the caliphs, it was shortly then opened for general use. The people living in the area visited it for prayers and to discuss daily affairs. During the 1258 Mongol invasion, the area was destroyed alongside the mosque, but Hulegu Khan ordered the mosque to be rebuilt.

=== During the 2003 U.S. occupation ===
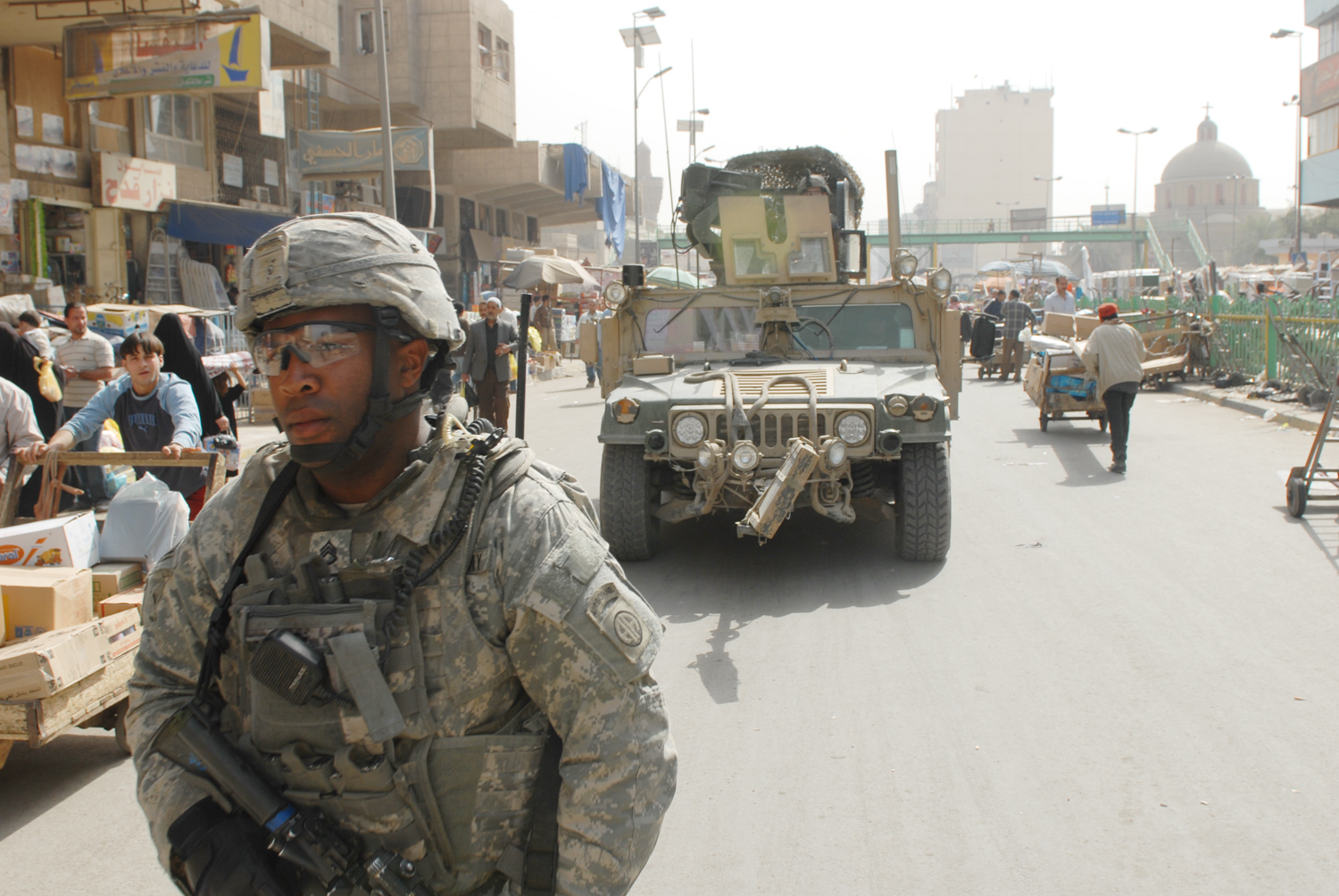
A member of the 82nd Airborne Division patrolling around the marketplace, 26 February 2009.

Shorja was the site of several major attacks. The 12 February 2007 Baghdad bombings killed 76 people and injured 155–180. Near the marketplace on March 26, 2007, a suicide car bomber killed two people and injured five others. Snipers hidden in Shorja's bazaar killed several people around the same time, and gunfights erupted between militants and the Iraqi security forces in the area.

On 1 April 2007, American presidential candidate John McCain visited the Shorja marketplace to show that the security situation had improved. The visit was criticized by The New York Times as giving a false indication of how secure the area was due to the weighty security forces McCain brought with him. Indiana Representative Mike Pence was also criticized for visiting the market, under heavy security including helicopters overhead, and saying it was "like a normal outdoor market in Indiana in the summertime."

== Notable landmarks ==
=== Religious landmarks ===
==== Al-Khulafa Mosque ====
Al-Khulafa Mosque (Arabic: جامع الخلفاء, lit. 'The Caliphs' Mosque') is the oldest surviving Abbasid mosque in Baghdad. It is the only surviving feature of the Dar al-Khalifat. Also called the Jami' al-Qasr ("Mosque of the Palace"), it was originally reserved for the Caliphs but was shortly after opened to the public. The mosque was destroyed during the 1258 Mongol invasion but was soon rebuilt under Hulegu Khan's orders. However, the reconstruction lacked the prestige of the previous Abbasid mosque, considered one of the three main mosques of Abbasid Baghdad. During the Ottoman period, the mosque fell into ruin with only its minaret standing. It was fully restored in the 1960s in a project headed by Iraqi architect Muhammad Makiyya and opened to the public.

==== Latin Cathedral of St. Joseph ====
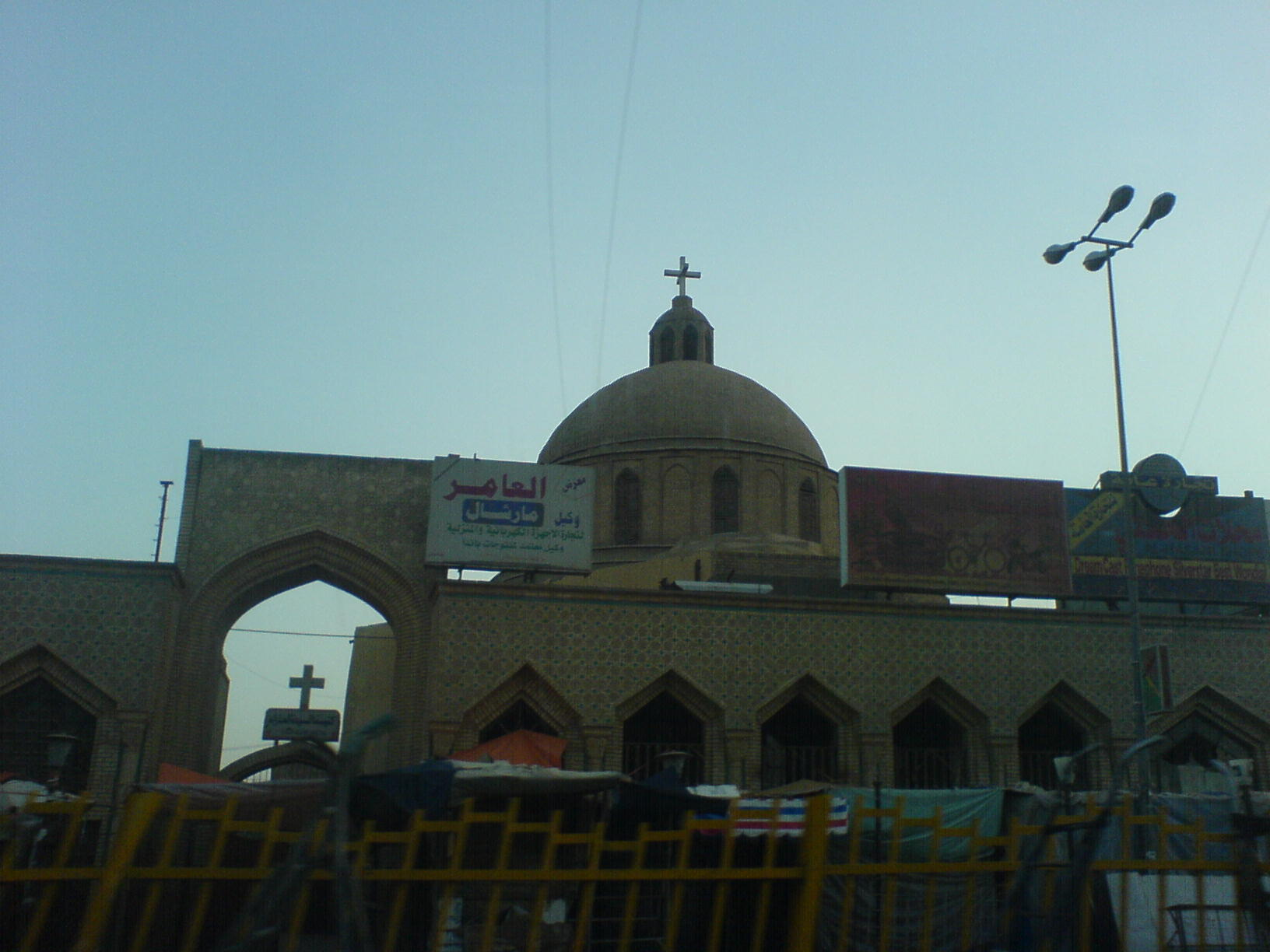
The cathedral as seen from al-Jumhuriyya Street.

The Latin Cathedral of St. Joseph (Arabic: كاتدرائية القديس يوسف اللاتينية) is a Roman Catholic church build during the late 19th century on the grounds of a Christian monastery that dated back to the 1737. The Latin presence in Iraq originated under a 1237 delegation led by William of Monferrat and sent by Pope Gregory IX to the Abbasid court. However, a Latin diocese in Baghdad wasn't established until 6 September 1632 during Safavid Persian rule in Iraq. The cathedral was built and administrated by the Ottoman Empire. The cathedral stands in a Christian quarter named Aqued al-Nassara in the Shorja, but the area, as well as the cathedral, has recently suffered from the flight of Christians due to the Iraq War.

===== Tomb of Anastase-Marie al-Karmali =====
The churchyard of the cathedral also contains a cemetery where many of the Carmelite monks and nuns served. Among those is the tomb of Anastase-Marie al-Karmali (1866–1947), an Iraqi Catholic priest and Discalced Carmelite friar, as well as a lexicologist, lexicographer, and philologist of the Arabic language.

==== Al-Nawbakhti Shrine ====
Al-Nawbakhti Shrine (Arabic: مقام النوبختي) is a Twelver Shi'i Muslim mausoleum and mosque. The complex is the resting place of the third Twelver Deputy Ibn Ruh al-Nawbakhti, who died in 937 CE, and has since become a place for ziyarat. A large dome tops the building.

=== Historic markets ===
==== Souk al-Ghazl ====
Souk al-Ghazl (Arabic: سوق الغزل, lit. 'The Threads' Market') is a bazaar located next to al-Khulafa Mosque. During the Abbasid period, the current location of the souk was part of the Dar al-Khalifat, later being known as the Caliphs' Quarter. It only became a souk during the Ottoman period when it became a popular marketplace for Baghdadi Jews and bird sellers. There are no established boundaries between the Shorja markets and Souk al-Ghazl, leading many to consider it part of the Shorja. The souk is also located beneath the Jewish Torah neighborhood.

==== Souk Hanun ====
Souk Hanun (Arabic: سوق الغزل, lit. 'The Threads' Market') was a Jewish neighborhood and market located around the area of Shorja and the Torah neighborhoods. The identity of Haun is unknown but Iraqi historian Imad Abd al-Salam Rauf theorized that the name belonged to a Jewish merchant who established an important shop in the area. The neighborhood was located around a passageway that encompasses the 'Albu Shibl quarter, a quarter inhabited by members of the Tayy, an ancient Arabian tribe.

== See also ==
- Baghdad Jewish Community Center
- Bataween
- History of the Jews in Baghdad

== Bibliography ==
- Duri, A. A. (1960). "Baghdād". In Gibb, H. A. R.; Kramers, J. H.; Lévi-Provençal, E.; Schacht, J.; Lewis, B. & Pellat, Ch. (eds.). The Encyclopaedia of Islam, Second Edition. Volume I: A–B. Leiden: E. J. Brill. pp. 894–908. doi:10.1163/1573-3912_islam_COM_0084. OCLC 495469456.
- Le Strange, Guy (1922). Baghdad During the Abbasid Caliphate. From Contemporary Arabic and Persian Sources (Second ed.). Oxford: Clarendon Press.
- Rauf, Imad Abd al-Salam (2004). The historical origins of Baghdad's quarters (in Arabic) (1st ed.). Dar al-Muthana for Printing and Publishing.

=== External links ===
- Al-Shorja Market
