= Al-Zawra'a Cinema =

Historic cinema in Baghdad, Iraq

- Arabic: سينما الزوراء
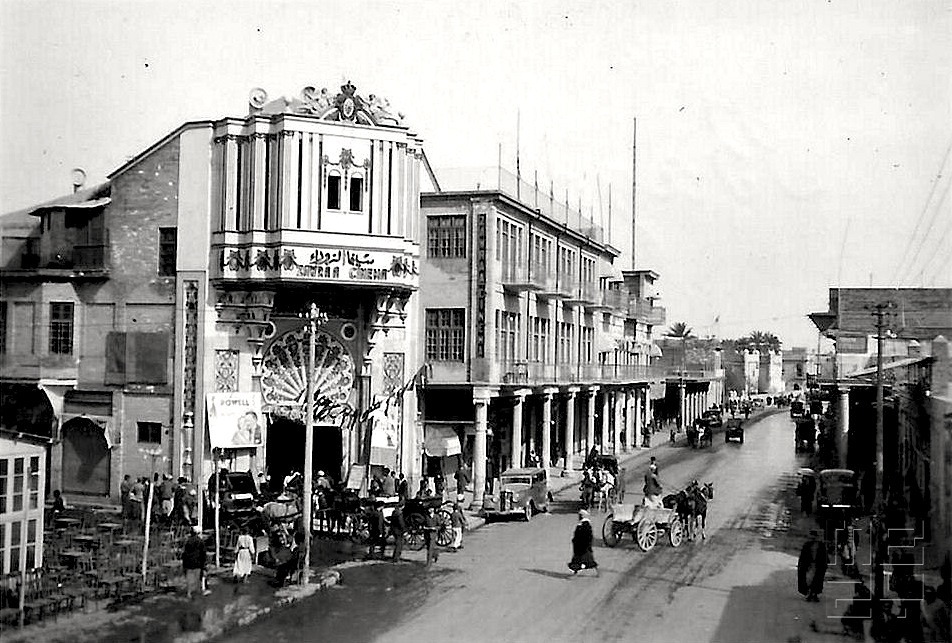
- Address: Al-Rashid Street; Baghdad; Iraq

Construction
- Opened: 1930s

Al-Zawra'a Cinema (Arabic: سينما الزوراء, romanized: Sinama al-Zawra') is one of the oldest cinemas located on al-Muraba'a area in Baghdad, Iraq. The cinema is considered an important architectural landmark of al-Rashid Street and a Baghdadi heritage sight.

== History ==
By the early 20th century, cinemas started to materialize in Baghdad and became a part of Iraqi life. At the time, going to cinemas was a weekly event for both the working class and the middle class. Thursday became the traditional day of the week in which Baghdadi families and students went to theatres. One of them, al-Zawra'a Cinema, was built in 1937 inspired by German architecture and opened in the early 1930s and was famous for showcasing Flash Gordon serials in theatres. A café next to the cinema's entrance named "Mulla Hamadi Café" provided coffee and entertainment for the visitors to the cinema as well as students. The cinema was considered remarkable and was also located near the Brazilian Café.

After the United Nations imposed sanctions on Iraq following the Gulf War, the cinema industry in Iraq started to suffer and decline. Movies stopped being imported and even movies inside the country stopped being produced. Al-Zawra'a Cinema became empty and its equipment was outdated. The cinema has since been deserted. Al-Zawra'a Cinema remains one of the only surviving examples of old Baghdadi cinemas along with the Roxy Cinema. Unlike other cultural buildings on al-Rashid Street that were turned into commercial shops, the cinema was turned into a theater.

== Architecture ==
The architecture of the building was designed in order to look like the embodiment of cinematic fiction and the imaginary worlds of the movies that were shown in the cinema. The presence of the decorations of the strange-shaped façade on the exterior of the cinema is intended to hint at an imagined cinematic reality. It is unknown who was the designer of the cinema, although some sources indicate it was an architect named "Nu'man Munib al-Mutwali" who designed and supervised many buildings around Baghdad.

== See also ==
- Cinema of Iraq
- Cinema of the Middle East
- Culture of Iraq
