= Brazilian Café =

Brazilian Café مقهى البرازيلية

Restaurant information
- Established: 1937
- Closed: After 2003
- Location: Baghdad, Iraq

The Brazilian Café (Arabic: مقهى البرازيلية) was an old well-known coffeehouse in Baghdad, Iraq, that was notable for its European style and significant artistic legacy. Located near the Aladdin Cinema, the coffeehouse also provided Brazilian coffee that was imported from Brazil since the 1940s which was prepared by a specialized worker using machines for preparing steamed coffee. Among its well-known visitors were former Iraqi Prime Minister Nuri al-Said and the Iraqi poet Abd al-Wahhab al-Bayati.

== Description ==
The Brazilian Café was officially opened in 1937 in al-Rashid Street. Due to its European style, the coffeehouse stood out from the many coffeehouses in Baghdad. Many of the cafés of Baghdad were traditionally Baghdadi in style. The café, along with the Swiss Café on the same street, was visited by artists and writers who studied in art institutes in Rome, Paris, and many other European cities. The Brazilian Café was much more traditional than the Swiss Café. The café served Turkish coffee, which included Brazilian beans, after which the coffeehouse extracts its name from.

It also Nescafe that it imported from outside countries since the 1940s and would provide the latest news of politics, literature, and culture at the time, along with newspapers and magazines that were also provided by the café. The coffeehouse also had an outside area to sit in on the sidewalks of al-Rashid Street and was also located next to a club-house where Afifa Iskandar was known to sing.

The coffeehouse was also a resting place for college students, the educated class, writers, and poets. Notably, a young Jawad Seleem wrote in his memoirs after meeting Polish artists in the coffeehouse "Now I know color, now I know drawing." Young poets would also gather in the coffeehouse to fulfill an independent role, and to make a stand independently.

== Notable events ==
The coffeehouse was significant for being the first starting point for the emergence of the modern plastic movement in Iraq, and the first starting point for establishing the Union of Iraqi Writers. Visitors of the café, including its founders Abd al-Wahhab al-Bayati, Kazem Jawad, Rushdi al-Amil, and Nizar Abbas, applied for a license to form the union and help in its establishment. The Iraqi government at the time, which reportedly spied on several Iraqi poets and writers, showed concern following its establishment. Following the arrest of artist Hussein Mardan by the police due to pictures of his controversial poetic collection "Nude Poems" resurfaced, many Iraqi writers have been dismissed from their jobs.

After the Iraq War, the Brazilian Café closed its doors similar to many Baghdadi coffeehouses, its building was turned into a commercial store for selling fabrics.

== See also ==
- Al-Beiruti Café
- Café culture of Baghdad
- Shabandar Café
- Al-Zahawi Café
