= Al-Jumhuriya Street =

Avenue in Baghdad, Iraq

- Al-Khulafa Street (Arabic: شارع الخلفاء)
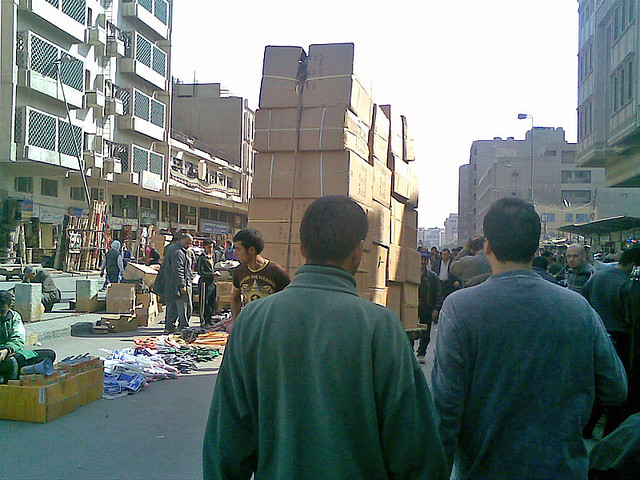
- Interactive map of Al-Jumhuriya Street
- Native name: Arabic: شارع الجمهورية
- Width: 2,600 meters
- Location: Baghdad, Iraq
- Coordinates: 33°18′51″N 44°25′15″E

Other
- Known for: Al-Khulafa Mosque; Souk al-Ghazil; Latin Cathedral of St. Joseph
- Status: Active

Al-Jumhuriya Street (Arabic: شارع الجمهورية, lit. 'The Republic Street'), also known as al-Khulafa Street (Arabic: شارع الخلفاء, lit. 'The Caliphs Street'), is an old avenue located in the center of Baghdad, Iraq. The street contains many notable landmarks and heritage sites such as al-Khulafa Mosque, which the street gains its secondary name from, and the markets of Shorja and Ghazil Market. As well as many old traditional houses.

The site of the street contains al-Khulafa Mosque, along with the markets, which predate the street by centuries. Construction on the street began in 1957 and ended in 1959, and was built as an avenue parallel to both al-Rashid Street and al-Kifah Street, located in between the two, and connected with various roundabouts.

== Historical background ==
=== Pre-construction ===
The oldest surviving part of the road is al-Khulafa Mosque. Built in 902 by Abbasid Caliph al-Muktafi, the mosque was a large Friday Mosque and the second of the three great mosques of east Baghdad. The mosque, originally a personal mosque for the Abbasid Caliphs, was an active mosque opened to the public and would be attended by locals actively for the last centuries of the Abbasid Caliphate's existence. After the mosque's destruction during the 1258 Mongol Siege of Baghdad, only the minaret survived which became known as the "Souk al-Ghazil minaret" and would lay in ruins for centuries after. The mosque's location being in Souk al-Ghazil was noted by Guy Le Strange when reading through old Abbasid sources. Ottoman governor Suleiman Pasha would build a mosque connecting the minaret to a mosque in the 19th century until the mosque was demolished in favor of constructing the street.

Around the area of al-Khulafa Mosque, the area was consisted of a wide network of markets, among them was the Shorja markets. The Shorja consists of a covered bazaar that runs through an old Iraqi Jewish quarter of Baghdad. The market consisted of many khan-like Jewish shops that sold grain in quantity that were brought in bags using camels. The bazaar also sold eye of envy charms and clothes.

=== Establishment of the avenue ===
During the Royal Era, the streets of Baghdad were crowded which made the Iraqi government implement a number of projects related to organizing, paving, and opening the streets. One of these was al-Jumhuriya street which began its construction in the 1950s to ease the traffic crisis in the streets of the city. Work on expanding it only began in 1957 in which old houses and buildings were demolished to pave the way for it. Originally, the street was called "Queen Aliya Street" before it was changed in the Republican era. There was also plans to expand the street but they were never implemented. The Ghazil Market is located in the street and has been active since the 1950s. The market sells animal pets. In modern times, the street became a ground for demonstrations which lead to clashes and the closing of the street a few times. The avenue is also known for its heavy traffic.

A local folk tale among people living in the street talks about when students of the madrasa of Haydar-Khana Mosque complained about losing their underwear nylon stockings. The complaints spawned the idea that an underwear thief is active in the area. When demolishing crowded buildings for the expansion of the street, they found many stork nests with nylon stockings, bras, and other thin underwear scattered among them.

== Sights of interest ==
=== Souk al-Ghazil ===
The Souk al-Ghazil (Arabic: سوق الغزل) is an old historic bazaar which sells animal pets and is only active on Fridays. The souk was visited by James Silk Buckingham during his visit to Baghdad in 1816. He noted that the market, which sold cotton thread, was very crowded and also visited the remains of al-Khulafa Mosque that the souk surrounded which at the time was destroyed with only its minaret remained.

=== Al-Khulafa Mosque ===
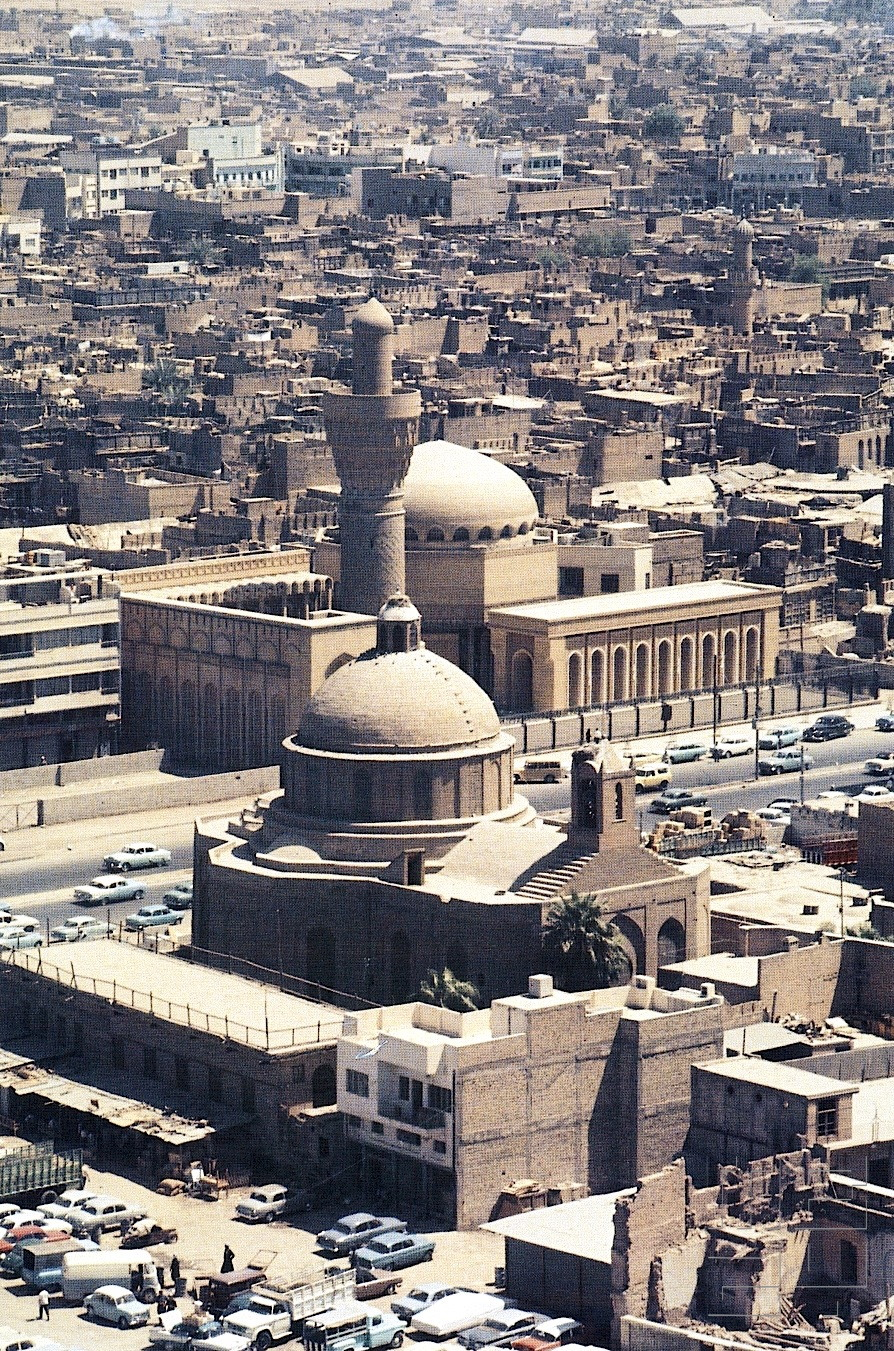
Al-Khulafa Mosque next in front of the Latin Cathedral in 1964.

Al-Khulafa Mosque (Arabic: جامع الخلفاء) is one of the oldest and biggest historic mosques in Baghdad. The mosque dates back to the Abbasid Caliphate and was built during the reign of Abbasid Caliph al-Muktafi and held one of the largest Friday prayers in the last a few centuries of the Caliphate. Its minaret has been standing for over 1,200 years although, in recent years, it has inclined and is under the threat of collapsing due to neglect from the current Iraqi government. For centuries, the mosque's minaret was the highest level in Baghdad.

=== Latin Cathedral of St. Joseph ===
The Latin Cathedral of St. Joseph (Arabic: كاتدرائية القديس يوسف الكلدانية) is an old Catholic cathedral that was built in 1871 during the Ottoman period in the Shorja area. The Church is built in Iraqi architecture and includes a large 32 meter dome with a cross on top of it topped with a circular cylinder and windows at the level of the church wing. From 1942 to 1943, Polish troops stationed in Baghdad during World War II celebrated Divine Liturgy in this building along with the bishops. Currently, the cathedral suffers from neglect due to government oversight and is in need of restoration. It has also been suffering from inconvenience due to the chaotic market it is surrounded by and the exodus of Christians from the areas that surround the Church to more modern neighborhoods in the city.

== See also ==
- Al-Rasheed Street
- Christianity in Iraq
- Shorja
