= Al-Samaw'al Street =

Old street in Baghdad, Iraq

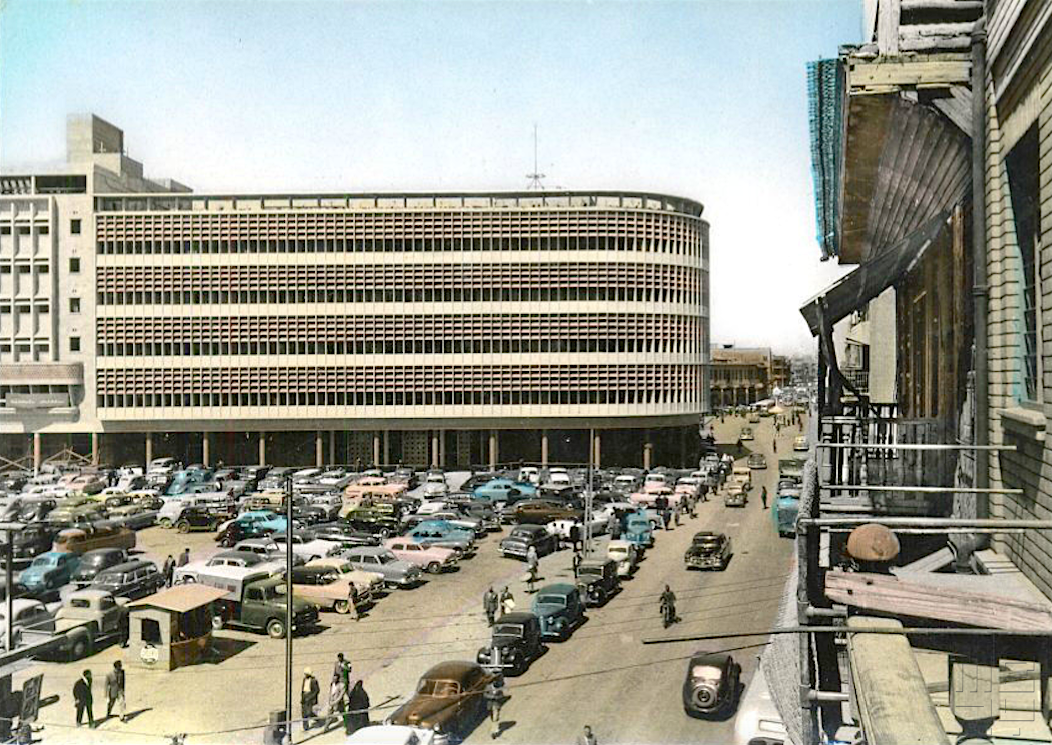
- The beginning of the street from al-Rashid Street
- Native name: Arabic: شارع السموأل
- Part of: Old Baghdad
- Location: Baghdad, Iraq

Other
- Known for: Being the old commercial and financial center of Baghdad

Al-Samaw'al Street (Arabic: شارع السموأل) is a street in al-Rusafa that was formerly the main commerce and financial center of Baghdad, Iraq.

== Historical background ==
The street was named after Samaw'al ibn 'Adiya, the pre-Islamic Arab Jewish poet. The street began at the intersect of the Mirjan Mosque and ended at the Tigris River where it intersects with al-Nahr Street. During the 1950s, al-Rashid Street saw a flourishing in commercial and financial centers which also spread to al-Samu'al Street, which connected to al-Rashid Street. The street became known for its financial pulse and role in the Baghdadi stock exchange at the time.

This street area contained the main al-Rafidain Bank headquarters and other private commercial banks. Before 1948, many of the workers in these financial institutions were Iraqi Jews, Indians, and British people. Iraqi businessmen met with sellers in coffeehouses on al-Samu'al Street to complete sales and discuss purchasing bargains. Many of the financial families of Baghdad, such as the Chalabi, Fattah Pasha, Yamin Lawi, Khazzam, al-Damarchi, and other families. Because of the commercial activities, it was also nicknamed the Bank's Street.

The historic Khan Mirjan is also located at the beginning of the street.

=== Present era ===
After 2003, the street was closed until 2025 when the Baghdad Operations Command announced that it will reopen for banking and traffic. In 2022, the Iraqi government approved 80 name changes for streets in Baghdad in an alleged attempt to erase their legacies. Al-Samaw'al Street was among the streets. However, most Iraqis ignored the renames.
