= Abd al-Malik Nuri =

Iraqi writer (1921–1998)

- عبد الملك نوري
- Born: 1921
- Died: 1998 (aged 76–77)
- Occupation: Novelist
- Writing career
- Genres: Critical realism, secularism, literary fiction

Abd al-Malik Nuri (Arabic: عبد الملك نوري, 1921-1998 CE) was an Iraqi novelist and writer active during the Iraqi cultural scene of the 20th century known for both his fiction and non-fiction writings, as well as participating in the revival of Iraqi literature in his time.

Nuri was best known for his short story "Fattuma" but also published several collections of novels during the 1950s, including: The Last Lantern, Omar Beg, The Handmaid, The Smile and Spring, The Wall of Silence (1953), The Little Man (1953), and The Song of the Earth (1954). This was followed in 1980 by The Autumn Counts. He was also the author of an essay on the "Tragedy of Art ", several short stories featured in his collection Rusul al-Insaniyya (1946), and the play Wood and Velvet (1980).

== Early life ==
Abd al-Malik Nuri was born in Suez in the Sultanate of Egypt in 1921 while his family was on a trip outside Iraq but would eventually return to Iraq where Nuri would attend school. Later he would move to Beirut for two years to attend the American University of Beirut where he would learn the English language. After he completed his studies, he returned to Iraq where he entered the College of Law, graduating in 1944.

== Writing career ==
=== Iraqi Literary work ===
While studying, he took an interest in writing and would take this interest seriously during his first year at university. Nuri was influenced by Dhu'l-Nun Ayyub's work, who was a widely read Iraqi writer then. Ayyub's critical realism methods would influence Nuri, and this influence was seen in his first collection of short stories,"Rusul al-Insaniyya" (Messengers of Insanity), published in 1946. Nuri would later recount in a 1953 Akhbar al-Sa'a journal that he, among other writers then, always hoped to become a famous writer like Ayyub. Although Nuri would become more critical of Ayyub's work over time when he began reading more foreign literature from the United States, United Kingdom, and Egypt.

Another figure that influenced Nuri was a fellow Iraqi writer Fu'ad al-Takarli. In the autumn of 1949, Nuri sent a telegram to al-Takarli announcing his intention to arrive to meet him at the civil courts, where al-Takarli worked. Nuri was a fan of al-Takarli's short stories and was looking for advice. The two would develop a friendship and held regular meetings in the Swiss Coffeehouse alongside other friends where they discussed matters. In 1948, Nuri published his most famous fictional short story "Fattuma" which depicted the struggles of a lonely woman. The short story was renowned for its episodic, lyricist, and nonlinear structure, as well as its compelling and daring portrayal of life under threat. Nuri would eventually win First Prize for the best Arabic short story for his story in a competition organized by the Beiruti literary magazine al-Adib.

Nuri's work began to become well-known outside of Iraq and was part of a revival movement of Iraqi literature that was also picked up by writers such as Nazik al-Mala'ika and Badr Shakir al-Sayyab. In 1952, Egyptian writer Yusuf al-Sharuni would even dedicate a story he had publish in al-Adib to Nuri. Subsequently, Palestinian writer Jabra Ibrahim Jabra recommended Nuri's work to English translator Denys Johnson-Davies stayed in Iraq so that he could translate it.

=== Later work ===
However, by 1955 Nuri would begin to lose motivation for writing after he was sent to a military training camp, along with other leftist Iraqi intellectuals. This was part of a communist takedown led by Nuri al-Sa'id's government in which suspected communists, teachers, college professors, and minor civil servants began to lose their jobs. After publishing his last story "Mu'anat" (Suffering), Nuri retired from public life although between 1968 and 1972 he published two theater plays and began to write eight drafts for theater. The two plays concerned a character named "Dudu" who suffered from being a descendant of the failed playwright and had appeared in a previous short story titled "Ma'sat al-Fann" (The Tragedy of Art), published in 1946.

== Literary style and themes ==
Due to the atmosphere of Arab Nationalism of the Arab Cold War and his influence from Ayyub and al-Takarli, Nuri was secular and was highly critical of the religious establishments of Iraq. Namely, he viewed sectarianism as a dangerous religiosity that could hinder the nation's progress. Nur's stories also depicted the city as a negative place where normal people are cheated and was open about showing how cities don't benefit his characters. This attitude was inspired by the immigration of rural Iraqis to the cities during the 1950s which posed great challenges for them, as well as their political climate. This attitude towards cities was also expressed by other Iraqi writers like al-Sayyab and Buland al-Haydari. Nuri would also use the concept of "blindness", both physically, and symbolically, to criticize the traditional Iraqi society and the unfair treatment of its people.

And example of this can be found in his story "Rih al-Janub" (ريح الجنوب, The South Wind) where Nuri depicts a holy man named "Sheikh Muḥ'yī al-Dīn" who is believed to have magical powers to cure the sick and travels from place to place to heal people. This statement is further explained by the line "A big, very big saint. His miracles are also known to all." The story follows a mother named Khuḍayrah who travels to find the holy man so that he could cure her blind daughter Khādjiyah. Khuḍayrah's faith is further reflected in perceiving the sounds of a train wheel as "Allahu Akbar" and her desire to visit the Imam Husayn shrine to gain barakah. The father also admires the holy man and asks Khuḍayrah to bring him the soil from beneath his feet. However, as the story progresses, it is revealed that the blessed man doesn't cure anyone without someone paying him at least five dirhams and becomes angry if even one dirham is given to him which is why he ignored Khuḍayrah's daughter. Furthermore, it is revealed that the holy man doesn't possess powers. In this story, Nuri criticizes both the religious class and religious leaders that exploit the poor and their faiths in times of poverty and the people's blind faith in them.

== See also ==
- Iraqi literature
