= Abd al-Karim Qasim Museum =

Historic museum in Baghdad, Iraq

- Arabic: متحف عبد الكريم قاسم
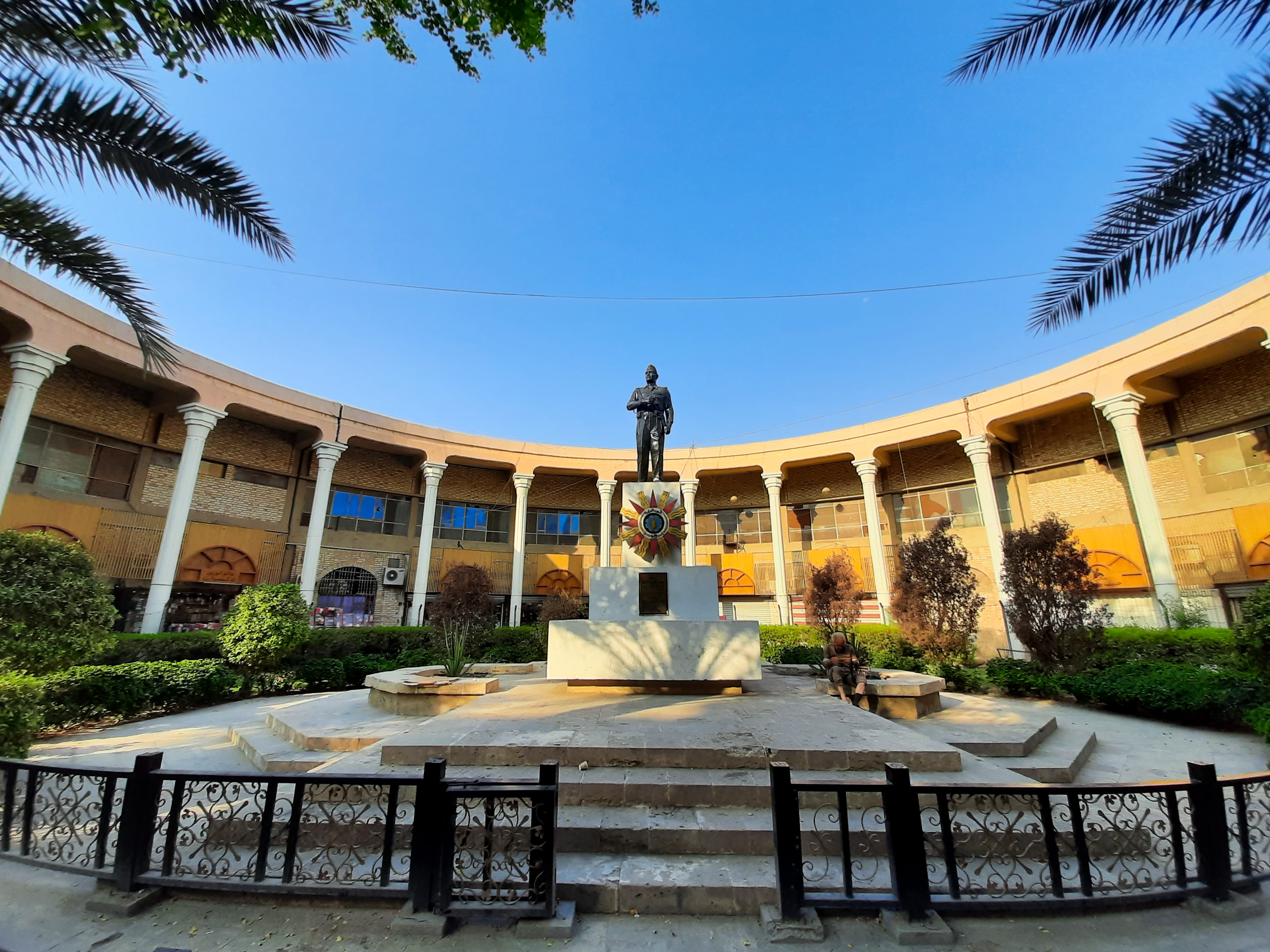
- The museum which includes a statue dedicated to the leader.
- Established: 2015
- Location: Baghdad, Iraq
- Coordinates: 33°19′41″N 44°24′17″E
- Type: history museum
- Collections: Belongings of Iraqi leader Abd al-Karim Qasim

The Abd al-Karim Qasim Museum (Arabic: متحف عبد الكريم قاسم), also known as al-Za'em Museum (Arabic: متحف الزعيم), is a museum in Baghdad, Iraq, dedicated to former Iraqi leader Abd al-Karim Qasim. The museum is located in one of the heritage houses located on al-Rasheed Street in Baghdad. The opening, which coincided with the anniversary of the assassination of Qasim on 9 February, was attended by his family and loved ones, as well as official, academic, and cultural figures. The goal of the museum is to preserve the history of various eras Iraq has gone through.

== History ==
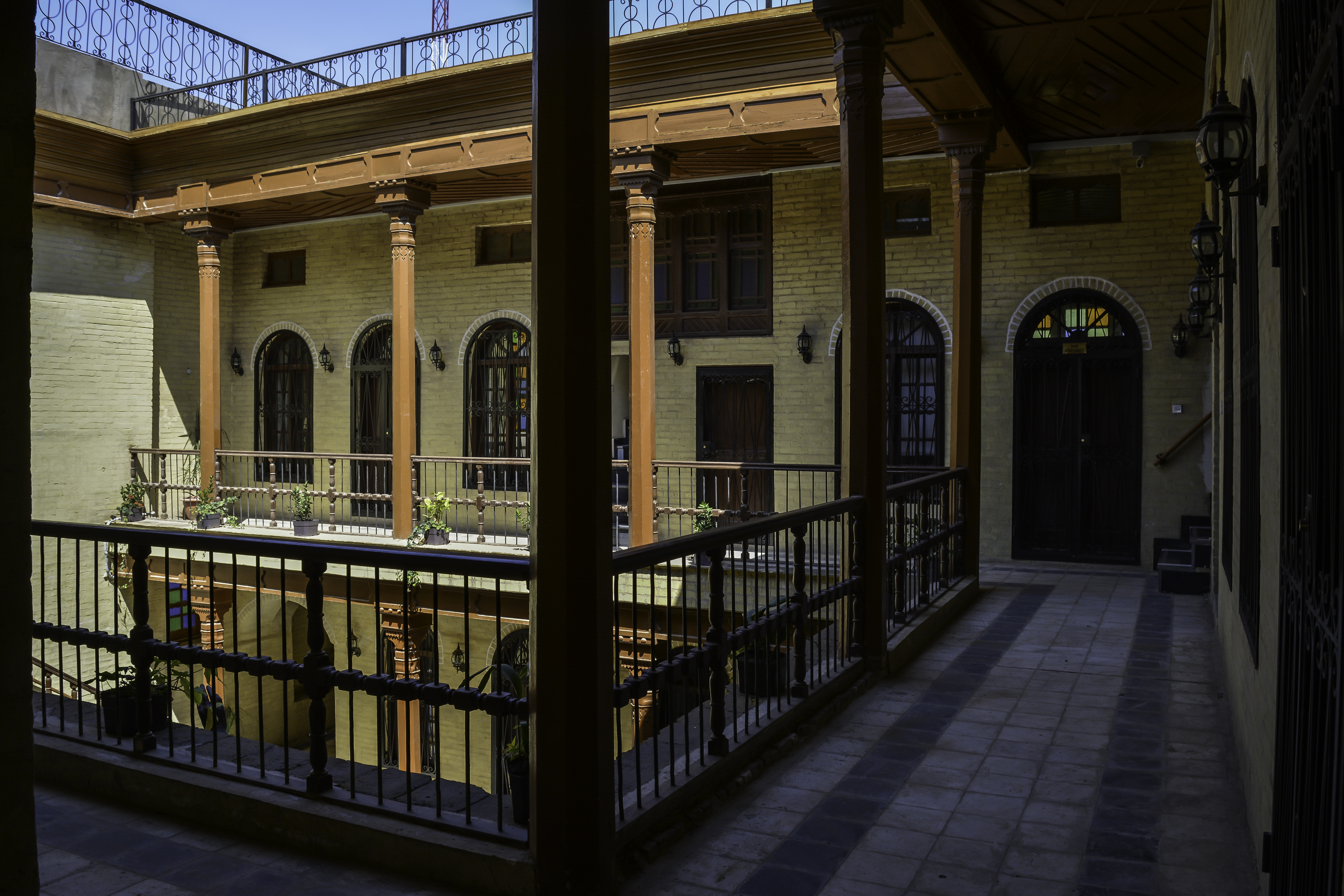
The inside of the house.

The building of the museum was originally a house established by a merchant named "Abd al-Jabbar al-Khudairi" in the late 19th century. It at one point belonged to Halil Kut of the Ottoman Empire. The house became a distinguished heritage building in terms of planning, architectural elements, distinguished woodwork, shanasheel, and the neighborhoods where the house was located. The Ministry of Tourism maintained the house and revived it as a heritage museum for Abd-al Karim Qasim. The museum contains Qasim's personal belongings and rare gifts. After maintenance, the museum was opened on 9 February 2015, and was attended by his family and loved ones, as well as official, academic and cultural figures. The museum was opened to preserve the history of the country so that future generations can be aware of it. It also hinted that a similar museum in Basra dedicated to poet Badr Shakir al-Sayyab could be opened. The museum includes five halls, the first of which included the personal belongings of the leader, and the other was allocated for gifts, weapons, archives, and documents.

== Content ==
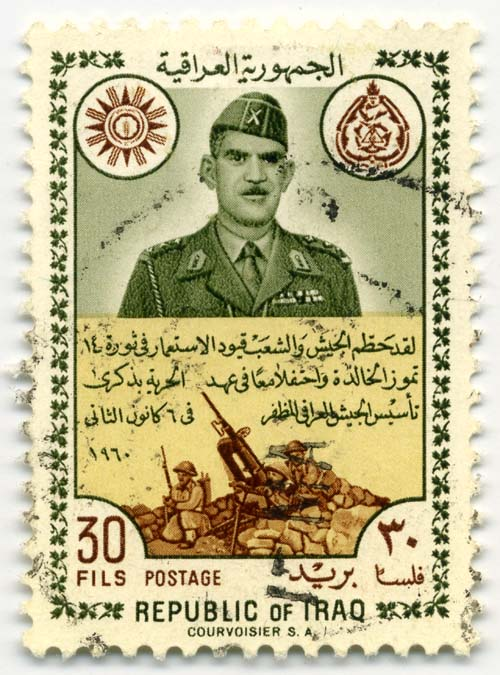
A stamp bearing the image of Qasim.

The museum reflects on the life of Abd al-Karim Qasim and displays his personal belongings, documents, and special gifts. These gifts were ones he was given by both local and Arab personalities. Some of those include his military clothes (Including a summer one in khaki color, and a dark one made of wool, which is usually used by army men in the winter and bears his military rank), sixteen Qur'ans that he received as gifts, various medals, including military medals, fountain pens he used, rifles and pistols he used during his military life, in addition to a personal card issued on 20 August 1961. There's also an armored car. A bag containing shaving tools is also on display. The museum also includes a bronze statue of Abd al-Karim Qasim designed by artist Khaled al-Rahal.

There are also gifts from the Soviet Union, including a small bag containing types of alcoholic beverages, as well as various films. As well as gifts from the International Red Cross and Red Crescent Movement. Some of the gifts consist of silver and copper pieces engraved with Qasim's image.

== See also ==
- Baghdadi Museum
- Iraq Museum
