= Stefano Bianca =

Swiss architectural historian

Stefano Bianca is a Swiss architectural historian and an urban designer. Bianca has been published in the fields of Islamic architecture, cities, gardens and arts.

He is currently working as Director of the Historic Cities Support Program.
