= Baghdad Jewish Community Center =

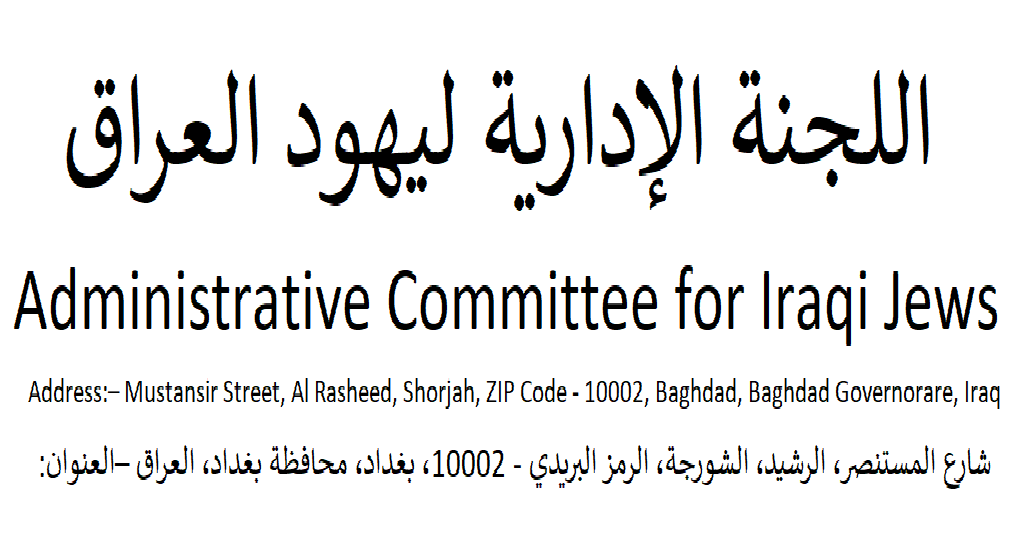

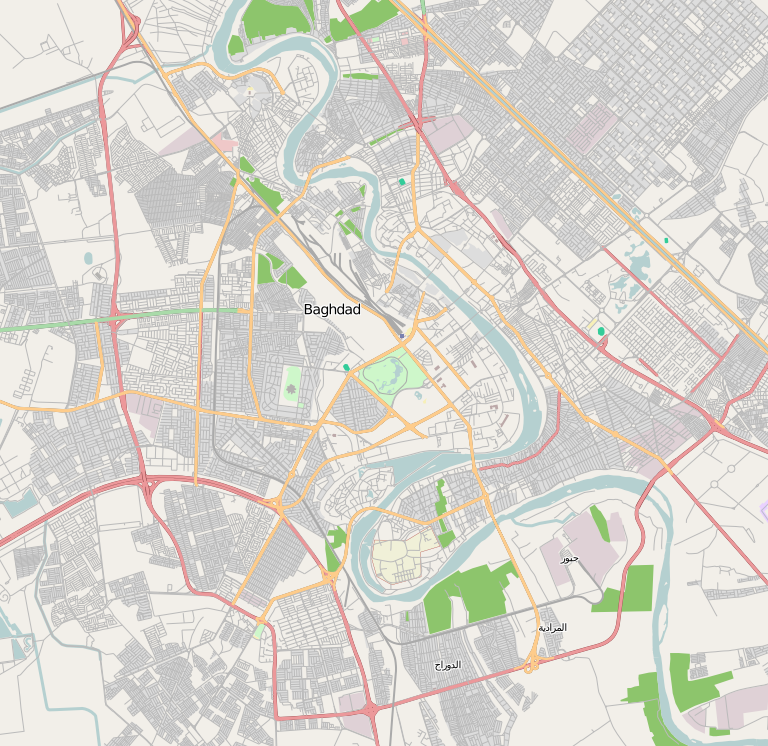
- Formation: 1973
- Legal status: Affiliated to government (1973–2003); Independent (2003–present)
- Headquarters: Baghdad, Iraq
- Parent organization: Administrative Committee for Iraqi Jews

Baghdad Jewish Community Center, officially known as the Special Committee for the Religious Affairs of Ezra Menahem Daniel, is a Jewish institution in the city of Baghdad, Iraq. Located in the historic district of Baghdad, it has played a significant role in preserving the heritage and religious practices of the city's Jewish community.

== History ==
Historically, Baghdad was home to a significant Jewish community, which played a vital role in the city's commercial, cultural, and social life. However, following mass emigration in the early 1950s due to political and social changes, the Jewish population dwindled significantly.

Iraq's policies towards Jewish property and citizenship have fluctuated over the years. Following the exodus of Iraqi Jews in the mid-20th century, the government passed laws regulating the use and management of Jewish-owned lands and buildings. The 1970 Law No. 55 placed Jewish agricultural lands under the administration of the General Secretariat for Frozen Assets, leasing them to agricultural reform authorities. However, this law was later repealed in 1971, as the need for these lands diminished.

The center has also played a role in preserving the legacy of prominent Jewish benefactors such as Ezra Menahem Daniel. The Iraqi government has, at times, overseen Jewish endowments and assets through legal frameworks such as the 1970 and 1971 laws on land and property management. In 1973, a special committee was established to administer the properties of Ezra Menahem Daniel, ensuring that revenues were used in accordance with Jewish religious stipulations for charitable and communal purposes. In 1975, the Iraqi government issued Decision No. 1293, which formally allowed Jews who had left Iraq since 1948 to return. The decree guaranteed returning Jews full citizenship rights, emphasizing Iraq's commitment to human rights and non-discrimination. However, in practice, very few Jews returned, and the community remained small.

Local Muslim residents have played a role in safeguarding Jewish religious and cultural sites in Baghdad. During the widespread looting of 2003, community members and volunteers repelled multiple attempts to ransack the Jewish Community Center and a nearby synagogue. During the 2003 Iraq War, as looting became widespread in Baghdad, the Jewish Community Center was targeted. In an incident reported on April 14, 2003, local Muslim residents intervened to protect the center from looters. Individuals such as Hassam Kassam and Hossam, the center's guard, acted to deter intruders. Neighbors took additional measures by removing identifying signs to make the building less conspicuous. This protection underscored the historical coexistence and solidarity between Baghdad's Jewish and Muslim communities. A self-defense militia was formed in the Batawin district to protect houses, including Jewish properties, from bandits.

== Location ==
The Baghdad Jewish Community Center is situated in a white-painted house off Al-Rashid Street in the old town of Baghdad. This area has historically been home to significant religious and cultural institutions, including synagogues and other Jewish communal properties. Nearby, in the Batawin district near the Saddun commercial artery, a synagogue remains under the protection of local residents. A self-defense militia was formed during the looting crisis to safeguard the synagogue and other properties in the area, ensuring that no harm came to these historic sites.

== See also ==
- Iraqi Jews
- Menahem Saleh Daniel
