= Afifa Iskandar =

Iraqi actress and singer (1921–2012)

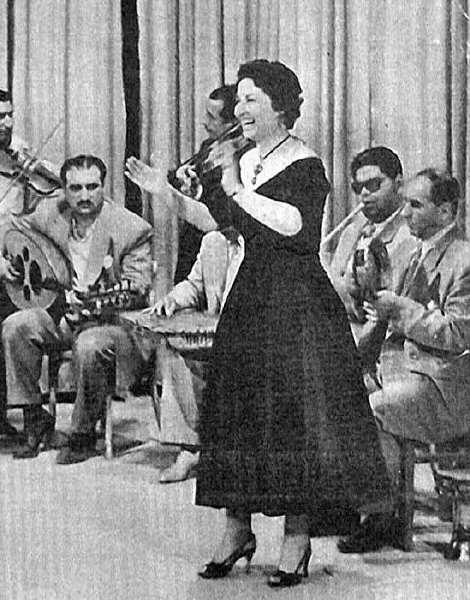
- Afifa Iskandar at an Alshaab Hall party in Baghdad in the 1950s

Background information
- Born: Afifa Iskandar Estefan; 10 December 1921; Mosul, Mandatory Iraq
- Origin: Armenian
- Died: 21 October 2012 (aged 90) Baghdad, Iraq
- Cause of death: Cancer
- Genres: Iraqi maqam
- Occupations: Singer, actress
- Instrument: Vocal
- Years active: 1935–2011
- Labels: Shahrora, monologist

Afifa Iskandar Estefan (Arabic: عفيفة إسكندر إصطيفان, 10 December 1921 – 21 October 2012) was an Iraqi singer and actress, active from the mid-1930s to the first decade of the 21st century.

She was considered one of the most popular female singers in Iraqi history and was nicknamed the "Iraqi Blackbird".

== Biography ==
Afifa Iskandar was born in Mosul to an Armenian father and a Greek mother. She lived in Baghdad, and started singing at the age of five. At her first party in 1935, she sang Iraqi maqam music.

At the age of twelve, she married an Armenian man, named Estafan Iskandar, and took his last name. Iskandar also worked as an actress and appeared in many productions.

In 1938, she traveled to Egypt to work with Badia Masabni, Taheyya Kariokka, and Mohamed Abdel Wahab.

Iskandar died of cancer on 21 October 2012 in Baghdad.

== Tribute ==
On 10 December 2019, Google celebrated her 98th birthday with a Google Doodle.

== Singles ==
Iskandar sang nearly 1,500 songs. These include:

- "Ya aqqid alhajibayn"
- "Ikhlas meni"
- "Ya sokari ya assali"
- "Ared Allah yebain hobty behom"
- "Qaleb qaleb'"
- "Jani alhlo labs sobhyat aledd"
- "Nem wa sadek sadri"
- "Msafren"
- "Qsma"
- "Helal eid"
