= Haydar-Khana =

Haydar-Khana محلة الحيدرخانة
- Neighborhood
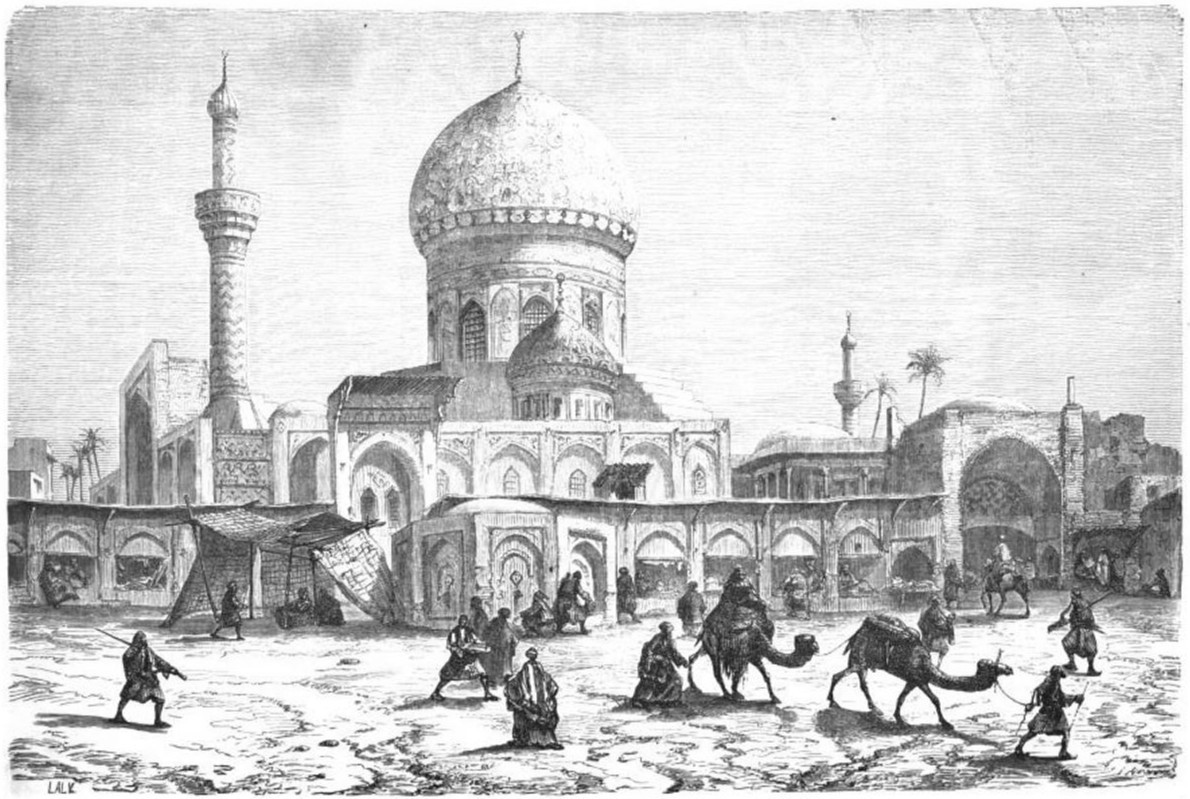
- Illustration of the Haydar-Khana area, featuring its main mosque and marketplace, 1861.

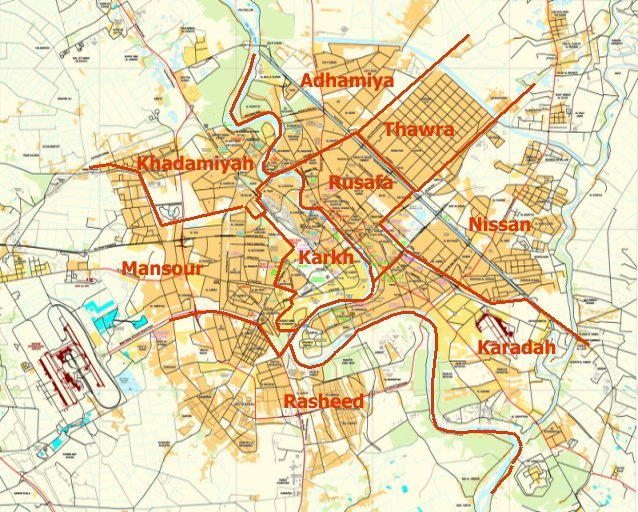
- Country: Iraq
- Governorate: Baghdad Governorate
- First settled: Abbasid Caliphate
- Time zone: UTC+3

Haydar-Khana (Arabic: محلة الحيدرخانة) is an old quarter and neighborhood located in Baghdad, Iraq. Located at the beginning of al-Rashid Street and near al-Maidan Square, it is one of the oldest quarters in Baghdad, dating back to the Abbasid Caliphate. It was also home to many modern notable figures of Iraq such as Iraqi artist Nazem al-Ghazali and former-Iraqi Prime Minister Nuri al-Said.

== Etymology ==
The word "Khana" means "residence" or "dwelling" in Persian while the origins of the name "Haydar" is disputed, but its first attestation is the given name of the Sogdian Iranian prince of Usrushana, better known as al-Afshin. The name is attributed to a Sufi man who went by the name of "Haydar" whose history is unknown, although it was later attributed to Haydar Pasha Jalabi Shabandar, an Iraqi notable who established Hammam Haydar in the locality in 1650 and is buried in the same place along with some members of his family. However, there's no historical evidence that ties Shabandar and the Haydar-Khana's name together.

== Historical background ==
=== Medieval period ===
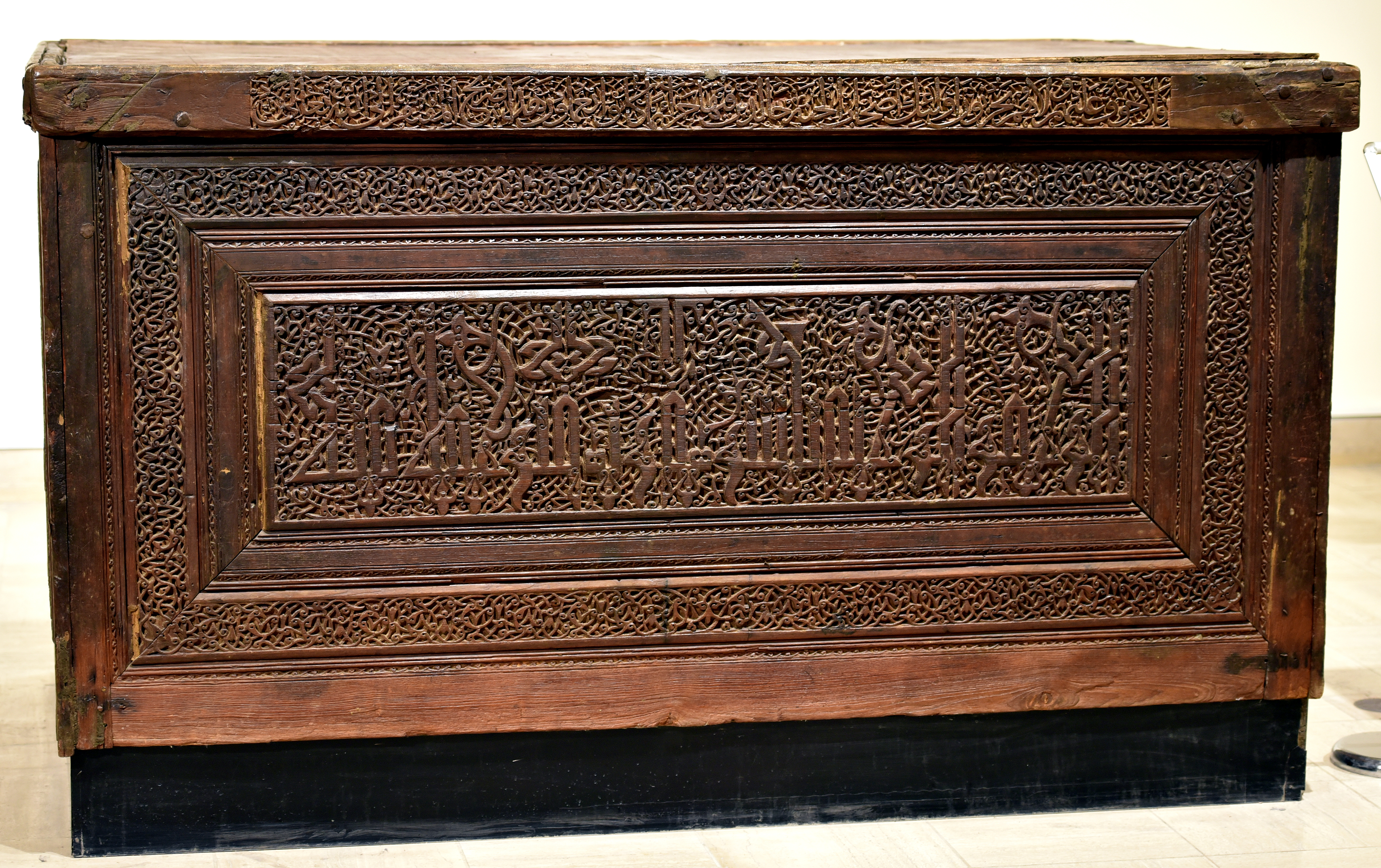
14th-century wooden cenotaph of scholar Ibn al-Aquli from the Haydar-Khana area, currently in the Iraq Museum.

In the Abbasid era, the neighborhood's old name was "Souk al-Thulatha" and was the site of an old marketplace, which was its namesake. The area had several passageways which would later turn the marketplace into its own quarter. The areas in the quarter were named after its passageways such as the Darb al-Khabazin (later al-Aquliyya), Darb al-Dinar (later al-Ma'mun Street), and Darb Zakha (later a section of al-Mutanabbi Street). Around this time, Abbasid Caliph al-Nasir built a mosque next to the marketplace which was renovated several times later.

Darb al-Khabazin was part of the Souk al-Thulatha quarter. The present name comes from the Ilkhanate al-Aquli Mosque which was formerly the house of the Islamic scholar and Shafi'i jurist Ibn al-Aquli, a teacher at the Mustansiriyya Madrasa who died around 1327. Ibn al-Aquli endowed his home for students who learnt Qira'at and was buried in it after his death. Later, also in the Ilkhanate period, the house was converted into a Friday mosque with a brick minaret built above it. Several awqaf have been established within it since. The wooden cenotaph of Ibn al-Aquli, which dates back to the Ilkhanid period, is currently held in the collection of the Iraq Museum. The present mosque has a concrete cenotaph over the grave of Ibn al-Aquli.

=== Ottoman period ===
Later, in the Ottoman Empire, the area gained two names. In the 17th-century it was known as "Souk al-Sultan", while in the 16th-century the quarter gained its current name of Haydar-Khana. The name Haydar likely comes from a Sufi named Haydar who had his own takiyya in the area at an unknown date. While Haydar's history is unknown, the takiyya likely influenced the name of the quarter. The marketplace also became known as "Souk Haydar-Khana," which stretched from al-Maidan to al-Aquliyya. In 1673, Ottoman viceroy of Baghdad, Hussein Pasha al-Silahdar, built a mosque in the quarter named the Hussein Pasha Mosque.

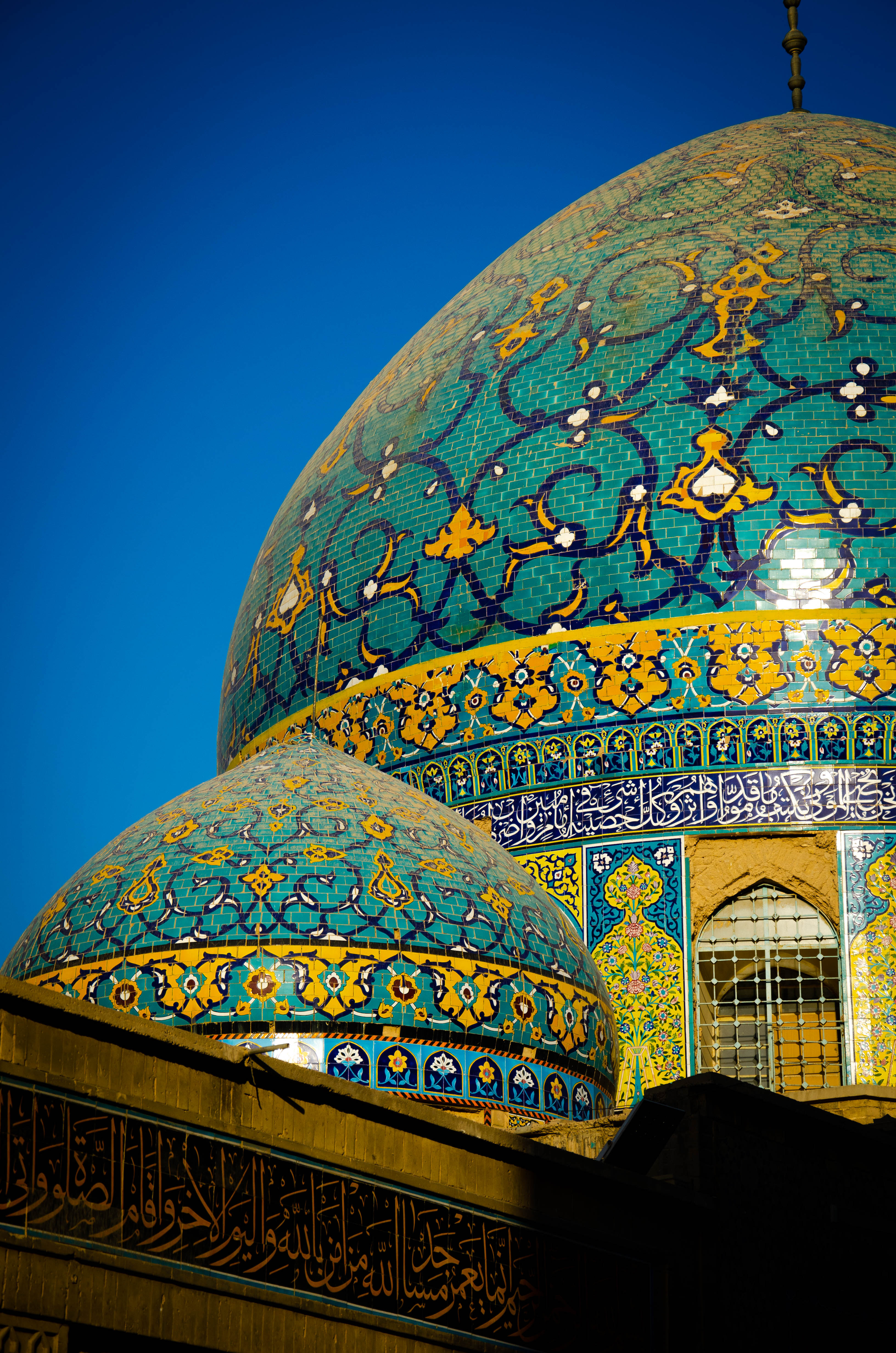
Domes of the Haydar-Khana Mosque.

In 1825, the Ottoman-Mamluk viceroy completely rebuilt the old Abbasid mosque. The mosque became known as the Haydar-Khana Mosque, and became recognized as one of the most largest and most notable landmarks built in Baghdad during the Ottoman period. It contained a large blue Persianate dome with two smaller domes next to it, several gates decorated with tiles, arabesque and Qur'anic calligraphy art, and a traditional Iraqi minaret.

=== British imperial period ===
In 1920, Baghdad's notables gathered in the mosque, which kick-started the Iraqi Revolt against British colonialism of Iraq. It was nicknamed by Iraqis the "Revolution Mosque." The Mosque witnessed many arrests by British forces, as it was a major center for the uprisings that were launched from al-Rashid Street.

== Notable landmarks ==
=== Religious landmarks ===
==== Al-Aquli Mosque ====
Al-Aquli Mosque (Arabic: جامع العاقولي) is one of the oldest mosques in Baghdad and was built in 1327. The mosque is characterized by several domes connected, and the domes rest on four columns of brown alabaster, in addition to the domes resting on the surrounding walls.

==== Haydar-Khana Mosque ====
Haydar-Khana Mosque (Arabic: جامع الحيدر خانة) is the most well-known landmark in the locality. The mosque represents a great historical and revolutionary symbol for Iraqis, as it hosted many demonstrations against British forces. The mosque includes a Madrasa for teaching Islamic sciences and a library containing works by the country's most prominent scholars. Due to its age, it was also a tourist attraction.

==== Hussein Pasha Mosque ====
Built in 1673 by Hussein Pasha al-Silahdar, the mosque is located in the quarter.

==== Shrine of Ahmad ibn Hanbal ====
The shrine of Ahmad ibn Hanbal, founder of the Hanbali school of thought, is located in the quarter inside the Arif Agha Mosque.

=== Notable houses ===
==== Home of Ahmed Pasha al-Bazarkan ====
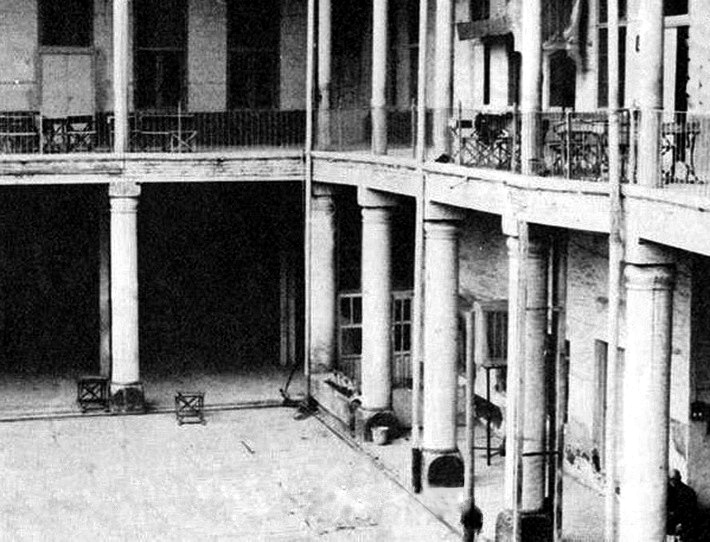
The Shamash School, 2 January 1950.

Located opposite the Haydar-Khana Mosque, 1690 to 1693 Ottoman viceroy of Baghdad, Ahmed Pasha al-Bazarkan, owned a house in the quarter. The house was converted, after its heirs sold it following World War I, into the Shamash School and then the Iranian school before it was abandoned.

==== Home of Nazem al-Ghazali ====
One of the most well-known areas of the locality among its locals is the home of artist Nazem al-Ghazali.

== Present day ==
Despite Haydar-Khana being one of the poorest neighborhoods in Baghdad, it was the home of many prominent Iraqi personalities and poets, such as the artist Nazem al-Ghazali and poets such as Jamil Sidqi al-Zahawi. Poets recited poems in the Haydar-Khana Mosque, and Iraqi Jews lived in the quarter and had an influence in the area for a while. It is also home to the oldest families in Baghdad. Coffeehouses such as al-Zahawi Café and Hasan 'Ajami Café in the locality were widespread and became havens for artists, writers, poets, and intellectuals.

The locality currently suffers from neglect and its narrow alleyways and roads are filled up with litter. A lot of the apartments have also been abandoned and parts have been turned into warehouses. It is also bordered by al-Jumhuriyya Street.
