= David Patrikarakos =

British writer

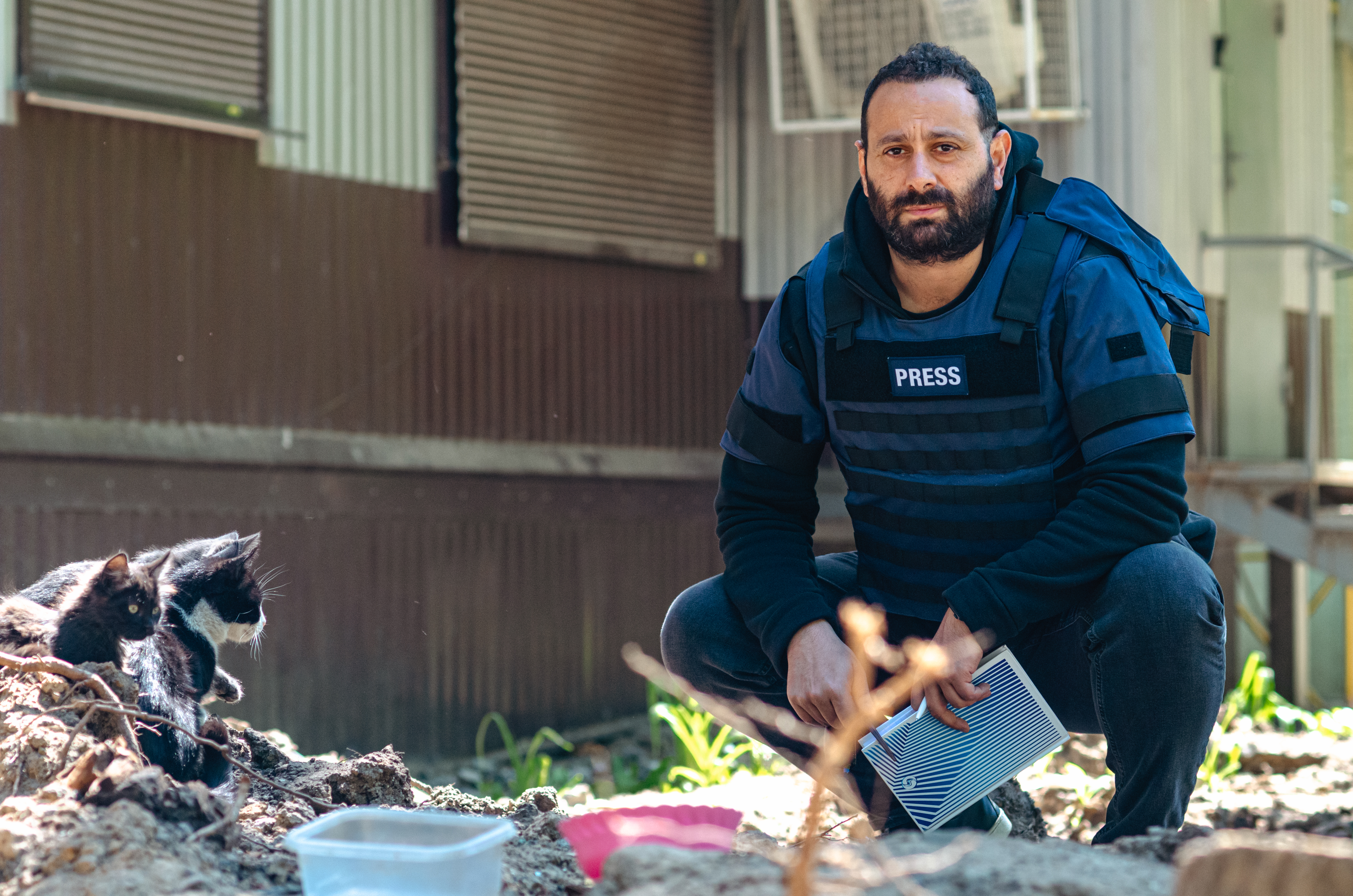
- David Patrikarakos in Kharkiv, May 2022
- Born: London, United Kingdom
- Occupations: Author, journalist
- Notable work: War in 140 Characters: How Social Media is Reshaping Conflict in the Twenty-First Century

David Patrikarakos is a British author, journalist, podcaster and war correspondent, best known as the author of War in 140 Characters: How Social Media Is Reshaping Conflict in the Twenty-First Century. He is the Daily Mail's Special Correspondent and foreign correspondent for the online magazine UnHerd.

== Background ==
Patrikarakos was born in Hampstead and attended University College School. He has been described as a British-Greek-Jewish-Iranian-Iraqi. Via his father, he is descended from the Greek revolutionary leader and statesman Georgios Sisinis, while his mother's side includes a long line of Sephardi rabbis including Abdallah Somekh, who codified kosher laws for Baghdadi Jews throughout India and the Far East, and the de facto chief Rabbi of Babylon, Yosef Hayyim. Patrikarakos's great-grandfather, Reuben Somekh was Member of Parliament for Basra under the British Mandate in Iraq. Sylvia Kedourie and Elie Kedourie were also cousins.

Patrikarakos has written about growing up as the child of exiles, for whom London was not just a home but a "refuge."

== Author ==
After post-graduate studies at Wadham College, Oxford, in 2012 Patrikarakos published Nuclear Iran: Birth of An Atomic State, a full history of Iran's nuclear ambitions. Nuclear Iran was named as a New York Times Editor's Choice and nominated for the 2013 Total Politics Book Awards.

His second book, War in 140 Characters: How Social Media Is Reshaping Conflict in the Twenty-First Century, drew from Patrikarakos' time embedded with forces in the Russo-Ukrainian war and reporting on the 2014 Hamas-Israel conflict, Operation Protective Edge and ISIS, to explore the increasing role played by social media in modern conflict. It was also the first book to explore the work of Eliot Higgins and Bellingcat, who would gain prominence following the 2018 poisoning of Sergei and Yulia Skripal. On its publication in 2018, Patrikarakos' book was widely reviewed in the international press, including by Ben Judah in The Times, who wrote that "War in 140 Characters should be mandatory reading at Sandhurst". In the book, Patrikarakos uses the concept of what he terms Homo Digitalis, the individual that is networked, globally connected, and able to wield disproportionate power. The book was optioned by producer Angus Wall for development as a TV series.

=== Influence on Military Thought ===
In January 2018, the incoming head of UK Chief of the Defence Staff, Sir Nick Carter concluded his first major policy speech at Royal United Services Institute by calling on the 77th Brigade to observe the lessons of Patrikarakos' book.

War in 140 Characters was placed on the reading lists for the Munich Security Conference and the UK's Royal Air Force Centre for Air Power Studies and singled out as essential reading by US Naval Commander Admiral Foggo at an October 2018 meeting of the Atlantic Council.

The UK Ministry of Defence used the book as part of its "information Advantage" concept note while NATO placed the book on its reading list for non-commissioned officers and junior officers.

== War correspondent ==
Patrikarakos began his career as a war correspondent by reporting on war in the Democratic Republic of Congo and has also reported on the Peshmerga's fight against ISIS in Northern Iraq.

He has covered the war in Ukraine since its beginnings in 2014, and was the first western journalist in the occupied city of Sloviansk, on 12 April 2014, which signalled the beginning of Russia's military invasion of eastern Ukraine.

In February 2022 just before Russia's full-scale invasion of Ukraine, the Wall Street Journal selected War in 140 Characters as one of the "7 Books That Explain Why Russia Wants Ukraine." Since then, Patrikarakos has visited all three fronts of the war in the south and east. He embedded with Ukrainian special Forces during the Battle of Bakhmut, where he reported from the battle while on crutches and wearing an ankle brace following a foot injury.

In June 2023, while embedded with a drone unit, a video tweet thread of Patrikarakos running through the eastern front lines under heavy shelling went viral on Twitter.

== Journalist ==
Patrikarakos has been a Contributing Editor at the Daily Beast and Contributing Writer at Politico Europe.

He is a recipient of the Washington DC based Transatlantic Leadership Network "Freedom of the Media" Gold Medal award for Investigative Reporting awarded to a foreign news organization or individual.

== Awards ==
- 2012, Political Book Awards, International Affairs Book of the Year, finalist. Nuclear Iran: The birth of an Atomic State
- 2018, British Army Military Book or the Year, finalist, War in 140 Characters, How Social Media is Re-Shaping Conflict in the Twenty-First Century
- 2023, Transatlantic Leadership Network Winner. "Freedom of the Media" Gold Medal award for Investigative Reporting awarded to a foreign news organization or individual.
- 2025, Radio Academy Audio and Radio Industry Awards (Arias), shortlist, 90 Seconds to Midnight, Best News Or Current Affairs.
