= Aida Bamia =

American scholar of Arabic literature

Aida Adib Bamia
- Born: Jerusalem
- Citizenship: United States
- Education: University of London
- Employer: University of Florida
- Known for: Scholarship in Arab literature and Arab to English translations.

Aida Adib Bamia is professor emeritus of Arabic language and literature at the University of Florida in Gainesville. She is a specialist in North African literature. Her work on Arabic literature has helped to bring quality translations to English readers.

== Biography ==
Bamia is Palestinian. She was born in Jerusalem and lived in Egypt post-1948. She received her Ph.D. in 1971 from the University of London (School of Oriental and African Studies-SOAS). From 1972-1973, Bamia received a Ford Foundation grant to work on a post-doctoral fellowship at the University of California, Los Angeles (UCLA).

In 1985, she began teaching at the University of Florida. Prior to being hired in Florida, Bamia taught at various universities in Algeria.

Later, Bamia pursued and received American citizenship; she considers herself an Arab American. However, she has also stated: "when I did finally settle down in the US I discovered that a house, a car and the freedom to travel wherever I wanted did not fill the void within...I still have some hope of returning to a Palestine I can call home, not a land under occupation which my American citizenship allows me to visit as a tourist."

Bamia's research has focused especially on Muslim women writers from the Middle East. She has shown that women significantly contributed to culture and literature, even in early Islamic times, and she hopes to combat stereotypes about Arab women through her writing and research. She has also studied oral poetry traditions of Maghribi women in North Africa.

She was the editor of Al-Arabiyya, the journal of the American Association of Teachers of Arabic (AATA). She was also a president of AATA in 1993.

She is the author of The Graying of the Raven: Cultural and Sociopolitical Significance of Algerian Folk Poetry (AUC Press 2001), which won the Middle East Award from the American University in Cairo Press in 2000.

Her translation work also received award nominations. In 2014, she was nominated for the Saif Ghobash Banipal Prize for Arabic Literary Translation for her translation of The Arch and the Butterfly by Mohammed Achaari.

She is currently a visiting professor at the University of Michigan.

== Works ==
- "Refusing to Melt in Their World", World and I
- The Inheritance, Sahar Khalifeh, Translator Aida Bamia, American University in Cairo Press (December 30, 2005) ISBN 978-977-424-939-6
- Papa Sartre, Ali Bader, Translator Aida Bamia, (AUC Press 2009).
- The Graying of the Raven: Cultural and Sociopolitical Significance of Algerian Folk Poetry (AUC Press 2001).
- "Feminism in Revolution: The Case of Sahar Khalifa". Tradition, Modernity, and Postmodernity in Arabic Literature. Leiden, The Netherlands: Koninklijke Brill NV. 2000. ISBN 9789004117631.
