= Al-Aquli Mosque =

Old Ilkhanid mosque in Baghdad, Iraq

Coordinates: 33.3425°N 44.3912°E

- جامع العاقولي

Religion
- Affiliation: Islam
- Ecclesiastical or organisational status: Active

Location
- Location: Al-Rusafa in Baghdad
- Country: Iraq

Architecture
- Minaret: One

Al-Aquli Mosque (Arabic: جامع العاقولي) is an old Ilkhanid period mosque located in the Haydar-Khana quarter of al-Rusafa in Baghdad, Iraq. The mosque was formerly the house of medieval Muslim scholar and Shafi'i jurist Ibn al-Aquli which also contains his tomb behind the mosque. The mosque became the namesake for the Aquliyya neighborhood surrounding it.

== Historical background ==
=== Background ===
Born on 25 January 1241, Jamal al-Din ibn Muhammad Ali ibn Hamad ibn Thabit al-Wasiti al-Aquli al-Baghdadi, also known simply as Ibn al-Aquli, was a follower of the Shafi'i school of thought who studied Hadiths. He later became a mufti at the age of seventeen and issued fatwas for the next 61 years. Al-Aquli eventually became a senior teacher at the Mustansiriyya Madrasa, one of the most prominent schools in Baghdadi history, to which he served many years teaching in it. He endowed his house to become an orphanage and a school for children that taught Qira'at. The house remained an orphanage even after his death in 1327.

=== Ilkhanate foundation (1327) ===
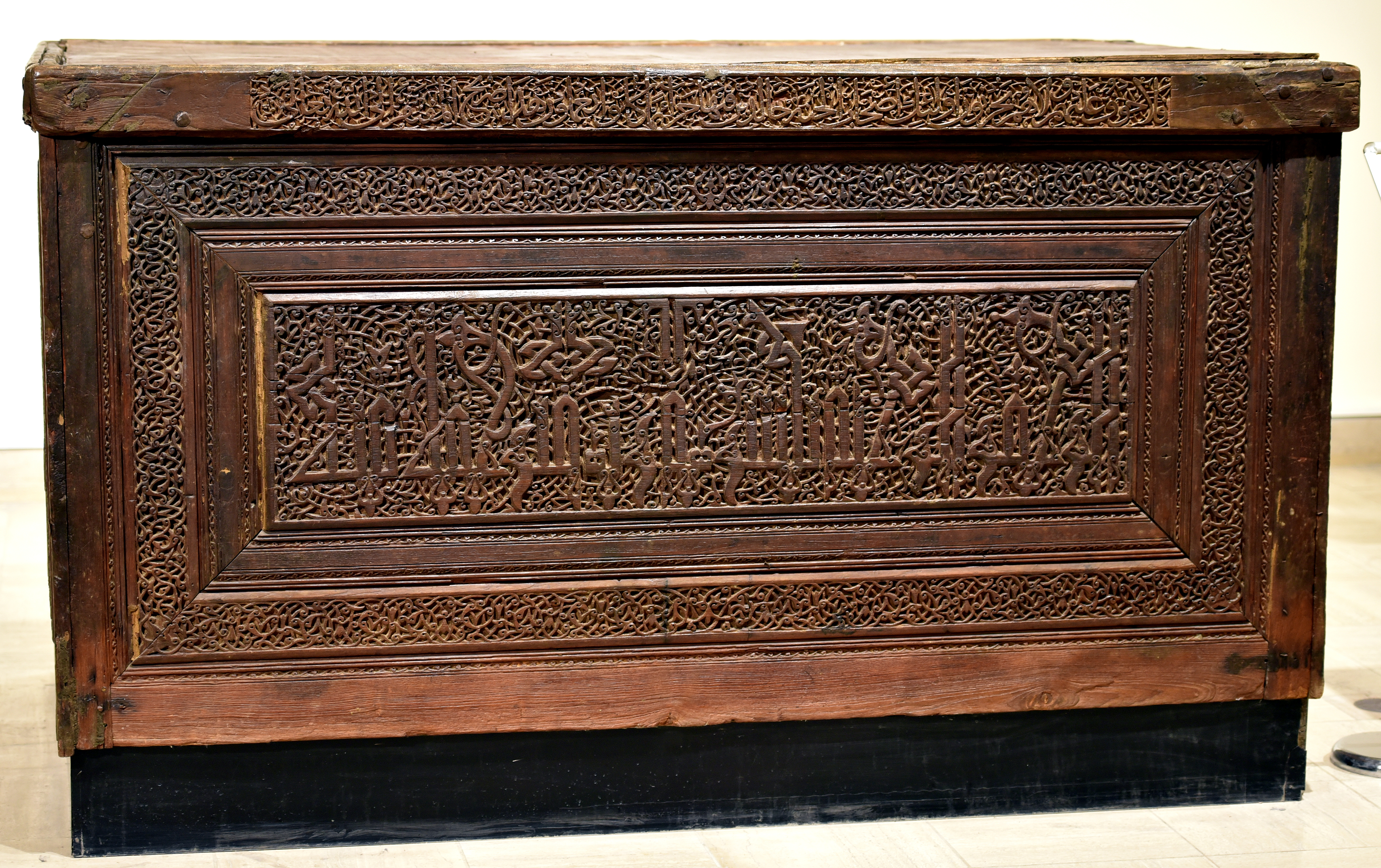
The 14th-century wooden sarcophagus of Ibn al-Aquli, currently in the Iraq Museum.

Upon Ibn al-Aquli's death in 728 AH/1327 CE, he was buried besides his residence. A mosque was then built next to his grave, incorporating the orphanage and his former residence into the structure. The mosque, especially its minaret, became a historical example of Mongol Ilkhanid construction in Iraq after the Mongol destruction of Baghdad in 1258, which historians agree began a long Dark Age in Iraqi history. Historical evidence suggests that, although the Mongols did destroy Baghdad, they also built inherited educational institutions and buildings. Al-Aquli Mosque being a significant surviving example alongside the Khan Mirjan and the minaret of the Tomb of Ezekiel in al-Kifl.

Above Ibn al-Aquli's grave was a wooden sarcophagus also dating back to the 14th-century Ilkhanid period. The passageway and neighborhood that the mosque is located in was known in Abbasid times as "Darb al-Khabazin" which was part of the "Souk al-Thulatha" quarter, modern day Haydar-Khana. The neighborhood eventually gained its name of "al-Aquliyya" in honor of Ibn al-Aquli and the mosque he's buried in, a name it still retains to the present day.

=== Ottoman period (1534–1918) ===
There have been several reconstructions of the mosque throughout the Ottoman period. In 1095 AH/1684 CE, the Ottoman viceroy of Baghdad Muhammad Pasha ordered its reconstruction. Followed by viceroy Omar Pasha, who ordered its renovation in 1117 AH/1802 CE. Lastly, Sulayman Pasha restored the mosque in 1163 AH/1850 CE. Due to the renovations, the minaret remained the only authentic part of the original Ilkhanid mosque.

== Present day ==
The main gate of the mosque.

The Ilkhanid minaret standing above.

The wooden sarcophagus of Ibn al-Aquli, which dates back to the Ilkhanid period, is currently held in the collection of the Iraq Museum. The present mosque has a concrete sarcophagus over Ibn al-Aquli's grave. Al-Aquli Mosque is currently held under the purview of the Sunni Endowment Office, although Shi'a Muslims are welcomed in. The Sunni Endowment Office restored the mosque in 2010. Currently, Friday prayers, Eid prayers, and all other prayers are held in it.

As of 2026, the mosque's caretaker is Abu Bakr Nasir Abd al-Karim who, in an interview with journalist Yusef al-Muhammadawi, talked that the mosque relies on donations for restoration effort. Due to the transformation of old parts of Rusafa from residential into a commercial center by the current Iraqi government, the mosque is only crowded during daytime while at nighttime the mosque is mostly empty due to lack of remaining residents following the Iraq War. Despite this, he said that restoration budget had sometimes reached one million Iraqi dinars which is way over the intended budget.
