= Haydar-Khana Mosque =

Historical mosque in Baghdad, Iraq

- جامع الحيدر خانة
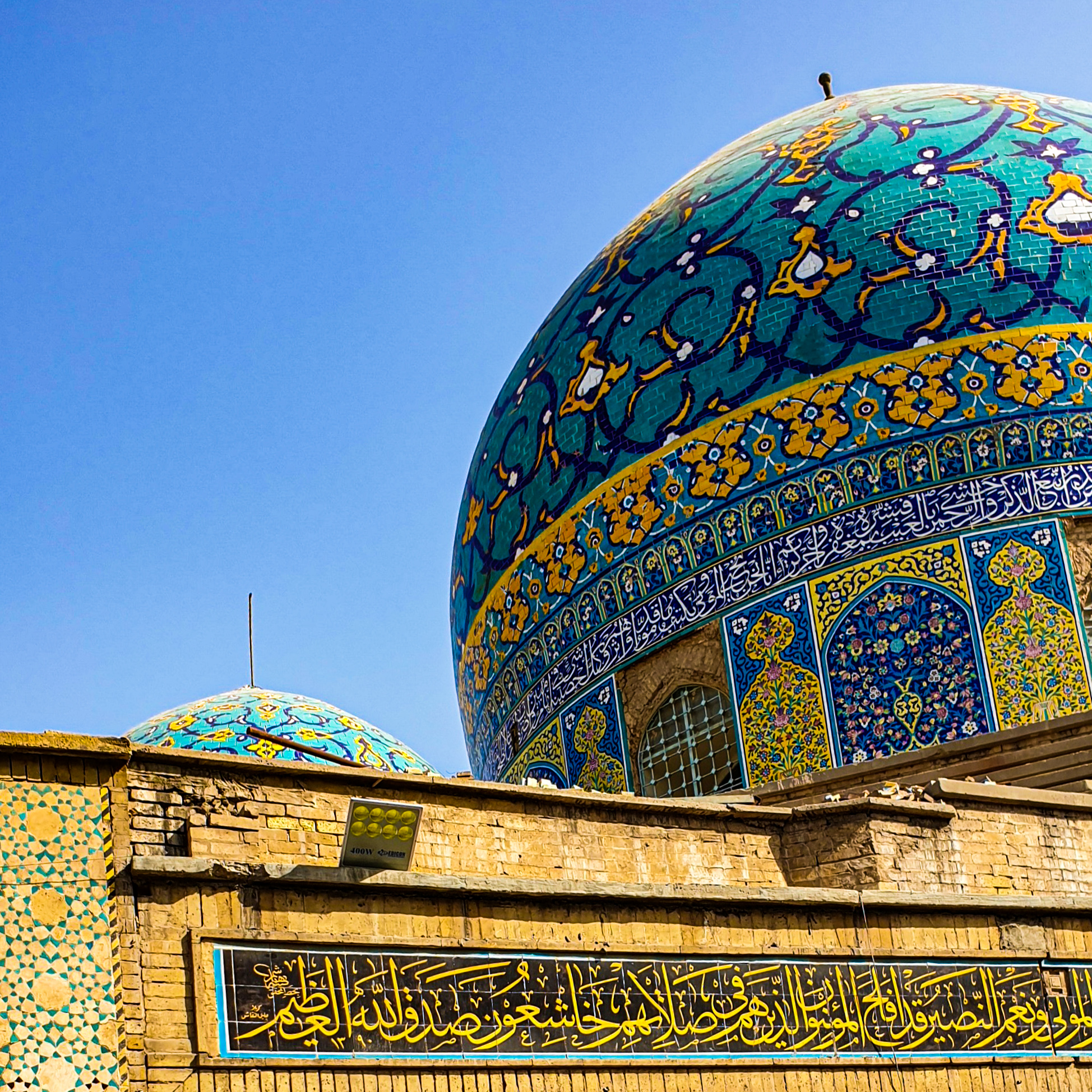
- Detail of the mosque dome in 2020

- Location of the mosque in Baghdad

Religion
- Affiliation: Sunni Islam
- Ecclesiastical or organisational status: Mosque and madrasa
- Status: Active

Location
- Location: Haydar-Khana, Baghdad, Baghdad Governorate
- Country: Iraq
- Interactive map of Haydar-Khana Mosque
- Coordinates: 33°19′30″N 44°25′19″E

Architecture
- Type: Mosque architecture
- Style: Abbasid; Ottoman
- Founder: Abbasid Caliph al-Nasir (12th-century); Dawud Pasha (1827)
- Completed: 12th century (prime); 1827 (reconstruction)

Specifications
- Dome: Three
- Minaret: One
- Materials: Marble; tiles

The Haydar-Khana Mosque (Arabic: جامع الحيدر خانة) is a mosque and madrasa, situated on al-Rashid Street in the Haydar-Khana district of Baghdad, in the Baghdad Governorate of Iraq. Originally built on top of a 12th-century mosque built by the Abbasid Caliph al-Nasir, the 19th-century mosque was built by the Mamluk Dawud Pasha. The mosque is one of Baghdad's most recognizable historical landmarks known for its architecture, role as a public sphere, and religious activities.

The mosque is considered important for its contribution to revolutionary ideas against British colonialism in Iraq. It is also a symbol for Iraqis as the center of national events of the religious, political and social diversity of the region.

== History ==
=== Construction history and context ===
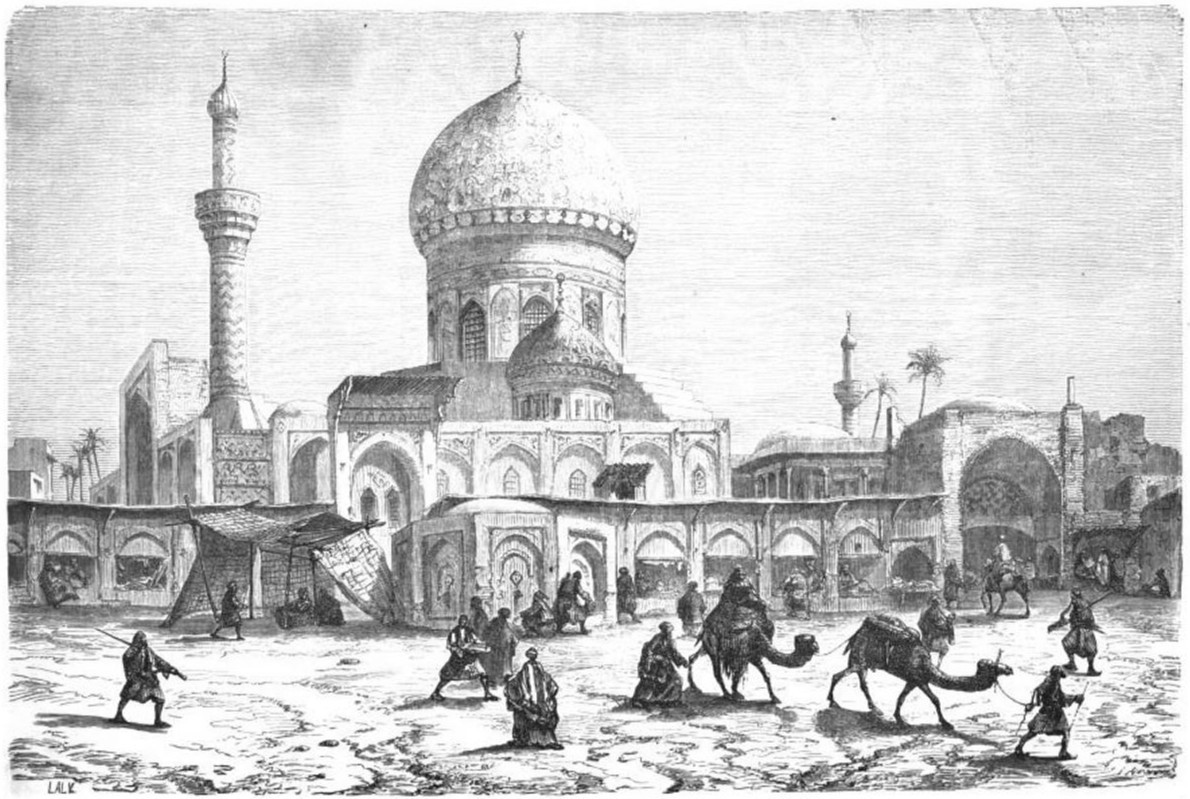
An 1861 sketch of the mosque

Prior to the current mosque, the Abbasid Caliph al-Nasir had led the foundations for a previous mosque in its place and its original name is attributed to an old unknown Sufi man named "Haydar." The mosque originally had a Sufi takiyya but it wasn't inside the mosque, instead it on a branch next to it. The name of the mosque later was attributed to a man named "Haydar Pasha Jalabi bin Muhammad Jalabi al-Shabandar" who was an Iraqi notable who established Hammam Haydar and is buried in the same place along with some members of his family. Although there are many folklore tales over the origin of the name. The modern mosque was later constructed and expanded during 1819–1827 in its current form by the Mamluk ruler of Baghdad Dawud Pasha, the last ruler of the Mamluk state of Ottoman Iraq.

Dawud Pasha established a madrasa in the same place, known as Madrasa al-Dawudiyya. There is also an attached library. Reconstruction and maintenance were carried out in 1827 during the reign of the Ottoman Sultan Mahmud II, again in 1890 by the then-Ottoman emir Abdul Hamid II. The square shaped mosque was considered the biggest mosque from the Ottoman era in Baghdad due to its size and area. Among the most well-known teachers who taught at the mosque's madrasa was the Islamic scholar Mahmud al-Alusi in 1905.

=== During the 20th century ===
The Haydar-Khana Mosque is usually nicknamed the "Revolutionary Mosque" by Iraqis due to its history of revolutionary gatherings and in spreading awareness, calls, and broadcasting of social issues to Iraqis as well as that of the religious and intellectual renaissance. In 1920, the notables of Baghdad gathered in the mosque in what marked the beginning of the Iraqi Revolt. The mosque was also a stage for many personalities who fought against the British Colonel rule including Mulla Uthman al-Mawsili who broadcast his sermons in the mosque, and moved people towards the revolution, as he made the mosque square a site for daily gathering of people and not just a worshipping place.

The first meeting in the mosque was held in 13 May during the Islamic month of Sha'ban. Notables from as far as Karbala have participated in its gatherings including citizen members of Sayyid Abd al-Razzaq al-Wahaab's membership that ran Karbala at the time. British forces responded by sending troops and armored cars continuously whenever there was a meeting. Violence breaking between the two sides would also lead to the death of at least one Arab Iraqi in the earlier meetings.

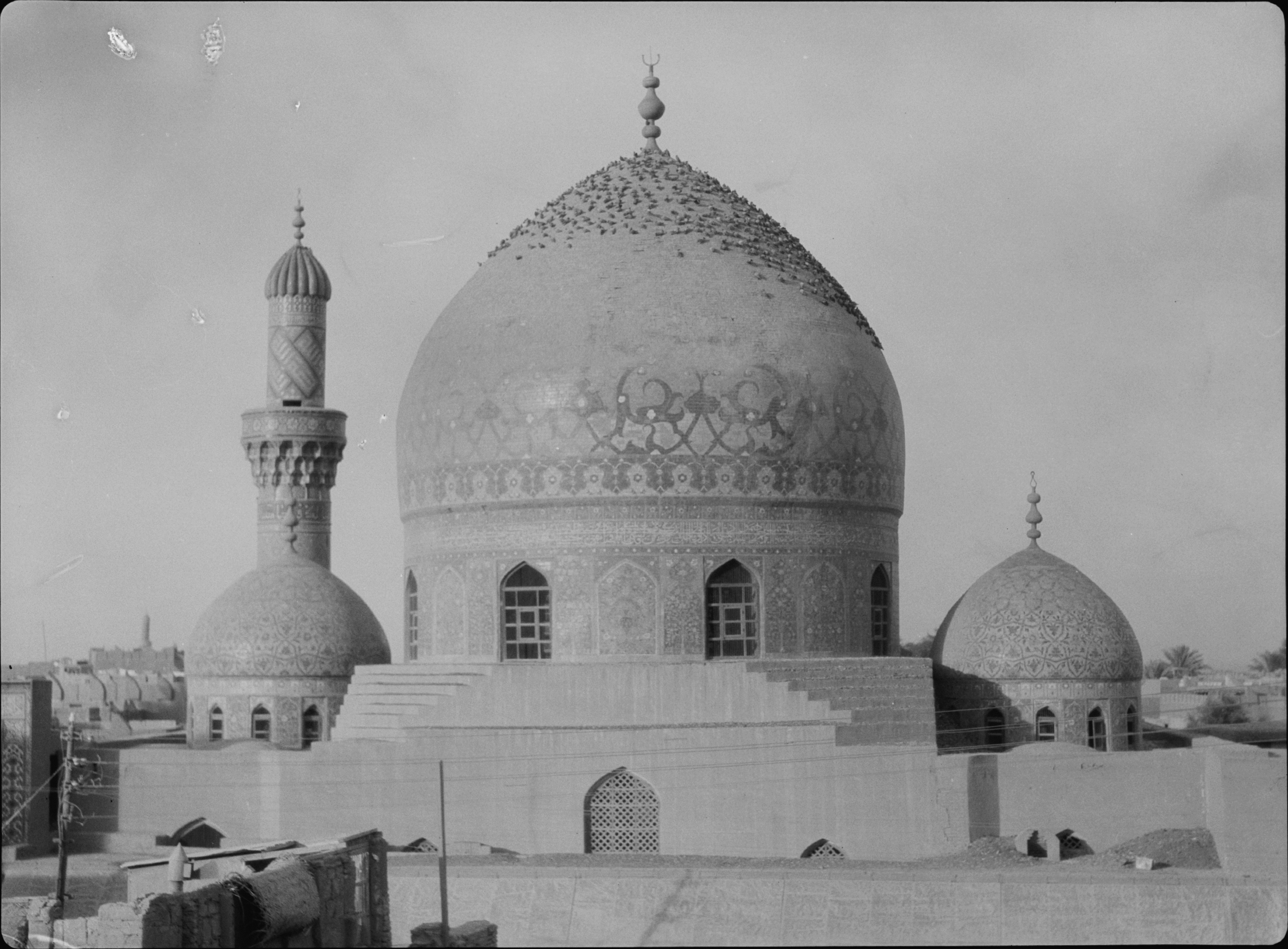
Haydar-Khana Mosque in 1932.

The enthusiasm and national spirit was running high during the gatherings, these were noted by Musa al-Shabandar when he visited the mosque during Mawlid. He also noted similar enthusiasm in other mosques celebrating Mawlid at the time such as al-Kadhamiyya Mosque. On June 24, 1920, a large demonstration was held in the mosque, where the poet Isa Abd al-Qadir read a poem in which he called for the solidarity and unity of Iraq. As a result, he was arrested by the British forces and exiled to Basra, the people became angry and the shop owners of al-Rashid Street closed their shops in condemnation of his exile.

These gatherings made the area of the mosque extremely crowded. Poets would also recite enthusiastic poems urging participation and confronting the British occupation. British occupation forces and soldiers stormed the mosque many times to arrest some personalities who enjoy a large mass and it caused Iraqis to face the occupation and the soldiers with simple weapons. The mosque remained a gathering ground for demonstrations even after the independence of the Kingdom of Iraq. The mosque was also inhabited by prominent personalities such as Nuri al-Said, al-Rusafi, Mohammed al-Shabibi, al-Zahawi, and Said Qazzaz.

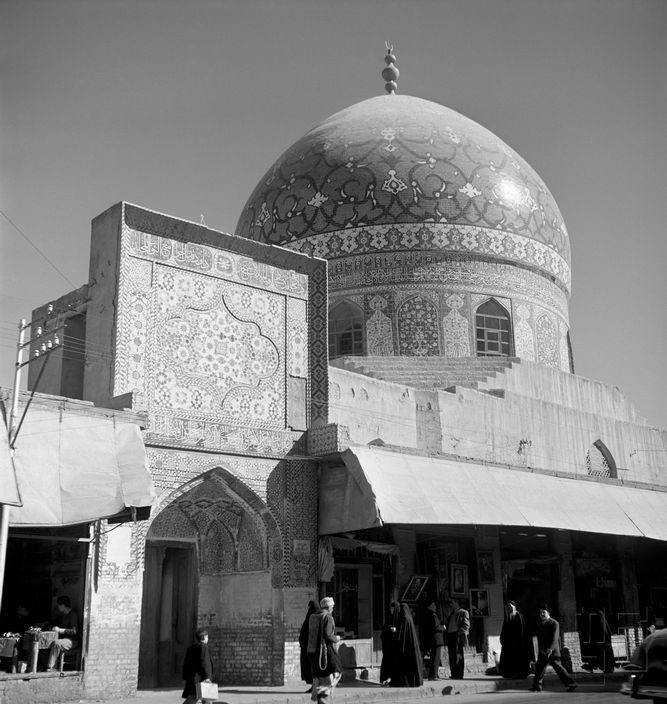
Shops inside the wall of the mosque in 1952, these shops have since been walled off.

An example of a demonstration in the mosque was when Ja'far Abu al-Timman boycotted the Iraqi elections of 1930 in protest against the Anglo-Iraqi Treaty. Al-Timman's political party, al-Hizb al-Watani, marched from their headquarters to the mosque and assembled in it. Later, the police arrived and attempted to arrest and stop the crowd. The leaders of the protest were sentenced to six months in prison while some protestors were given three months. Although cases some were quickly discharged.

During demonstrations against the Anglo-Iraqi Treaty of 1948 and British involvement in Iraqi politics, the brother of Iraqi poet al-Jawahiri, Ja'far, was killed in a gunfire on what is now al-Shuhada' Bridge. Forty days after Ja'far's funeral, al-Jawahiri climbed a ladder to the top of the mosque and recited one of the most famous Iraqi poems in Iraqi history before a crowd of thousands during a commemorative ceremony held at the mosque which took place 40 days after his funeral. This led the Haydar-Khana Mosque to become a rally ground against the British again. Al-Jawahiri's memorial for his brother at the mosque became a national event at the time.

The mosque was also located next to the gate to al-Mutanabbi Street and the Hajj Khalil Café. Its owner, Hajji Khalil al-Qahwati, prayed in the mosque daily and attended Friday prayers in it. The last renovation and reconstruction of the mosque was in the year 1972. During the reconstruction work, a stone was found on which it was written that a person named Hassan renewed the building of the mosque in 1792. During this period, the Iraqi master calligrapher Hashem Muhammad al-Baghdadi made calligraphy for the mosque.

=== During the 21st century ===
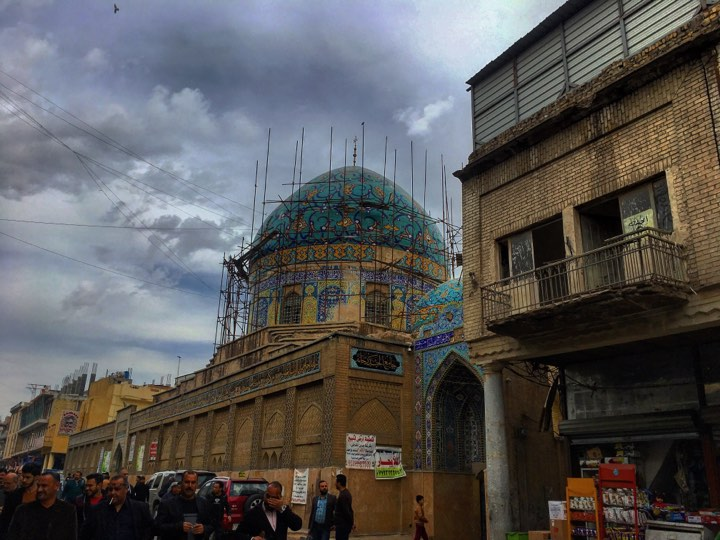
Haydar-Khana Mosque under overhaul in 2018

After the 2003 U.S. invasion of Iraq, many of the heritage sites and landmarks of Baghdad are currently suffering from neglect and encroachment and the Haydar-Khana Mosque is one of them despite its importance and significant role in Iraqi society. Parts of the mosque have started to fall apart including its outer stripes that include Qur'anic verses which were made by Hashem Muhammad al-Baghdadi. It is considered one of the greatest losses of Iraqi heritage. The Ministry of Culture, Tourism, and Antiquities declined to reconstruct and preserve the mosque due to its complex ownership.

In August 2019, controversy surfaced over pictures by the Iraqi makeup artist and model Jehan Hashim that depict her posing inside the mosque. While some Iraqis on social media didn't see the act as controversial, the Sunni Endowment Office announced that it was about to file a complaint against her and would launch an investigation. Stating that "a lawsuit will be filed against her, and that this act is outside the general context, and that mosques are places of worship and not for photography and parade." Hashim, in turn, defended her behavior, stressing that she did not intend to offend but wanted to "show the beauty of mosques in Iraq, whether in the north, south, or Baghdad, to tell those who follow me from other countries that we have beautiful mosques in which we pray, and that security is established in the country, and that mosques are not deserted and are available to everyone who wants to enter them." She also stated "I do not feel that what I did was a mistake, and I was wearing the hijab and a long and modest robe, as I have love for all religions, and I did not expect that my behavior would be disturbing."

== Description ==
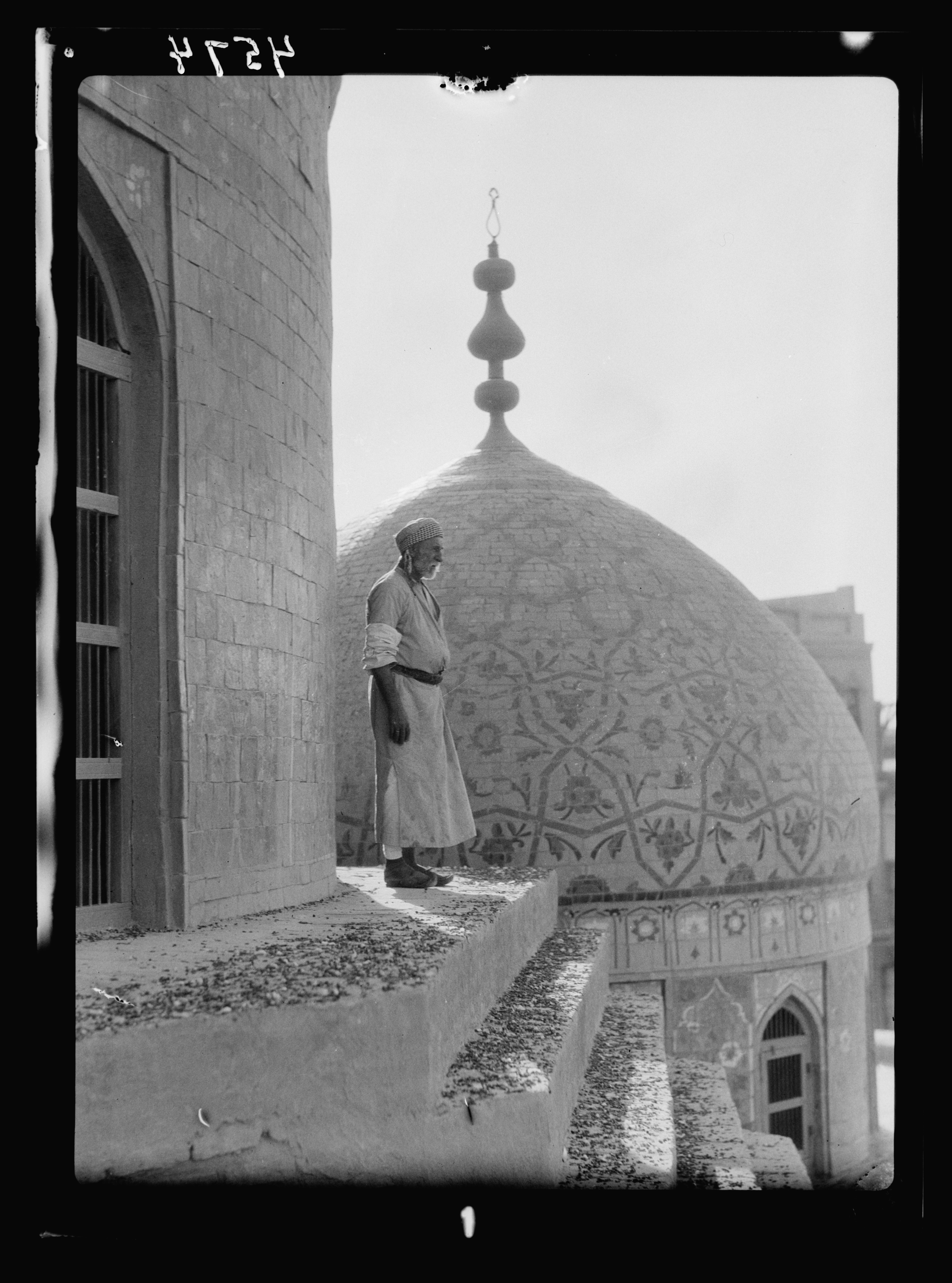
One of the smaller domes of the mosque in 1932.

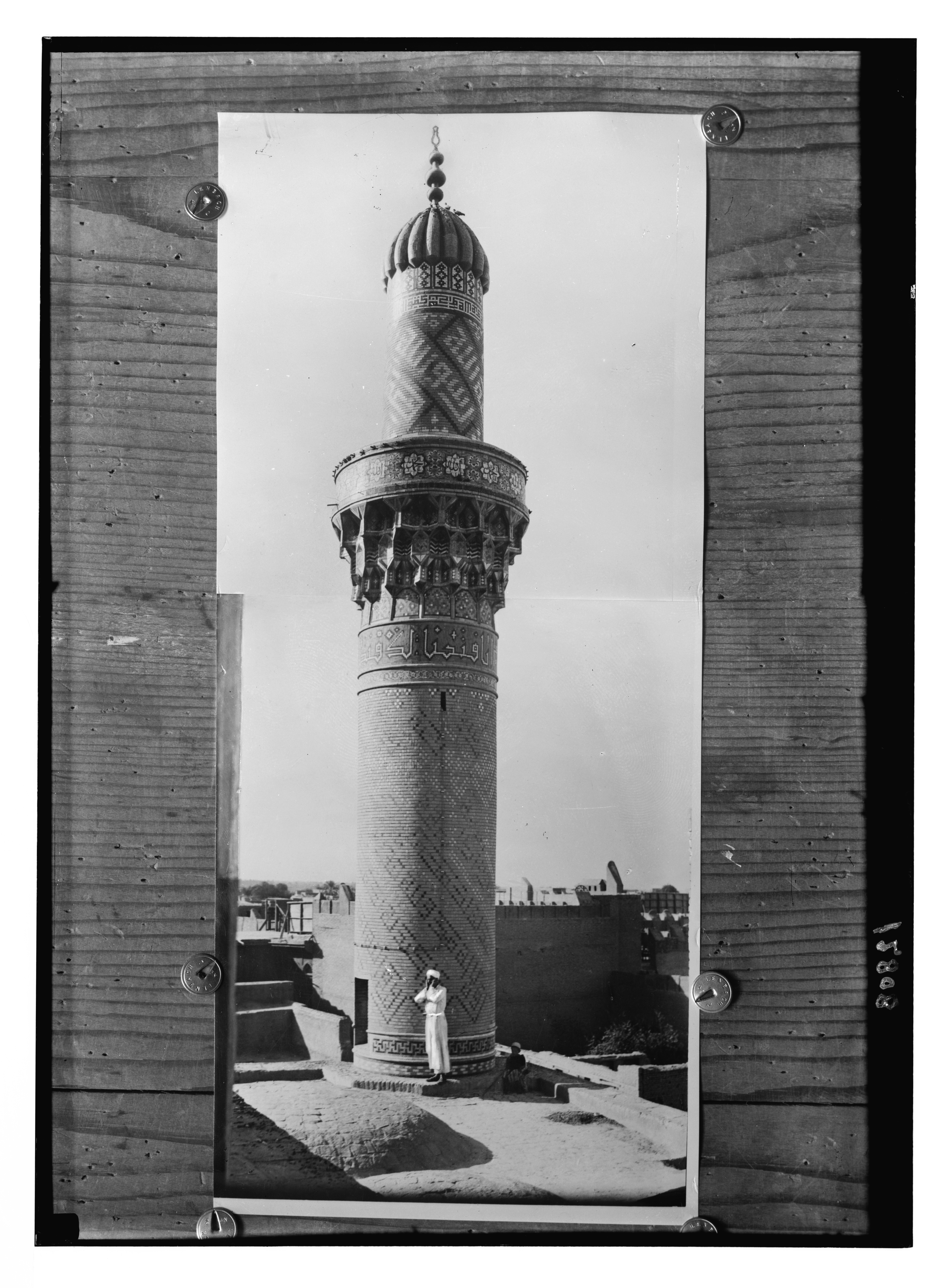
The minaret of the mosque in the 1940s featuring a muezzin.

The current structure of the Haydar-Khana Mosque is recognized by the locals as one of the finest examples of the Ottoman era constructions in Baghdad, and, in general, one of the most beautiful mosques in Baghdad.

=== Layout and interior ===
The mosque is square-shaped, and the three doors are made of marble. Inside the mosque, there are mushollas (prayer spaces) for summer and winter, and the winter chapel is topped by a massive façade blue dome with two smaller domes and a minaret surrounding it. The colors of the livery consist of blue and yellow. One of the reasons the mosque is considered fine in its structure is due to its seemingly perfect harmonious proportions as the prayer space is square in shape with the direction of the qibla facing al-Rashid Street directly. The calligraphy band on the exterior of the complex is made with kashi blue and gold tiles. The western part of the complex includes an iwan which serves as the main entrance to the building.

In front of the winter prayer space, there is a vaulted arcade surmounted by five small domes although three notable ones. This arcade has a large entrance in front of the door of the sanctuary, and to its side are four smaller entrances. The large entrance has a pointed arch that connects from the outside with another pointed arc above it, and between the upper and lower arches are pendants and stalactites in the middle of which is a Qur'anic verse. Taking into account the climatic conditions of the city of Baghdad, the walls are 2.5 metres (8 ft 2 in) thick. The Mosque also contains a number of madrasas of Islamic sciences and a library that contains works of the most prominent scholars of the city.

==== Gallery of the mosque exterior ====
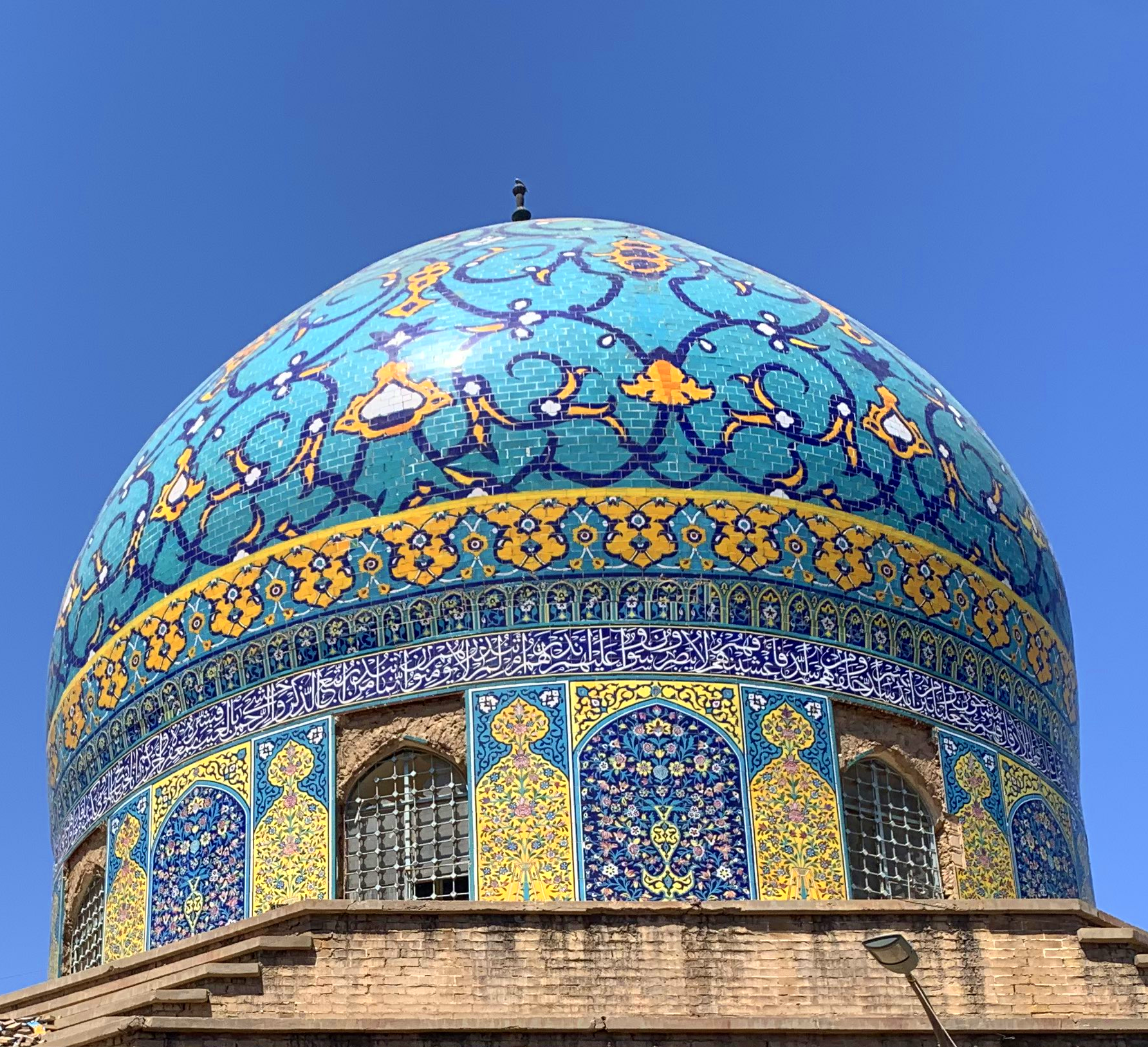
The main dome of the mosque which rests on a bricked portico

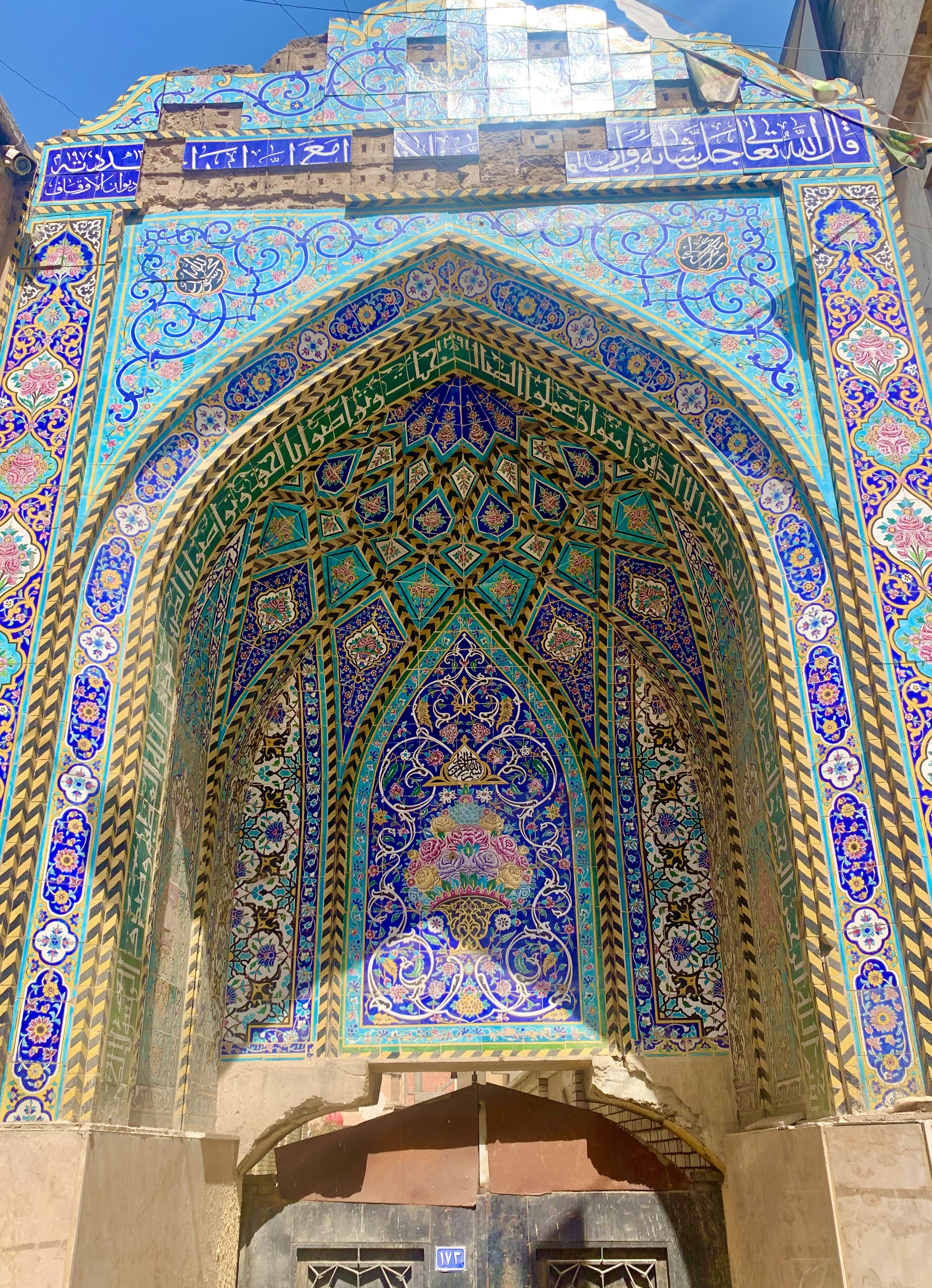
The first of the gates of the mosque

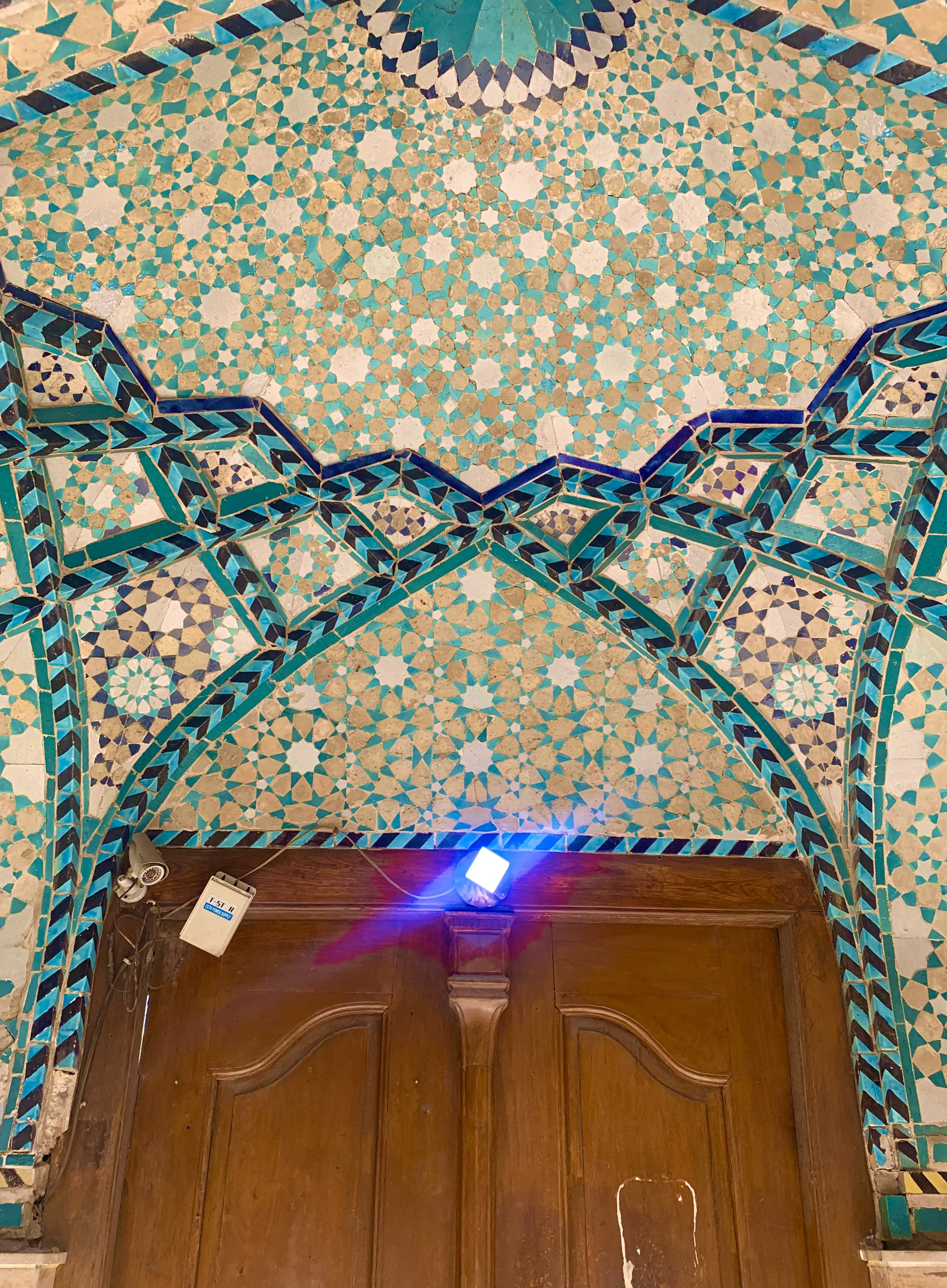
The second gate of the mosque

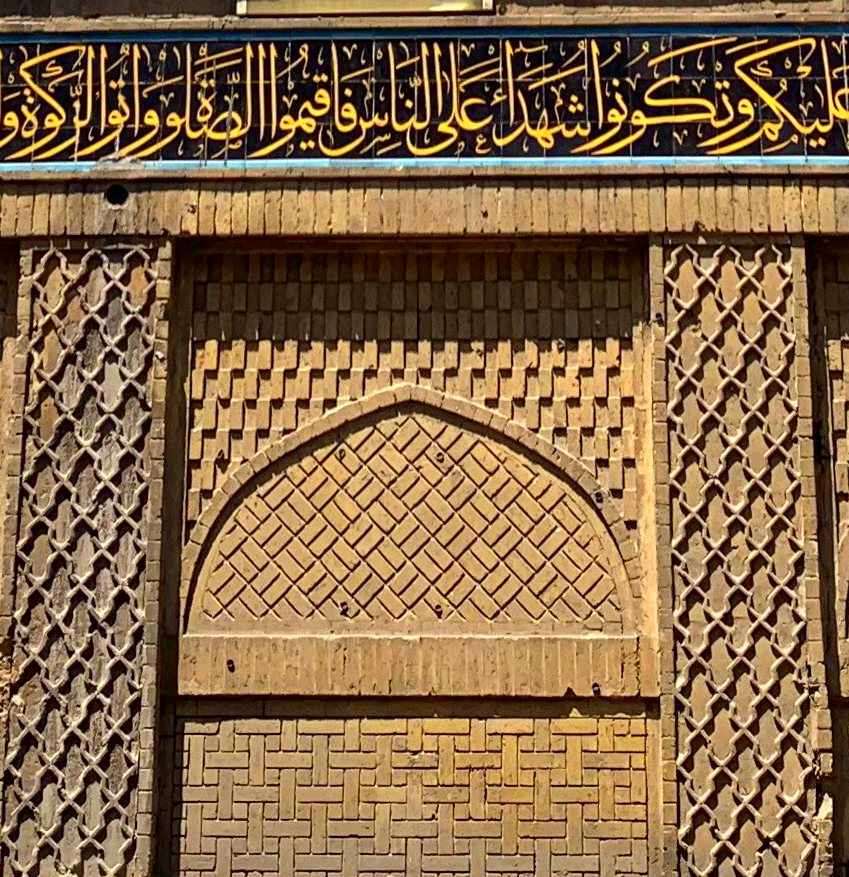
Exterior wall of the mosque that contains calligraphy

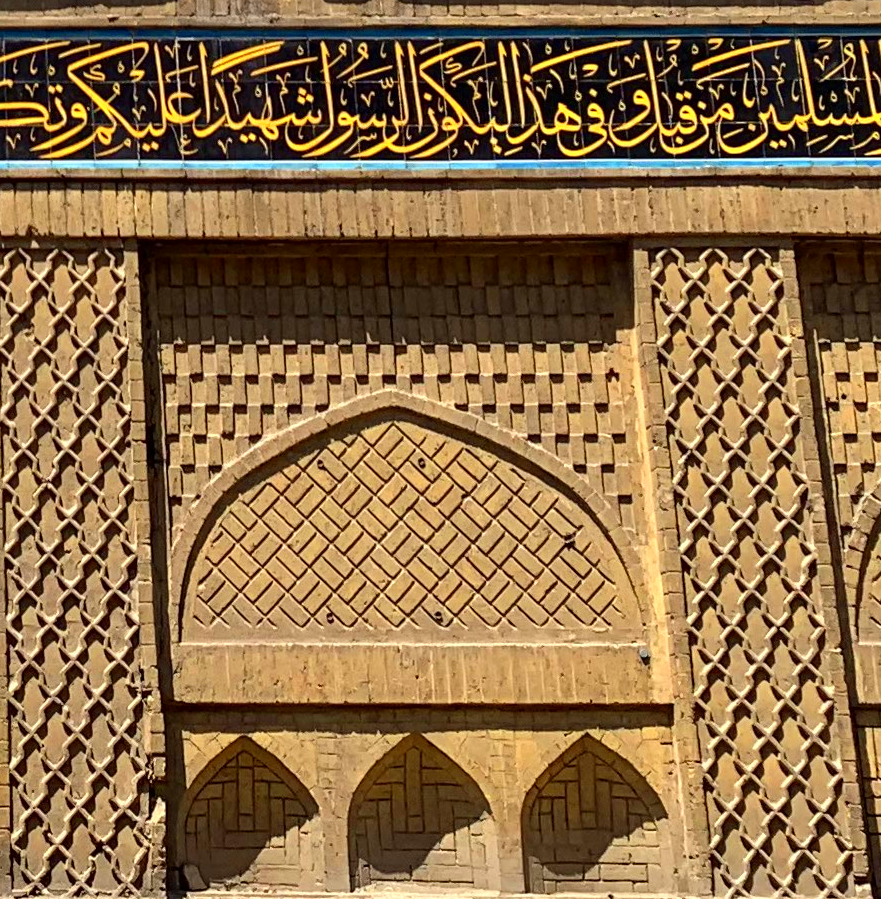
Another side of the exterior wall.

=== Ornaments ===
The main big dome, which rests on eight windows that make a cupola, is covered with arabesque motifs and inscriptions decorated using Kashi blue tiles. Inside the building's main cupola is a band of calligraphy under the windows. The minaret of the mosque is covered in kashi tiles and its basin rests on three bands of muqarnas with a blue ribbed dome topping the minaret. Under the big dome in the summer chapel, there's a mihrab made of colored bricks, and on either side of it are panels with pointed arches and writings in square Kufic script. There are also inscriptions that date the construction of the mosque.

==== Gallery of ornamentation ====
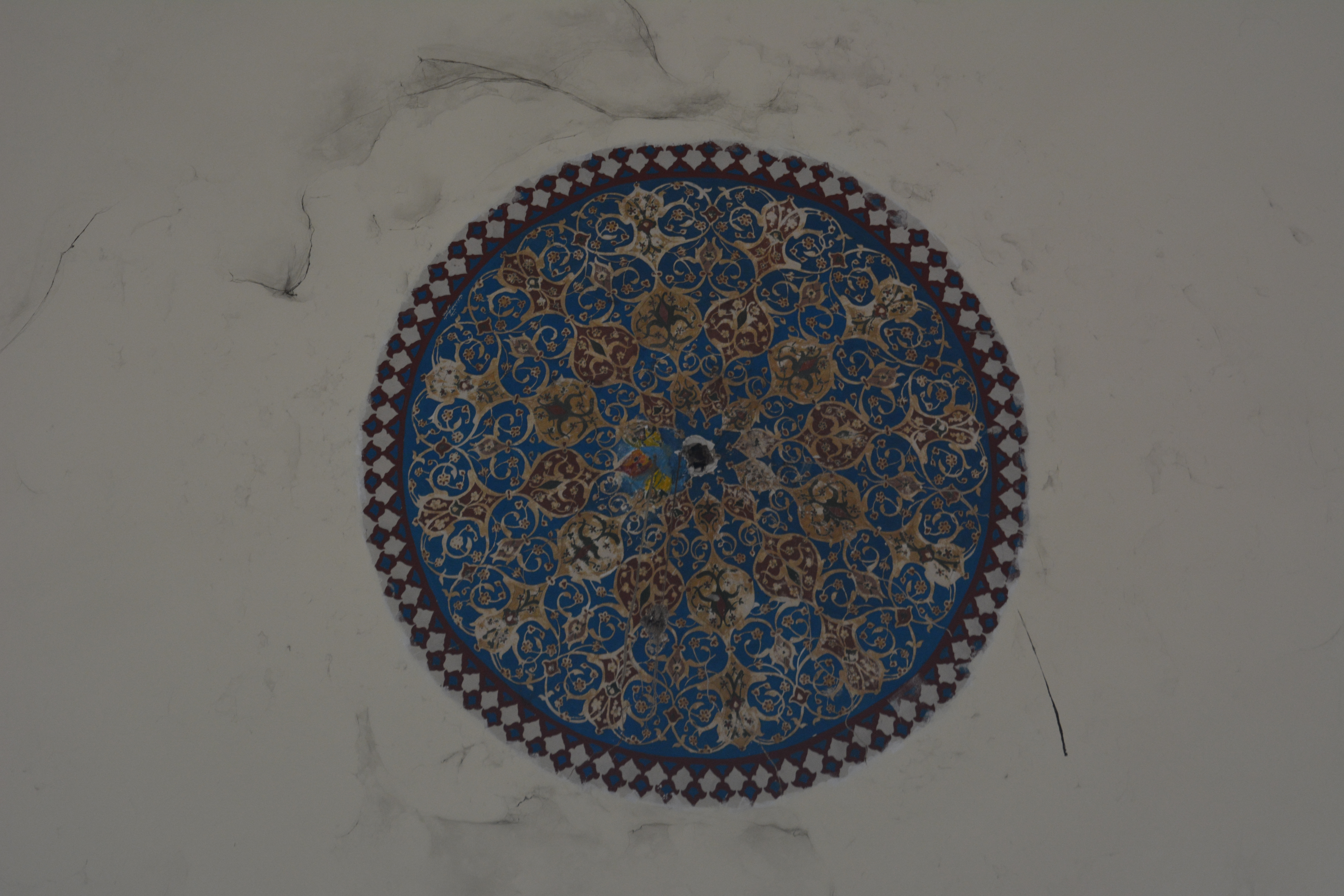
The only remaining interior decorations of the mosque's dome after decay

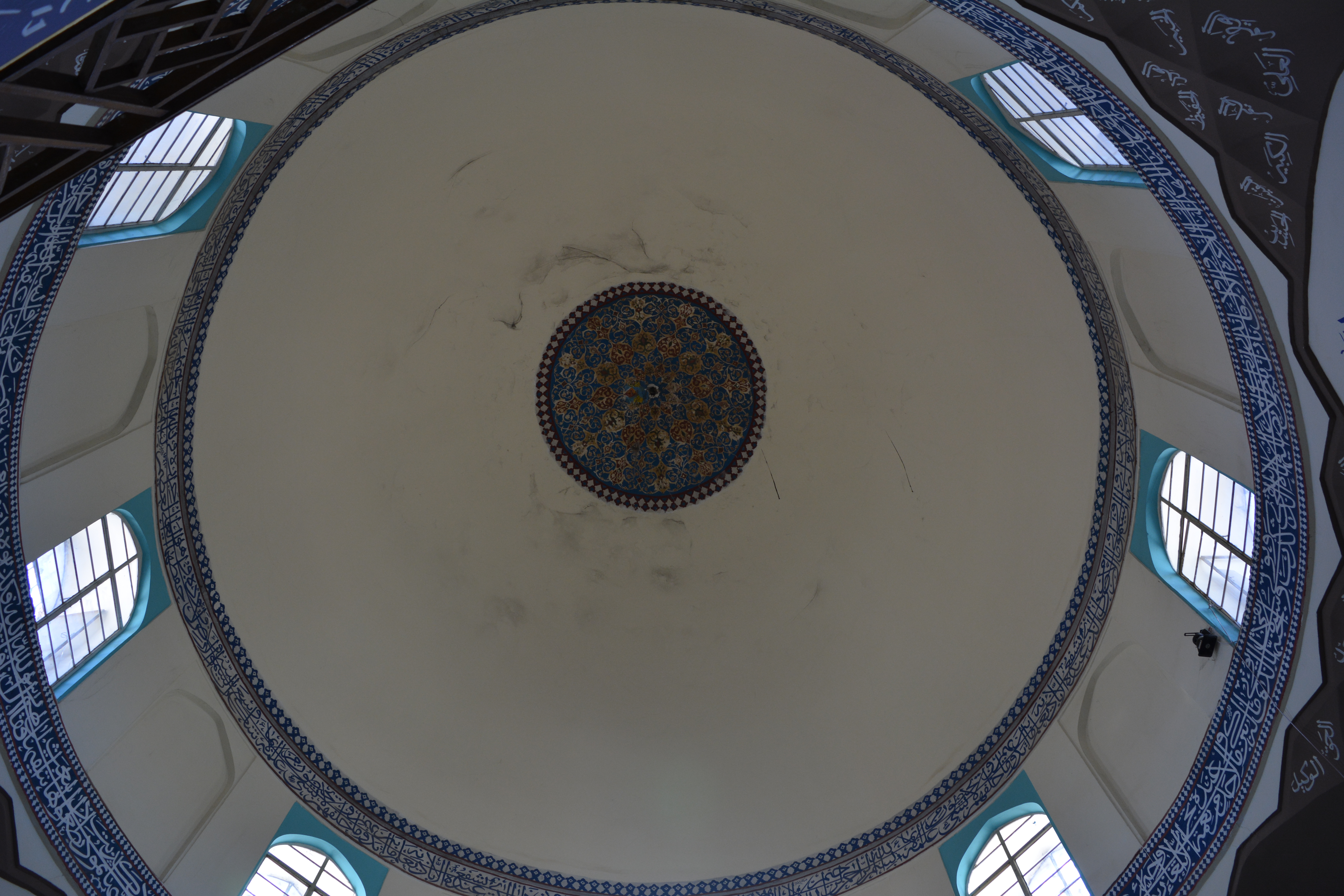
View of the main dome of the Haydar-Khana Mosque from the inside

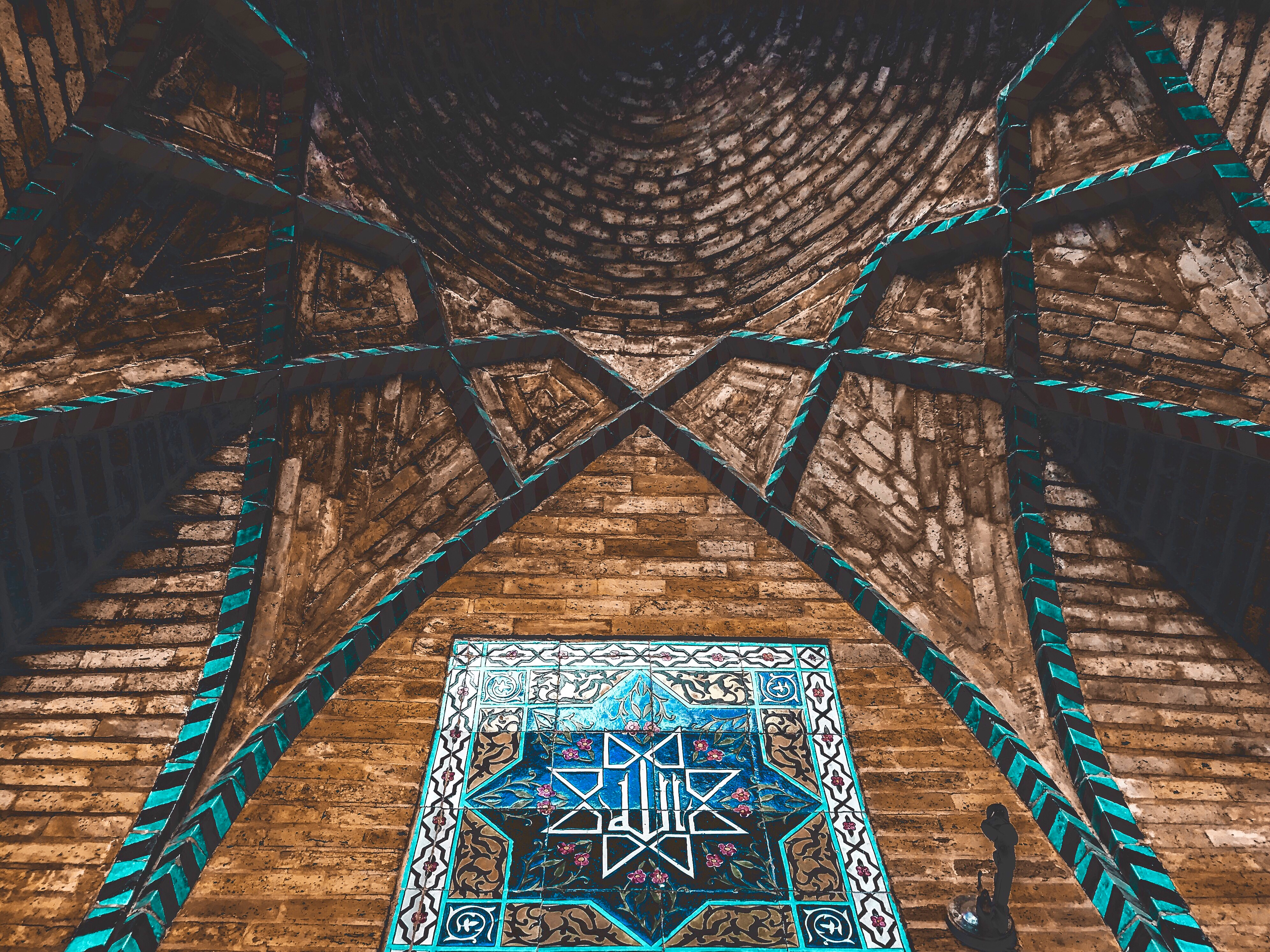
Decorations of the iwans of the Haydar-Khana Mosque

== In fiction ==
The comic book The Sandman features a story (issue 50, "Ramadan") taking place in Baghdad in which a similar looking mosque can be seen on the seventh page.

The mosque is present in several Arabic novels such as The Traveler and the Innkeeper and Papa Sartre.

== See also ==
- Iraqi art
- Shia Islam in Iraq
- List of mosques in Baghdad
