= War in 140 Characters =

2017 book by David Patrikarakos

War in 140 Characters: How Social Media Is Reshaping Conflict in the Twenty-First Century
- Author: David Patrikarakos
- Language: English
- Subject: Propaganda
- Publisher: Basic Books
- Publication date: 2017
- Publication place: United States
- Media type: Print
- Pages: 320
- ISBN: 978-0-46-509614-5 (Hardcover)

War in 140 Characters: How Social Media Is Reshaping Conflict in the Twenty-First Century is a 2017 non-fiction book by British journalist David Patrikarakos, in which he draws from his experiences with forces in the Russia–Ukraine conflict as well as analyses the 2014 Hamas–Israel War, Operation Protective Edge and ISIS, to describe the increasing role played by social media in modern conflict. The book has been optioned for a screen adaptation by Oscar-nominated film producer Angus Wall.

Patrikarakos identifies "a new breed of ‘warriors’ in twenty-first-century conflict – the powerful, globally connected individuals" which he terms "homo digitalis". They include the investigative journalist Eliot Higgins of Bellingcat, who is discussed in two chapters of the book.

== Reviews ==
Patrikarakos' book was widely reviewed in the international press, including by Ben Judah in The Times, who wrote that "War in 140 Characters should be mandatory reading at Sandhurst." In the military sphere, War in 140 Characters was placed on reading lists for the largest security conference in the world, the Munich Security Conference, as well as for the UK's Royal Air Force Centre for Air Power Studies, and singled out as essential reading by Admiral Foggo at an October 2018 meeting of the Atlantic Council. In January 2018, the incoming UK Chief of the Defence Staff, Nick Carter, concluded his first major policy speech at the Royal United Services Institute by calling on the 77 Brigade to observe the lessons of Patrikarakos' book.
