= Nuclear Iran: Birth of an Atomic State =

Observation of Iran nuclear programs by David Patrikarakos

- Author: David Patrikarakos
- Publisher: I.B. Tauris
- Publication date: 2012

Nuclear Iran: Birth of an Atomic State is a 2012 book by the writer David Patrikarakos. The book documented Iran's growing nuclear capabilities, the increasing global tensions surrounding them, and US and Israeli suspicions that they could be a guise for the development of a new nuclear weapons programme.

Nuclear Iran was named as a New York Times Editor's Choice and nominated for the 2013 Total Politics Book Awards. Bill Keller, writing in The New York Times described it as "a cleareyed history of the Iranian nuclear program, enriched by access to a number of key participants and a wealth of scholarly empathy."

The book was welcomed for its "long-term perspective" by Paul Rogers who noted that "the era of the Shah is key, especially after the huge hike in oil prices in 1973-4". It was further termed "minutely researched, deeply immersive, and written with flair" by Tablet magazine.
