= Middle Eastern Studies (journal) =

- Discipline: Middle-Eastern studies
- Language: English
- Edited by: Saul Kelly, Helen Kedourie

Publication details
- History: 1964–present
- Publisher: Taylor & Francis
- Frequency: Bimonthly
- Impact factor: 0.443 (2016)

Standard abbreviations
- ISO 4: Middle East. Stud.

Indexing
- ISSN: 0026-3206 (print); 1743-7881 (web)
- LCCN: 65009869
- OCLC no.: 875122033

Links
- Journal homepage; Online access; Online archive

Middle Eastern Studies is a bimonthly peer-reviewed academic journal of Middle-Eastern studies. It was established in 1964 by Elie Kedourie, who served as editor-in-chief from 1964 to 1992, and is published by Taylor & Francis. From 1992 to 2016, the journal was edited by Sylvia Kedourie. It is now co-edited by Saul Kelly and Helen Kedourie.

== Abstracting and indexing ==
The journal is abstracted and indexed in:

- Academic Search Premier
- CSA databases
- Current Contents/Social & Behavioral Sciences
- EBSCO databases
- GEOBASE
- International Bibliography of Periodical Literature
- Index Islamicus
- International Bibliography of the Social Sciences
- International Political Science Abstracts
- Linguistic Bibliography
- Modern Language Association Database
- ProQuest databases
- Scopus
- Social Sciences Citation Index

According to the Journal Citation Reports, the journal has a 2016 impact factor of 0.443.
