= The Tobacco Keeper =

2008 novel by Ali Bader

The Tobacco Keeper is an Arabic novel by Iraqi writer, Ali Bader, published in Arabic in 2008 and listed for the Arabic Booker prize in 2009. It is set in Damascus, Tehran, Baghdad and beyond. It addresses universal questions of artistic production, dispossession, and identity. The book was translated into English and published by Bloomsbury Qatar Foundation.
