= Shamash School =

Defunct Jewish high school in Baghdad

Location
- Baghdad; Iraq; 33.3201°N 44.4205°E

Information
- Type: High school
- Religious affiliation: Judaism
- Established: 1928
- Closed: 1951
- Principal: Maurice Plotnick
- Enrollment: 900 (peak enrollment in 1939)
- Campus type: Urban
- Affiliation: Anglo-Jewish Association

Shamash School was an Iraqi Jewish high school located on al-Rashid Street, Baghdad, founded in 1928. The school was supported by the Anglo-Jewish Association and had more than 900 students at its peak in 1939. After the expulsion of Jews from Iraq in 1950, the school came under the administration of the Directorate of Frozen Assets and was transformed into an Iranian Iraqi school under the name "Iranian Primary and Secondary School." Later, it became a government school named "Al-Risala School." For some time, the site has been turned into a car garage. In October 2026, the site of the school was opened as a Jewish Heritage Museum.

== History ==
=== Establishment ===
Shamash School was founded in 1928 in the Jadid Hassan Pasha area on al-Rashid Street by the Iraqi Jewish philanthropist Yaqub Shlomo Shamash, with his brother Yusuf Shlomo Shamash serving as its headmaster.

In addition to founding the school, Shamash purchased 17 shops, a pharmacy, and a hotel in the same area, designating them as part of an Iraqi Jewish endowment. The revenues from these properties were allocated to support the school and other community initiatives.

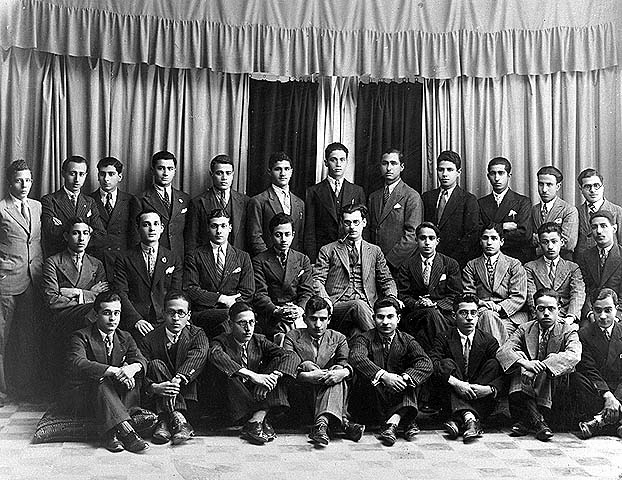
Students of Shamash School with their English teacher in the 1930s

Shamash took over the building in 1928 on the condition that Torah and religious studies would be included in the curriculum. English-language studies were also emphasized, as students were required to pass the Matriculation Exam to graduate. The school included elementary, middle, and high school levels.

Due to its strong English curriculum, Shamash School attracted Jewish students interested in English culture. Graduates received an English-language proficiency certificate, which allowed them to enter British universities without taking an additional language exam. The school also offered special courses for non-students preparing for the Matriculation Exam, which was required for admission to English-speaking universities. 90% of these students were Jewish, according to historical records.

=== 1938–1948 ===
In the first ten years after its establishment, Shamash School expanded into a full-fledged secondary school, offering middle and high school education. The elementary level was discontinued in 1941.

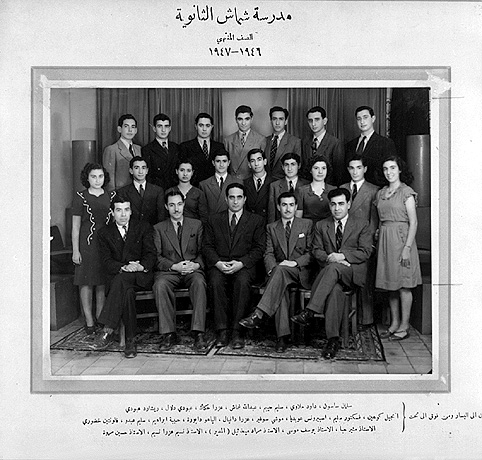
The graduating class of Shamash School in 1947

In 1944–1945, the school opened evening classes for commercial sciences, bookkeeping, and communications. English-language courses were also introduced in the commercial branch, making it the first formal business studies program in Iraq. However, the department was closed in 1947 after the establishment of the College of Commerce and Economics.

In 1949, the middle school section was transferred to the Frank Iny Jewish School, while the high school merged with the private secondary section, becoming a high school exclusively until its closure.

=== 1950–present ===
After the expulsion of Iraqi Jews and the revocation of their citizenship in 1950, the school came under the control of the Directorate of Frozen Assets. It was later transferred to the Iranian community in Iraq and renamed Sharaft Iranian Primary and Secondary School (دبستان ودبيرستان شرافت إيرانيان). Eventually, it became a government school called Al-Risala School. Shamash School had been turned into a parking lot, with most of its interior structure demolished.

The British headmaster, Maurice Plotnick, later emigrated to the United States, where he founded the Westchester Day School.

== Teachers ==
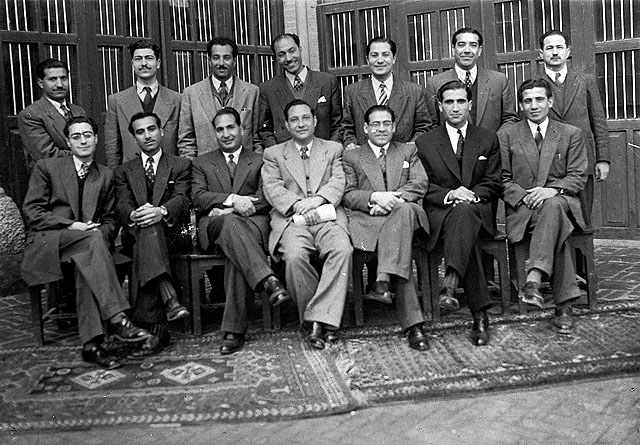
Teachers at Shamash School before they came to Israel in 1950

The teachers were from England and other countries, with the school administration relying on the British Cultural Institute in Baghdad to bring English language teachers directly from the United Kingdom to teach in the fourth and fifth grades.

Later, the Iraqi government intervened and ordered the expulsion of foreign teachers, replacing them with Iraqi Muslim teachers. This was due to the Ministry of Education beginning to feel the presence of Zionism within the school.

== Building ==
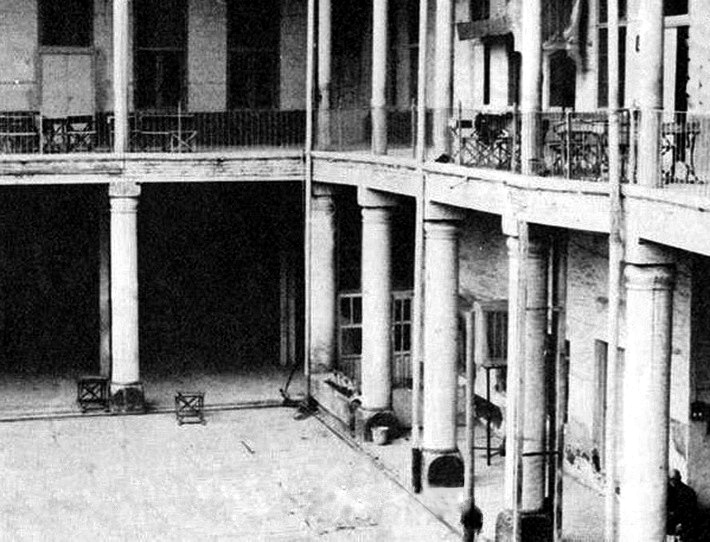
Interior of the Shamash School in 1950

The school was adjacent to the Sabah al-Khayr hotel and on the other side, it was next to Hassan Ajami Café, facing the Haydar-Khana Mosque.

The school had large classrooms and rooms surrounded by big windows that allowed natural light and fresh air. There was a synagogue occupying part of the ground floor, and the rooms on the upper floor included a large laboratory fully equipped for chemistry experiments. Additionally, there was a large theater for plays and a special lounge for the female students in the fourth and fifth grades.

== Jewish Heritage Museum ==
In October 2026, the building was reopened, having been repurposed by the Iraqi government as a Jewish Heritage Museum. The Museum, funded by expatriate Jews of Iraqi descent, provides archival materials, artifacts, photographs and recorded interviews highlighting the history of a community that had accounted for 25% of Baghdad's population and reached 90,000 across Iraq early in the 20th century but had dwindled in the wake of the 1941 Farhud and rising antisemitism, with as few as a half dozen Jews remaining at the time of the museum's opening. There were no Jews among the earliest visitors to the museum, though a visitor who had visited twice and brought his family said "I hope those in charge will think about bringing the Jews back.... I wish they would come and take part in the revival of the country".

== Notable alumni ==
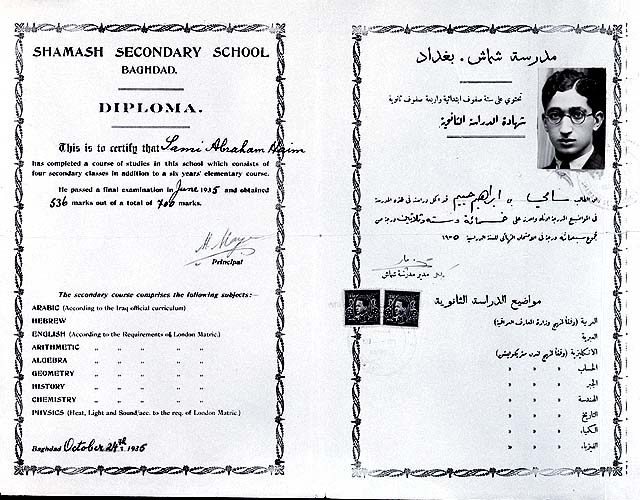
Diploma of a graduate from Shamash School

Shamash School produced prominent figures in various fields including business, administration, and science, from different religious backgrounds, such as Muslims, Christians, and Jews, including:

- Elie Kedourie (1926–1992), historian of the Middle East
- Sylvia Kedourie (1925–2016), historian of the Middle East
- Sami Michael (1926–2024, class of 1945), Iraqi-Israeli author
- Shmuel Moreh (1932–2017), university professor at the Hebrew University of Jerusalem
- Sasson Somekh (1933–2019), Iraqi-Israeli academic, writer and translator
- Raymond Moray, university professor
