= Elie Kedourie =

British historian (1926–1992)

Elie Kedourie CBE FBA
- Born: 25 January 1926; Baghdad, Mandatory Iraq
- Died: 29 June 1992 (aged 66); Washington, D.C., US
- Education: London School of Economics; St Antony's College, Oxford
- Occupation: Historian
- Spouse: Sylvia Kedourie (m. 1950)
- Children: 3

Elie Kedourie CBE FBA (25 January 1926 – 29 June 1992) was a British-Iraqi historian of the Middle East. He wrote from a perspective that dissented from many points of view taken as orthodox in the field. From 1953 to 1990, he taught at the London School of Economics, where he became Professor of Politics. Kedourie was famous for his rejection of what he called the "Chatham House version" of history, which viewed the story of the modern Middle East as one of continuous victimisation at the hands of the West, and instead castigated left-wing Western intellectuals for what he regarded as a naively romantic view of Islam.

== Early life ==
Kedourie was born on 25 January 1926 in Baghdad, Mandatory Iraq to an Iraqi-Jewish family and grew up in the Jewish quarter of Baghdad. Kedourie was educated at the Collège A.D. Sassoon (Note: Named after Albert Sassoon.) run by the Alliance Israélite Universelle. Kedourie later attended Shamash School, where he met his future wife the historian Sylvia Kedourie.

Kedourie studied at the London School of Economics, where he received his undergraduate degree, and at St Antony's College, Oxford, where he worked towards a DPhil.

== Scholarship and controversy ==
=== Doctoral thesis ===
Kedourie's doctoral thesis (afterwards published as England and the Middle East) was critical of Britain's interwar role in Iraq. It was refused a University of Oxford DPhil, but was published in 1956. It castigated British policy makers for their encouragement of Arab nationalism and contained a very negative view of T. E. Lawrence. Kedourie attacked British policy-makers for first creating in 1921 the Kingdom of Iraq out of the former Ottoman vilayets (provinces) of Mosul, Baghdad, and Basra and then imposing "a militantly Arab nationalist regime upon a diverse society". Kedourie refused to make the changes requested by one of the examiners, Sir Hamilton Alexander Rosskeen Gibb, and did not get the degree. Given the prestige of a DPhil at Oxford, Kedourie, in the words of the American historian Martin Kramer, displayed "much courage" in refusing to change his thesis.

Kedourie's personal history helps to explain his viewpoint. Starting with the very first Iraqi ruler, King Faisal I and continuing on to the present, Iraqiness was and still is defined as being Islamic Arab; and, as an Iraqi Jew, Kedourie simply did not fit into the society that was being created in Iraq in the 1920s, 1930s and the 1940s. Iraq once had a large and flourishing Jewish community that predates the Arab conquest of the seventh century, but whose existence ended in the 20th century as a result of the rise of Arab-Islamic centered nationalist movements; most Iraqi Jews fled to Israel to escape persecution in Iraq. For Kedourie, the idea that someone like Lawrence was a romantic hero was absurd as Kedourie saw him instead as an irresponsible adventurer who, by encouraging Arab nationalism, had created a new state, Iraq, that people like him did not belong in. In his view, it was no accident that, within less than a year after the granting of independence in October 1932, one of the first acts of the Iraqi state was the "Assyrian Affair" of August 1933, when the state sponsored the slaughter of the Assyrian minority, establishing from the start its intolerant and violent character. Far from an "awakening", Kedourie saw the rise of nationalism in the Middle East as a retrogression to the region's worst autocratic tendencies. As someone from the Middle East, Kedourie accused many Western Orientalists of having an idealised view of the Arab world, arguing that Western civilisation was not as rotten as the Orientalists would have it, nor was the Middle East the virtuous and innocent victim of Western imperialism that historians like Arnold J. Toynbee sought to present.

=== Subsequent career ===
Michael Oakeshott brought Kedourie back to the LSE in 1953. In 1964, Kedourie was founder and editor of the academic journal, Middle Eastern Studies.

His 1960 book Nationalism provoked replies, in Thought and Change (1964) and Nations and Nationalism (1983), by his LSE colleague Ernest Gellner, who contested Kedourie's theories on the potential eliminability of nationalist thought. Kedourie was critical of Marxist interpretations of history and nationalism. Kedourie claimed that nationalism had turned the Middle East into "a wilderness of tigers". Kedourie also documented and criticised what he saw as the British Empire's debilitation by excessive self-criticism.

In 1970, he attacked another British celebrity, Arnold J. Toynbee, in the essay The Chatham House Version, and held him partly responsible for the British abdication of responsibility for the state of the Middle East. Kedourie attacked Toynbee for his criticism of the British Empire, arguing that contra Toynbee, the British Empire had been a positive institution whose decline had brought disaster to its former colonies, most notably in the Middle East. Kedourie argued that multi-national empires like the British Empire, the Ottoman Empire and the Austrian Empire had allowed different peoples to live together in peace, and the break-up of empires had led to wars as nationalists fought each other for dominance. For Kedourie, Toynbee's work had denied the "civilizing role" played by the British Empire and white-washed the brutal tendencies of Third World nationalists whom Kedourie argued were far worse than the colonial powers they had replaced, which is why Kedourie attacked the "Chatham House version of history" with such vehemence. Kedourie had no use for nationalism, which he saw as dividing people up, and believed that importing Western ideas of nationalism into the Middle East had been a disaster, as it turned people who once lived together in harmony into enemies as various peoples started to see themselves as part of this or that nation. The Israeli historian Efraim Karsh criticised Kedourie for his thesis that the era of the Ottoman Empire was one of peaceful co-existence of peoples who did not have national identities, citing the Wahhabi raids; the wars of independence in Greece, Serbia, and Bulgaria; the anti-Christian pogroms and massacres in the Levant in 1859–60; and the Hamidian massacres of Armenians, to demonstrate the limits of Kedourie's "peaceful co-existence" thesis.

In his 1976 book, In the Anglo-Arab Labyrinth: The McMahon-Husayn Correspondence and Its Interpretations, 1914–1939, Kedourie disputed what he considered the myth of "the Great Betrayal" that British high commissioner in Egypt, Sir Henry McMahon had promised in 1914–15 the Sharif of Mecca Hussein bin Ali an empire in the Middle East and that the British betrayed the Sharif by signing the Sykes–Picot Agreement with the French in 1916, followed by the Balfour Declaration in 1917. Kedourie argued that British decision-makers in the interwar period, motivated in equal measure by a lack of cultural confidence and a desire to renege on their written promises to the French and Zionists had accepted the Arab nationalist claim that the Sharif Hussein had been promised an empire in the Near East, instead arguing that McMahon had made no such promise and the British claim of "defaulting" on their commitments to the Hashemites were entirely a myth created by British themselves.

In a 1977 column published in the Times Literary Supplement, reviewing the book A Savage War of Peace by Alistair Horne, Kedourie vigorously attacked Horne as an apologist for terrorism, accusing him of engaging the "cosy pieties" of bien-pensants as Kedourie condemned those Western intellectuals who excused terrorism when committed by Third World revolutionaries. Kedourie attacked Horne for claiming that it was the French who were responsible for the fact that most of the Algerian Muslims lived in conditions of dire poverty, though he acknowledged that Horne was correct that the racial barriers between the pied-noir and Muslim communities were a source of tension. Kedourie challenged Horne's account that racism on the part of the French had caused the war, instead arguing that the Algerian National Liberation Front (FLN) were a ruthless and very small group of radical intellectuals organised along Leninist lines who took advantage of French liberal democracy to wage a very brutal terrorist campaign that targeted both the French and any Muslim who was not with them. Kedourie argued that the fact Algeria had been a one-party dictatorship under the FLN since independence in 1962 was the "natural" result of the totalitarian mindset of the FLN. Kedourie stated that by 1958 the French were clearly winning the war and by 1959 had broken the back of the FLN. Kedourie argued that Charles de Gaulle was the "master of the situation" by 1960 and could have ensured that the Algerian Muslims would have equal rights with the pieds-noirs, but instead blinded by other ideas of French greatness chose to grant Algeria independence." Kedourie charged that de Gaulle had cynically sacrificed the colons and the harkis and that de Gaulle had chosen to disregard his constitutional oath as president to protect all the French to ensure that "the French withdrew and handed over power to the only organized body of armed men who were on the scene – a civilized government thus acting for all the world like the votary of some Mao or Ho, in the barbarous belief that legitimacy comes from the power of the gun". Kedourie's review sparked much debate at the time, and marked the beginning of a historical debate about the legitimacy of terrorism to achieve political goals that continues to the present day. For Kedourie, the FLN's use of terrorism negated whatever claim to moral legitimacy they claimed to have had.

In 1992, in "The Wretched of Algeria", a review of the book Historie de l'Algérie by the French historian Charles-Robert Ageron, Kedourie condemned Ageron for being sympathetic to the FLN. He again denounced de Gaulle for granting Algeria independence, writing that the Algerians "were cruelly abandoned to the mercies of the FLN, a handful of purs et durs, spurred on by nationalism, that curse of the modern world to seize power and rule for their own benefit. Their Arabizing policies, however, had opened up the country to the influence of fundamentalist movements like the Muslim Brotherhood in the Middle East, so that Islam came to provide the growing opposition with not only a political idiom, but also a revolutionary cause stigmatized by the same conspiratorial violence once shown by the FLN. Caught between the monsters of the FLN and those of the FIS or Islamic Salvation Front, the Algerian people are sure to pay the price".

== Personal life ==
On 3 August 1950, Kedourie married Sylvia Kedourie at Bevis Marks Synagogue. The couple had two sons and one daughter.

On 29 June 1992 Kedourie died in Washington, D.C., aged 66.

== Books ==
- England and the Middle East: The Vital Years 1914–1921 (1956); later as England and the Middle East: the destruction of the Ottoman Empire 1914–1921
- Nationalism (1960); revised edition 1993
- Afghani and 'Abduh: An essay on religious unbelief and political activism in modern Islam (1966)
- The Chatham House Version: And Other Middle Eastern Studies (1970)
- Nationalism in Asia and Africa (1970) editor
- Arabic Political Memoirs and Other Studies (1974)
- In the Anglo-Arab Labyrinth: The McMahon-Husayn Correspondence and its Interpretations 1914–1939 (1976)
- Middle Eastern Economy: Studies in Economics and Economic History (1976)
- The Jewish World: Revelation, Prophecy and History (1979) editor; as The Jewish World: History and Culture of the Jewish World (US)
- Islam in the Modern World and Other Studies (1980)
- Towards a Modern Iran; Studies in Thought, Politics and Society (1980) editor with Sylvia G. Haim
- Modern Egypt: Studies in Politics and Society (1980) editor
- Zionism and Arabism in Palestine and Israel (1982) editor with Sylvia G. Haim
- The Crossman Confessions and Other Essays in Politics, History and Religion (1984)
- Diamonds into Glass: The Government and the Universities (1988)
- Essays on the Economic History of the Middle East (1988) editor with Sylvia G. Haim
- Democracy and Arab Political Culture (1992)
- Politics in the Middle East (1992)
- Spain and the Jews: The Sephardi Experience, 1492 and after (1992)
- Hegel & Marx: Introductory Lectures (1995)
