= Ali Bader =

Iraqi Belgian writer

- علي بدر
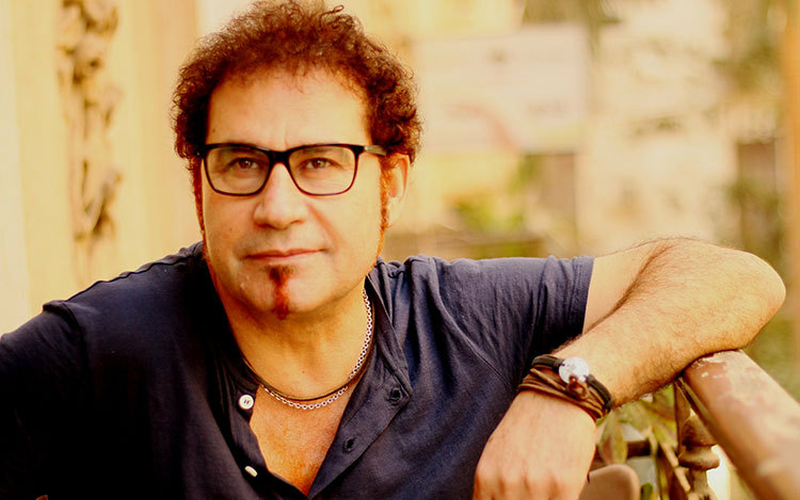
- Born: 1979 (age 46–47); Baghdad, Ba'athist Iraq
- Education: Literature
- Occupations: Novelist, poet, journalist

Ali Bader (Arabic علي بدر) is an Iraqi-Belgian novelist and script writer. He is the author of 18 novels and the editor-in-chief of Arabic publishing house Alca Books. His best-known works include Papa Sartre, The Tobacco Keeper, The Running after the Wolves, and The Sinful Woman. He lives in Brussels.

== Biography ==
Bader was born in Baghdad, Iraq, in 1979. He studied Western Philosophy and French Literature at Baghdad University.

In 2001, he published his best-known novel, Papa Sartre, a parody of the trials and tribulations of the intellectuals of 1960s Baghdad, which portrays Iraq's wealthy and influential families in their decline. For this work, he was awarded the State Prize for Literature in Baghdad in 2002, as well as the Tunisian Abu Al-Qassem Al-Shabi Award. Following critical acclaim in the Arab world, it was translated into English.

His 2002 novel The Family's Winter (Arabic: شتاء العائلة) revisited the decline of Iraq's elite, this time focusing on the aristocracy in the 1950s. That same year, he received the Prize of Literary Creativity in the United Arab Emirates. His 2003 novel The Road to Mutran Hill dealt with Iraqi social problems and increasing social divisions, anticipating the further disintegration of Iraq's socioeconomic fabric.

In 2004, he followed up with The Naked Feast (Arabic: الوليمة العارية), exploring the emergence of the Iraqi intelligentsia at the beginning of the 20th century. Bader's novel Tumult, Women, and a Sunken Writer (2005) depicts the marginalized generation of Iraqi poets and novelists in the 1990s under Saddam Hussein's dictatorship and the international sanctions. One of his published essays, "Mid-night Maps", set during a journey to Iran, Turkey and Algeria, won the Ibn Battuta Prize for Contemporary Journeys. His 2006 novel Jerusalem Lantern is a fictional portrayal of Edward Said.

His 2007 novel Running after the Wolves highlights the Iraqi intellectuals who fled to Africa because of persecution under Saddam Hussein's regime. His novel The Tobacco Keeper examines cultural life after the tumultuous events of 2003. At the center of the novel is the life of an Iraqi Jewish musician killed in Baghdad in 2006, and his struggle to integrate into Iraqi society as an artist. The novel was nominated for the Arab Booker Prize.

In 2009, he published Kings of the Sand, about the conflict between the Iraqi army and the inhabitants of the desert. In 2010, he published Crime, Art, and Dictionary of Baghdad, a novel about the philosophical schools of the Abbathe Sid era.

Bader has also written non-fiction books, including Massignion in Baghdad (2005), Sleeping Prince and Waiting Campaign (2006), and Shahadat: Witnessing Iraq's Transformation after 2003 (2007). His novel MNSG: Navigation between Home and Exile (2008) won the Every Human Has Rights Media Award in 2008.

Bader is also a columnist in several Arabic newspapers, including Al-Hayat, Al Mada, Al-Dustour, and Al Riyadh. His journalism career has included assignments as a war correspondent.

== Bibliography ==
=== Novels ===
- Papa Sartre (2001) Translated into English ISBN 978-977-416-298-5
- Family's Winter (2002)
- The Naked Feast (2003)
- The Road to Bishop's Hill (2004)
- Beautiful Woman and Obscured Writer (2005)
- Jerusalem Lantern, novel about Edward Saed (2006)
- Running After the Wolves (2007)
- The Tobacco Keeper (2008) (Long list Arab Booker Prize) Translated into English, Bloomsbury, 2011
- The Kings Sands (2009)(Long list Arab Booker Prize)
- Crime, Art, and Baghdad Dictionary (2010)
- The Professors of Illusion (2011)
- The Sinful Woman (2015)
- Liars Get Every Things (2017)
- The Killers' Party - (collection of short Stories) (2018)
- The Exile's Strange Journal. (2019)
- Last Words of a Filipina Sex Worker in Dubai (2020)
- The Invited to the Lady’s Evening (2022)
- Musician in the Clouds (2023) Translated into English ISBN 978-1647124434
- Our Colonel Trilogy, Maps and Weapons. Part One (2024)
- Our man in Nisapour (2025)

=== English anthology of fiction ===
- Baghdad Noir, Akashic books 2018 ISBN 9781617753435
- Iraq+100, Comma press, One of NPR's Best Books of 2017! ISBN 1905583664

=== Poetry ===
- Book of the Trade: Baghdad in 1898, ethnographic poems (2000)
- Crimes of velvet and cream (2002)
- Book of assassins (2004)
- Book of the desert (2005)
- Book of erotic man (2009)
- Book of the happy exiled (2012)

=== Essays ===
- The cold heart of the moon (2023)
- An invitation card to celebrities party (2010)
- Mid-night Maps (2006)
- Massignion in Baghdad (2005)
- Sleeping prince and waiting campaign (2005)
- Shahadat: witnessing Iraq's transformation after 2003

== Theater ==
- 2004 The world of non married women
- 2009 The tavern of immigrants
- 2013 Fatima whose name is Sophie.

=== Films ===
- Under the Ashes with Ziad T. Jazzaa
- The Story of Iraqi literature

== Awards and grants ==
- Mario Lattes Prize, shortlist for the novel Plying with the Clouds, Italian edition, published by Argo. (Roma 2019)
- Sheikh Hamad Award for Translation and International Understanding for the French translation of Papa Sartre's novel, published by Edition du Seuil. (2016 Doha)
- Saint Eden-Banipal Scholarship at the University of Durham in Britain. (2014 UK)
- Scholarship at the House of chines writers in Shanghai. (2013 Shanghai)
- Heinrich Boll scholarship in Germany. (2010 Cologne)
- Longlisted for Arab Booker Prize, the novel Kings of the Sands. (2009)
- The Every Human Has Rights Award, the international award for journalistic reporting, for the book Navigating the Space Between Home and Exile. (2008, Paris)
- Longlisted, the Arab Booker Prize for the novel The Tobacco Keeper. (2008)
- Medal of Honor from the Algerian National Library for writing about literature and exile.(2007)
- Ibn Battuta Prize for Traveling Books (Abu Dhabi 2005)
- Prize of Literary Creativity (U E A 2004)
- Abu al-Qassim Al-Shabi Prize for PAPA SARTRE(Tunis 2003)
- State Prize of literature for PAPA SARTRE (Baghdad 2002)
