= Sylvia Kedourie =

British historian (1925–2016)

- סילביה כדורי
- Kedourie at the Spanish and Portuguese Synagogue of Montreal; 2014
- Born: Sylvia G. Haim סילביה ג. חיים; 19 December 1925; Baghdad, Mandatory Iraq
- Died: 24 October 2016 (aged 90); London, UK
- Education: University of Edinburgh
- Occupations: Historian; editor
- Spouse: Elie Kedourie (m. 1950; died 1992)
- Children: 3

Sylvia Kedourie (née Haim; Hebrew: סילביה כדורי; Arabic: سيلفيا كيدورى; 19 December 1925 – 24 October 2016), known professionally as Sylvia G. Haim, was a British-Iraqi historian of the Middle East and editor.

== Early life and education ==
Sylvia G. Haim (Hebrew: סילביה ג. חיים) was born in Baghdad, Mandatory Iraq on 19 December 1925 to Gourgi Abraham Haim and Seraphine Somekh-Basra. A member of the Iraqi–Jewish community, Kedourie attended a French-language Jewish girls school run by the Alliance Israélite Universelle. Kedourie later attended Shamash college, where she met her future husband the historian Elie Kedourie.

In 1947, Kedourie settled in Edinburgh to study for a Master's in philosophy at the University of Edinburgh. Kedourie later studied at the School of Oriental and African Studies, before completing her PhD at University of Edinburgh in 1953. Her doctoral work studying the intellectual legacy of Abd al-Rahman al-Kawakibi, led to the publication "Arab Nationalism, An Anthology" in 1962.

== Career ==
In 1964, Kedourie and her husband founded the Middle Eastern Studies journal. From 1964 to 1992, Kedourie worked as a editor for the journal whilst Elie Kedourie served as the editor-in-chief. Following her husband's death in 1992, Kedourie served as the journals editor-in-chief until her own death in 2016.

== Personal life ==
On 3 August 1950, Kedourie married Elie Kedourie at Bevis Marks Synagogue. The couple had two sons and one daughter.

On 24 October 2016 Kedourie died in London, aged 90.

== Publications ==
- Haim, Sylvia G., ed. (1962). Arab Nationalism, An Anthology. Berkley; Los Angeles: University of California Press.
- Arnold, Thomas Walker; Haim, Sylvia G. (1965). The Caliphate ... With a Concluding Chapter by Sylvia G. Haim. London: Routledge & Kegan Paul.
- Kedourie, Elie; Haim, Sylvia G., eds. (1980). Towards a Modern Iran: Studies in Thought, Politics, and Society. London: Frank Cass & Co. ISBN 0714631450.
- Kedourie, Elie; Haim, Sylvia G., eds. (1980). Modern Egypt: Studies in Politics and Society. London: Frank Cass & Co. ISBN 071463168X.
- Kedourie, Elie; Haim, Sylvia G., eds. (1982). Zionism and Arabism in Palestine and Israel. London: Frank Cass & Co. ISBN 0714631698.
- Kedourie, Elie; Haim, Sylvia G., eds. (1982). Palestine and Israel in the 19th and 20th Centuries. London: Frank Cass & Co. ISBN 0714631213.
- Kedourie, Elie; Haim, Sylvia G., eds. (1988). Essays on the Economic History of the Middle East. London: Frank Cass & Co. ISBN 0714633186.
- Kedourie, Elie; Haim, Sylvia G.; Kedourie, Helen, eds. (1995). Hegel and Marx: Introductory Lectures. Oxford: Blackwell. ISBN 0631193227.
- Kedourie, Sylvia, ed. (1996). Turkey: Identity, Democracy, Politics. London: Frank Cass & Co. ISBN 0714647187.
- Kedourie, Sylvia, ed. (1998). Elie Kedourie, CBE, FBA 1926-1992: History, Philosophy, Politics. London: Frank Cass & Co. ISBN 9780714644196.
- Kedourie, Sylvia, ed. (2000). Seventy-five Years of the Turkish Republic. London: Frank Cass & Co. ISBN 0714650420.
- Kedourie, Sylvia, ed. (2006). Elie Kedourie's Approaches to History and Political Theory: 'The Thoughts and Actions of Living Men'. London: Routledge & Kegan Paul. ISBN 9780415396752.
