= Papa Sartre =

Novel by Ali Bader

- Author: Ali Bader
- Publication date: 2001
- Publication place: Beirut

Papa Sartre is an Arabic novel by Iraqi writer Ali Bader, it was originally published in Arabic in Beirut, 2001, and met warmly by cultural critics and intellectuals in the Arab world. An English translation was published in 2009, by American University in Cairo Press, and won Ali Bader several literary prizes.

== Plot summary ==
The novel opens with two charlatans commissioning a biographical novel. A starving academic is hired to write the life story of Abdel Rahman, an Existential philosopher who died in the late 1960s and was acclaimed as the "Sartre of Baghdad." Father Hanna and his sexy consort, Nunu Bihar, are pragmatic and clear from the very beginning: philosophy is a business, and the narrator's assignment is to create a larger-than-life Iraqi equivalent of the original French philosopher Jean-Paul Sartre. The would-be narrator is introduced to a third party - the project's funder, Sadeq Zadeh - whose remit is to approve the written version of the philosopher's death. He is then handed dossiers of documents, photographs, diaries, and letters and assigned a dubious research assistant, who looks more like a pickpocket, to accompany him on interviews with the few remaining friends of the late philosopher.

The charlatans demonstrate an amorality that fascinates the narrator, with their wide latitude for unconstrained heckling, irreverence, and recklessness along with factual discrepancies - not to mention the scandalously seductive nature of Nunu Bihar's overt sexuality. A biography can depict a life with all its flaws, weaknesses, and baseness, thinks the narrator. This proves difficult for him at first, with collective memory being subject to strict cultural variables. He finds there were those who admired all the dead: servants overlooked and forgave mistakes, hesitated at admitting domestic scandals, attributing superhuman qualities in hagiographic proportions to those no longer living.

The philosopher's friends, on the other hand, told another story, accurate but equally flawed. Glossing over a sense of shame, they assigned to themselves important roles, describing 1960s Baghdad as a lost paradise that had expelled its most prominent philosopher with no recognition. Documents prove similarly discouraging for the narrator: "All spoke a single character, a unique and towering figure, one that summarized for an entire society a tragic world and symbolized for an entire nation tragic anomie." Overriding these methodological obstacles, the narrator eventually succeeds in producing a candid account of the life of Abdel Rahman, the Existentialist of al-Sadriyah.

One day, as on many other days, the Sartre of Baghdad woke up feeling nauseous. He picked up a gilt-framed photograph of Sartre and admired the physical resemblance between them. But adoration turned to feelings of inadequacy. He glanced at the philosopher's bad eye. "Abdel Rahman had immense faith in the philosophical bad eye, he understood its value and greatness while appreciating how difficult a condition it was attain. It was the defect of the impossible, a metaphysical defect like that of god. He experienced despair…as if something was missing in his existence…(a shortcoming) remained a heavy load on his heart, a cruel destructive feeling that he felt when he was in Paris.

The reality of Abdul Rahman Sartre student days in Paris was dismal. His linguistic proficiency was such that he was unable to approach, let alone conducts a conversation with, the giant of existentialism. Incapable of learning French, he never completed his degree, his rapturous audience back in Baghdad would lovingly support Abdul Rahman, "was Sartre a philosopher because of his degree or because of his philosophy?" True. He assumed the role of witness, the man who had seen Sartre and had arrived from Paris to tell them all about him. Unable to write in either French or Arabic and incapable of concentrating for long hours or of thinking with any systematic logic, he owned the complete works of Sartre from which he would read a few lines and swoon into day-dreaming. Our philosopher despised writing as an act of estrangement; it resembled masturbation in that it was an act of identification with words –images of nothingness-and not with nothingness itself. Speech, on the other hand represented the moment, the emotion-it was as cathartic as it was euphoric. Oral discourse was integral to the culture of the coffee house of the early 1960s in Baghdad. Most of the intellectuals of his generation pontificated endlessly over dominoes in the morning and regrouped in the local bars at night. Their knowledge of philosophy was limited to books titles and short summaries found in newspapers and literary magazines. Existentialism legitimized a way of life. "There was no reality, no reality to be understood". Abdel Rahman Sartre's identity was locked into that world. His aristocratic background shielded his self-image; he never saw the need to work for a living, always believing that he was a speaker not a writer, a philosopher not charlatan. One of the outstanding characters in Papa Sartre is Ismael Hadoub, he first appears selling pornographic photographs in Baghdad in the mid-1950s, his most enthusiastic customer being a rich Jewish merchant, Saul, who owns a store in al Sadriyah and bargains tirelessly over prices. Saul takes on Ismail and transforms him into an obedient and grateful acolyte.

== The end ==
Some of the novel's more remarkable pages describe the young Ismail's unwitting transformation into a master of deceit. He sensed hypocrisy in his dealings with Saul, who represented the paradox of the rich in his Fabian ideals, which nowadays is dubbed as compassionate conservatism. "If Saul had paid so little for his photographs, how could he possibly believe in a commune of happiness and purity? If, as Saul said, wealth belonged legitimately to the poor, then why not hand his shop over to them, or open his residence to the downtrodden and impoverished?"

Ismail's initial conclusions awakened his predatory instinct; he wanted the best of life without having to work for it. One morning Saul walked into the shop and wept over the fate of a hero in a novel he had read the night before. Bewildered, Ismail imitated him, trying to imagine what it would be like to see the world with Saul's eyes. Mime was the best way of turning the tables on his benefactor and becoming a better master to deceit. The moment Abdel Rahman Sartre returned from Paris and set up shop in the coffee houses of Al-Sadriyah, Ismail teamed up with him and became his "de Beauvoir." He affirmed what Saul had known all along: humanity would sacrifice nothing except for monetary gain. Four years later, Ismail began an affair with Abdel Rahman's wife.

Nausea permeated all Abdel Rahman's activities: sex, voraciously eating a tender steak and washing it down with red wine, smoking expensive cigarettes, even looking at a pair of patent leather shoes - all these things made him nauseous. Nausea became permanent and contagious. Dalal Masabni's night club, where he lovingly hung the portrait of his Existentialist idol and had his reserved "philosopher’s table," exuded overemotional nausea. Patting a well-endowed bosom, the dancer of the evening would proclaim the seat of her nausea to be lodged on her "Existential breasts."

Analysing Abdel Rahman's sexual preferences, the narrator applies a somewhat unconvincing Freudian text-book interpretation and traces a genuine nausea back to the time in Abdel Rahman's childhood when he sneaked in on his parents having sex. The exaggerated odour and the moaning of his mother shocked and nauseated him. His whole life was then a violent rejection of what he saw as his mother's pretension to purity.

Filth represented an antidote, a form of purification, a crude and cruel beauty, desolate, uncivilized. In his world of sexual chaos, filth exited him; debauchery was the closest image to himself and symbolized Existential isolation: cheap, enjoyable, illicit, while the deeper loathing for his body was symptomatic of existential sickness.

Abdel Rahman Sartre's wealth allowed him to reinvent his pain, his inadequacies, his persona. With groupies living off the largesse of their philosopher-king, no one contradicted him even in the simplest matters. This, the narrator maintains in sweeping statement, characterized the entire generation of the 1960s. A difference of opinion implied rejection; it annihilated and humiliated the contender which inevitably resulted in an endless round of insults. What eventually shatters the world of Abdel Rahman Sartre, a week before his suicide, is the sensational scandal of the illicit affair between Ismail Haddub and his wife.

The true nature of the business deal to write the philosopher's biography is revealed when the two charlatans, Hanna and Nunu Bihar, attempt to blackmail no other than Ismail Haddub in his new persona as Sadeq Zadeh. After being swindled out of his manuscript and his money, the narrator encounters Nunu Bihar in another guise. Sporting a short hair-cut, a loose white shirt covering her ample breasts and tight men's trousers and shoes, with no make-up, she offers him another deal. And Ismail/Sadeq Zadeh emerges in a third manifestation: totally bald and wearing silver–rimmed glasses, he now styles himself to resemble Foucault, dubbing himself "the Structuralist of al-Waziriyah." The team of impresarios dream now of creating an "Arab Structuralism," in which all men resemble Michel Foucault and all women wear men's trousers with boyish haircuts.

== Publication details ==
- 2009, American University in Cairo press, ISBN 978-977-416-298-5

== Footnotes ==
- IPM/AUC - No Such Title
