= Ibn al-Aquli =

Medieval Islamic scholar and Mustanisiriyya teacher

Ibn al-‘Āqūlī
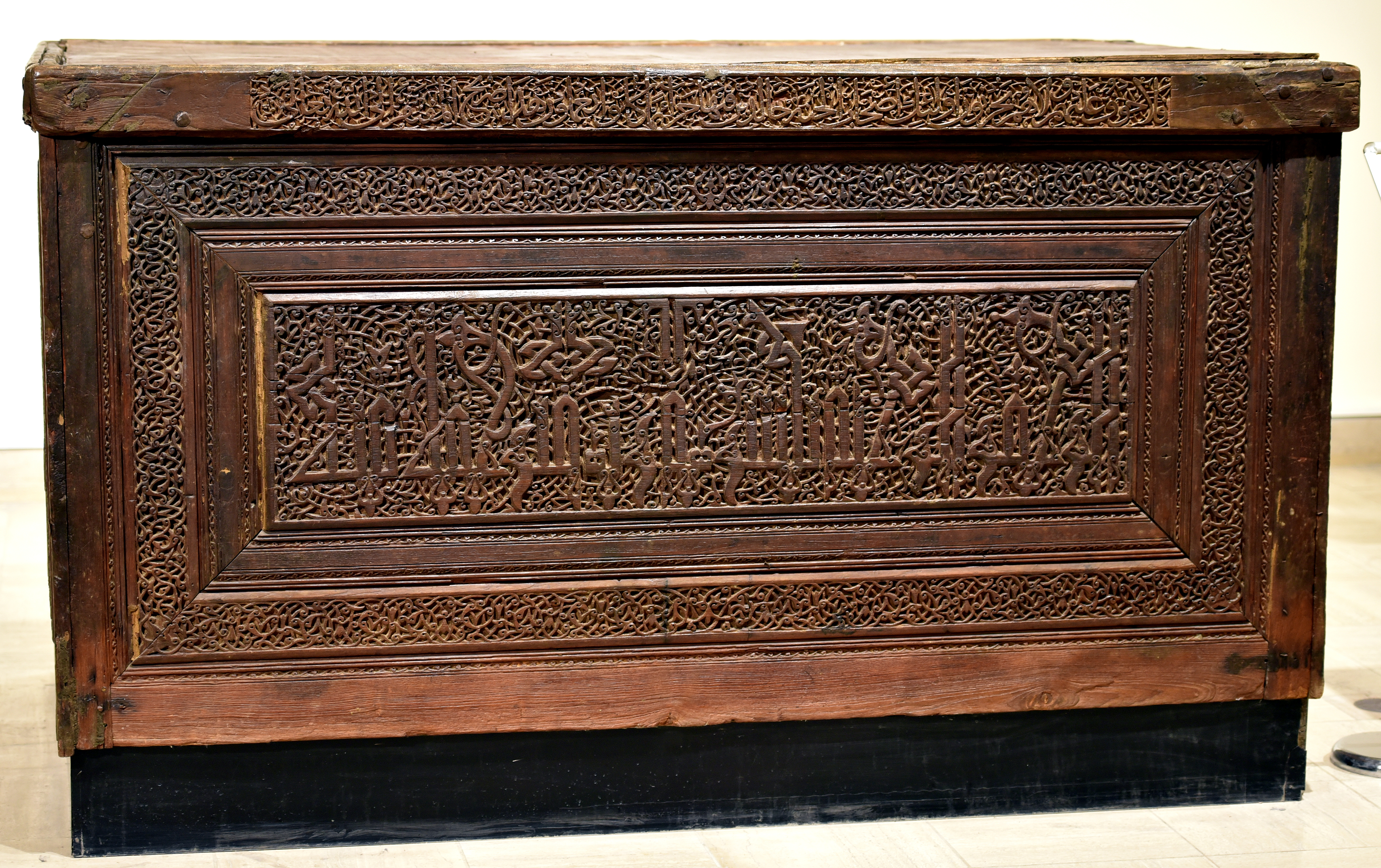
- Wooden cenotaph of Ibn al-Aquli, in the Iraq Museum

Personal life
- Born: Jamāl al-Dīn Muḥammad ibn al-‘Āqūlī; 1240–1241 Baghdad, Abbasid Caliphate
- Died: 1327 Baghdad, Ilkhanate
- Era: Medieval
- Region: Mesopotamia

Religious life
- Religion: Islam
- Denomination: Sunni
- Jurisprudence: Shāfiʿī

Jamāl al-Dīn Muḥammad ibn al-‘Āqūlī (1240/41–1327) also known as Ibn al-‘Āqūlī, was an Islamic scholar and jurist of the Shafi'i school from Baghdad, Iraq. Living during the Ilkhanate, he served as the head mufti and a chief qāḍī of Baghdad, starting during the reign of Abaqa Khan and ending during the early years of the reign of Abu Sa'id.

== Biography ==
Jamal al-Din Muhammad ibn al-Aquli was born in the year 638 of the Islamic calendar, which corresponds to between 1240 and 1241 in Gregorian years. He was a scholar of the Shafi'i school and an alumnus of the Mustansiriyya Madrasa, with an ijazah to teach the topics of jurisprudence and Islamic law. Ibn al-Aquli survived the Mongol invasion of Baghdad in 1258 and was appointed as a scholar of the reformed Islamic court under Mongol suzerainty, although his firstborn son was killed by Mongol troops.

Ibn al-Aquli was first appointed as the qāḍī of Baghdad during the rule of Abaqa Khan in 1265 and later re-appointed as the qāḍī during the rule of Tekuder. He continued to hold this position during the reigns of subsequent Mongol rulers for the rest of his lifetime. He also held the position of mufti and was a senior teacher at the Mustansiriyya Madrasa. His residence in Baghdad in the Al-Rusafa area served as an orphanage and a place for others to practice their Qur'anic recitations.

The historian Ibn al-Fuwaiti held a one-sided rivalry with Ibn al-Aquli and even travelled to the residence of Abu Sa'id in 1318 to make a complaint to the ruler and try to expel Ibn al-Aquli from his position as qāḍī and mufti, although his request was immediately turned down.

Ibn al-Aquli died in 1327 during the reign of Abu Sa'id Bahadur Khan. He was buried behind his residence, which was still in use as an orphanage even after his death. Ibn al-Aquli left behind a second son, Muhammad al-Aquli, who continued his father's profession of being a teacher at the Mustansiriyya Madrasa and served as a qāḍī, until 1393 when he was deported from Baghdad by the Timurids, who temporarily occupied the city until the Mongol Jalayirids recaptured Baghdad with assistance from the Mamluk Sultanate.

== Legacy ==
=== Al-Aquli Mosque ===
Upon his death in 1327, a mosque was built next to the grave of Ibn al-Aquli, incorporating the orphanage and his former residence into the structure. The mosque, later named "al-Aquli Mosque," was rebuilt during the Ottoman period with its most recent renovation done in 2010. Built primarily in brown marble and concrete, the mosque has a single minaret and two main prayer halls for the seasons of winter and summer, while being a highlight of Ilkhanid and Ottoman architectural styles. Al-Aquli Mosque is held under the purview of the Sunni Endowment Office, although Shi'a Muslims are welcomed to learn more about Sunnis in the mosque.

The wooden cenotaph of Ibn al-Aquli, which dates back to the Ilkhanid period, is currently held in the collection of the Iraq Museum. The present mosque has a concrete cenotaph over the grave of Ibn al-Aquli.

== See also ==
- List of Shafi'is
- List of mosques in Baghdad
