= Jadid Hassan Pasha =

Old locality in Baghdad, Iraq

1816 illustration depicting Dawud Pasha of Baghdad next to al-Sarai Mosque in the Jadid Hassan Pasha locality.

Jadid Hassan Pasha (Arabic: جديد حسن باشا, romanized: The New Ḥasan Pasha), also known originally as al-Mahla (Arabic: المحلة) is an old locality located in the Rusafa side of Baghdad, Iraq. Before the independence of the Kingdom of Iraq, the locality was home to the Ottoman imperial administration center for the Baghdad vilayet and the center of brief Mamluk administration of Iraq. The locality is home to several important sites such as al-Sarai Mosque, the Qushla administrative building, and many traditional Iraqi houses that contain still contain their old architectural features such as the shanashil.

The area is located below al-Rashid Street, and between al-Mutanabbi Street and al-Maidan Square.

== History ==
Prior, the area was known by Iraqis as al-Mahla. It wasn't until the Georgian Mamluk Hassan Pasha, who became the viceroy of the Baghdad vilayet in 1704, took the area as his administration area that the area was named in his honor. A street located in it, Zuqaq al-Sarai, was also the location of several madrasas, among them was al-Huquq School, one of the oldest modern schools in Iraq established in 1908 by Nazım Pasha during the Ottoman period. During the Hashemite period, the area was home to many of the wealthy families and politicians living in Baghdad. It also contains an old oud market that makes the instruments hand-made.

After the 2003 US invasion of Iraq, many of the original inhabitants of the area left due to the dire conditions that ensued. As of 2017, only 15 families remained living in the locality.

== Notable inhabitants ==
- Nuri al-Sa'id
- Hikmat Sulayman
- Kamil al-Jadirji
- Salih Zaki Bey
- Tahir Yahya
