= Zuqaq al-Sarai =

Street in Baghdad, Iraq

- Al-Sarai Street
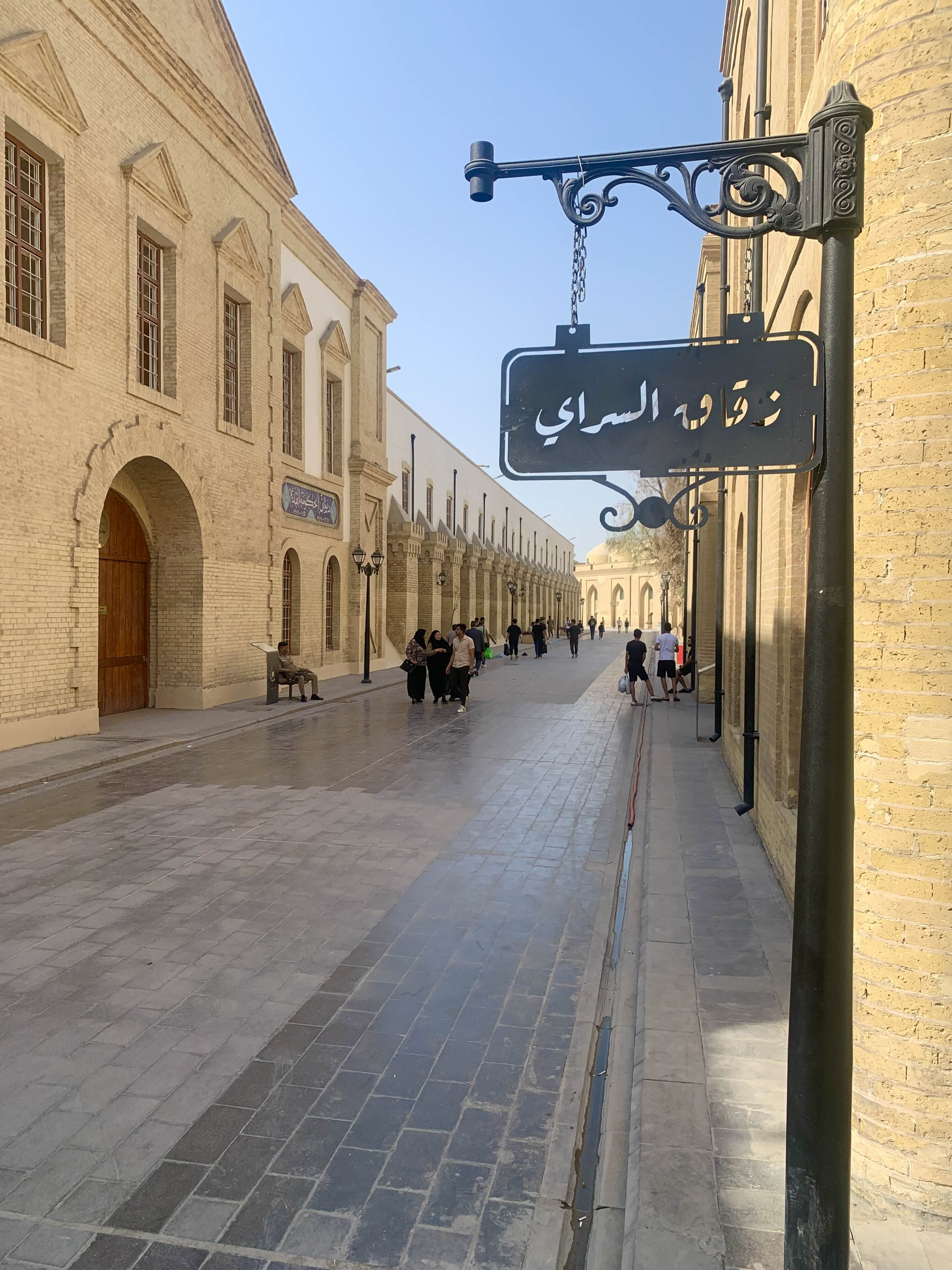
- Native name: Arabic: شارع السراي, زقاق السراي
- Part of: Old Baghdad
- Location: Baghdad, Iraq

Other
- Known for: 1. Al-Qushla Complex; 2. Souk al-Sarai; 3. Al-Sarai Mosque; 4. House of Regina Pasha

Zuqaq al-Sarai (Arabic: زقاق السراي), also known as al-Sarai Street (Arabic: شارع السراي), is an old street in Baghdad, Iraq, adjacent to al-Mutanabbi Street. The street is notable for holding the site of many Ottoman administration buildings, and cultural and historical locations.

The area and its various buildings are all listed of a tentative UNESCO World Heritage Site list as an example of the diverse and rich cultural heritage of Baghdad.

== Historical background ==
Historically the area has been part of the location in which Georgian Mamluk Hassan Pasha established his administration complex. As well as preserving the old al-Sarai Mosque in the area, as such, the area was nicknamed "New Hassan Pasha" in his honor. Al-Sarai Street was also the location of several madrasas, among them was al-Huquq School, one of the oldest modern schools in Iraq established in 1908 by Nazım Pasha during the Ottoman period.

Activity remained in the area even after the fall of the Ottoman Empire. During the 1980s and 1990s, attention was given to the street by Iraqi state officials who sought to harmonize and with the cultural heritage that occupied the areas of Zuqaq al-Sarai. Due to this, after the Gulf War the Department of Antiquities, a project to preserve old areas of Baghdad, including Zuqaq al-Sarai, was launched in late 2001. But was stopped in 2003 due to the US-led invasion of Iraq.

During 2024, al-Sarai Street saw a rehabilitation project under the supervision of the Baghdad Municipality. The project aims to restore several old and historical buildings in the area, to showcase the historical and rich culture of Iraq, and to attract tourists to the area. The street became the center of the Baghdad Day festival which started on November 10th of 2024. The festival included a showcase of Baghdadi heritage, architecture, and culture.

== Historical buildings in al-Sarai ==
=== Souk al-Sarai ===
In front of the street is Souk al-Sarai, an ancient souk that is said to date back to the Abbasid Caliphate. The souk is located in front of the al-Qushla Complex. The souk got its current name from the Ottoman Empire due to the establishment of al-Sarai administration buildings.

=== Al-Sarai Buildings Complex ===
==== Al-Qushla Complex ====
One of the most important places in the street is the al-Qushla complex which was an Ottoman military base, a government institution, and was, according to some Iraqi historians, part of the old walls of Baghdad. The construction of the complex was laid down by Namık Pasha in the early 1860s and completed by Midhat Pasha in 1868 who then established the Qushla Clock Tower so that it could alarm Ottoman military troops in the morning for times of training. The clock tower became instantly recognizable among Baghdadi citizens, although the clock itself was donated by King George V to the Iraqi government at a much later date. The complex remained in use even throughout British control of Iraq, with its main gate being the one that faces Souk al-Sarai.

==== Al-Sarai Gateway ====
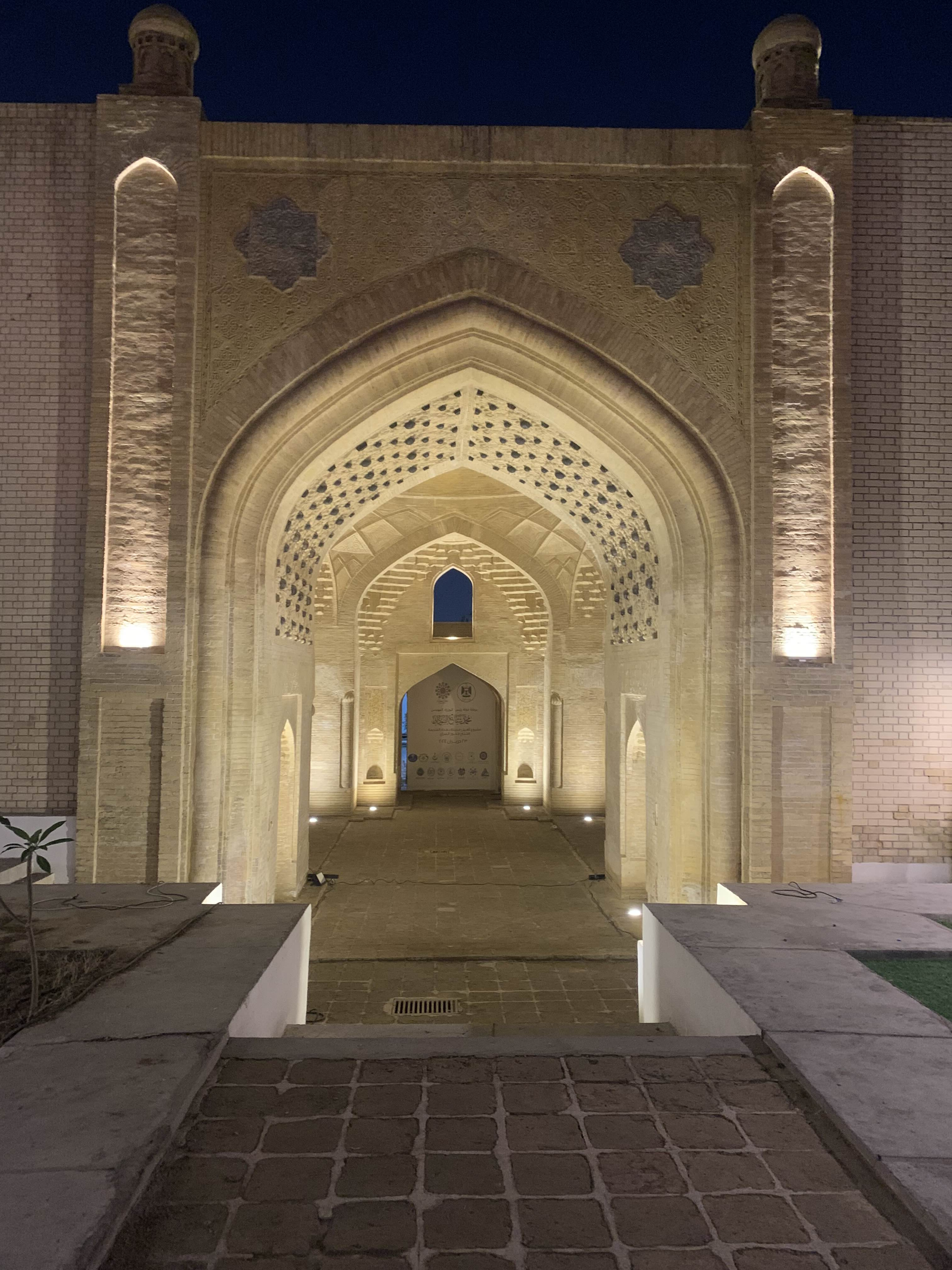
Al-Sarai Gateway located on the opposite right of the al-Qushla Complex

A gate next to the al-Qushla Complex is located on the street. This gate contains an example of prevailing Abbasid architecture which can also be found in, but not limited to, the gates and buildings of al-Mustansiriyya Madrasa and the Murjan Mosque. The gateway consists of several iwans and a dome on top of the gate to provide light to the building. The bricks that the gateway is built out of also consists of decorations and brick manipulation to create geometric shapes which was a tradition aspect of Abbasid architecture.

==== Dar al-Wali ====
During the 16th century, the Ottomans constructed a house that became the main residence of the ruling Pashas of Baghdad and their followers. Recognized as a heritage house, it contains a mix of Arab and British colonel architecture. A garden is located in the middle of the building which is surrounded by porticos containing wooden poles that overlook it. Above the main halls of the building are two small domes.

=== Al-Sarai Mosque ===
Opposite of the al-Sarai Gateway is the al-Sarai Mosque, also known as the King Ghazi Mosque or the New Hassan Pasha Mosque. The mosque is believed to predate the Ottoman Empire but was rebuilt in its current form by Sultan Suleiman the Magnificent.

=== Educational institutions ===
The street has been notable for its several madrasas and educational institutions. One of those is the Bayt al-Hikma school, also known as al-Sanai School, which was built in the position of al-Aliyya School by Midhat Pasha.

=== House of Regina Pasha ===
The House of Regina Pasha, who was a famed Iraqi Jewish entrepreneur, is located on this street. The house was a private diwaniyya for several Iraqi officials and a casino where gambling, wine tables, and art were held. The house was set up and used by Regina Pasha to gain power and wealth in Iraqi society.

== See also ==
- Al-Mutanabbi Street
- Al-Rashid Street
