= Al-Nahr Street =

Old street next to the Tigris in Baghdad, Iraq

- Native name: Arabic: شارع النهر
- Part of: Old Baghdad
- Location: Baghdad, Iraq

Other
- Known for: 1. Goldsmithing; 2. Silversmithing; 3. Clothes and textiles

Al-Nahr Street (Arabic: شارع النهر, lit. 'The River Street') is an old street and market located next to the Tigris River on the Rusafa side in Baghdad, Iraq. Built during the late Ottoman period, the street is typically recognized as the first modern street in modern Baghdad; however, this title is disputed.

== Historical background ==
Before the 20th century, Baghdad's roads mostly consisted of narrow passageways and streets reserved for covered traditional markets. All of them connected. In 1910, the Ottoman Viceroy of Baghdad, Nazım Pasha, established al-Nahr Street as a modern street. Although it's typically considered the first modern street in Baghdad, it was still a narrow road and market akin to the narrow passageways of the city. It wasn't until the last Ottoman Viceroy of Baghdad, Halil Pasha, paved al-Rashid Street, which is recognized as the first modern roadway in Baghdad. Starting from the 1930s, Russian gold from Baku became popular in Baghdad. As a result of increase immigration from foreign lands, many silversmithing stores were opened in the street. By the 1940s, the silversmithing stores expanded to include goldsmithing.

The street sold many jewelry and became the center of young female fashion starting from the 1950s until the 1970s. The shift was due to many more competing fashion stores opening around Baghdad. However, the street remained a part of collective memory for Baghdadis as the first women's street. This also gave the street the nickname "al-Banat Street."

=== Mandaean presence ===
Around the late Ottoman period, many Iraqi Mandaeans, also known as Sabeans, began immigrating to cities and setting up goldsmith shops in them. Goldsmithing and silversmithing were among the most popular occupations that the communities pursued. Al-Nahr Street was among the many locations in Baghdad's al-Rusafa that contained these stores that were run by Mandaeans. Eventually, the stores became dwelling places for the communities and evolved into neighborhoods. As such, local Mandaean gold craftsmanship became an integral part of the street.

== Present era ==
The street's status began declining following 2003. During the Iraq War, violence and kidnappings forced the Mandaean community, alongside the craftsmen, to flee the country. Influx of imported gold from Türkiye and the Gulf states also became more favorable to people than Iraqi craftsmanship. Goldsmiths and traders that remain in the street accuse the post-2003 governments of neglecting the street, the Iraqi gold industry, and creative traditional talents.
