= Salih Zaki Bey =

Iraqi politician and military officer (1900–1969)

- صالح زكي بك
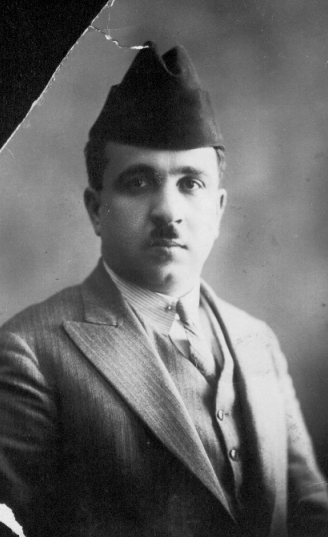

Ministry of Defense

Personal details
- Born: 1900 Baghdad, Ottoman Empire
- Died: 1969 (aged 68–69) Baghdad, Ba'athist Iraq

Salih Zaki Bey (Arabic: صالح زكي بك, 1900–1969) was an Iraqi Turcomen politician in the Kingdom of Iraq.

== Biography ==
Salih Zaki was born around 1900 in al-Dankajiyya neighborhood located on the Rusafa side of Baghdad. His family then moved to the Jadid Hassan Pasha neighborhood. His full name was Salih Zaki bin Hasan Effendi bin Muhammad Effendi Āl Shaker. He belonged to the Shaker Effendi family of Baghdad, a family of Turkish origin tracing its lineage back to the Arab tribes that inhabited Anatolia.

His family had a majlis in Baghdad known as the Āl Shaker Effendi Council. His father, Hasan Effendi, and his uncle, Abd al-Razzaq Effendi, held important administrative positions in the Ottoman state. From his family, his brother, Isma'il Haqqi Bey, held the position of head of the military court, and his cousin, Musa Kadhim Bey, held many administrative and judicial positions during the era of the Kingdom of Iraq, and his cousin, Salman Faiq, was a famous surgeon.

Salih learned to write and read the Qur'an in the traditional schools (kuttab) as a child. He studied under Baghdad scholars and completed his primary education in Baghdad schools in 1917. In 1925, after the fall of Baghdad and the establishment of the Kingdom of Iraq, he joined an administrative training course, after which he obtained an administrative position in the Iraqi army. He progressed through the ranks until he became the head of the accounts department in the Ministry of Defense, and then retired at the end of the 1950s.
