= Deema Shehabi =

Kuwaiti-born poet and writer (born 1970)

- Born: 1970 (age 55–56); Kuwait
- Education: Tufts University, Boston University
- Occupations: poet, editor, artist

Deema Shehabi (Arabic: ديمة الشهابي) (born 1970) is a Palestinian-American poet and writer. She has widely published in journals and wrote her first book of poetry in 2011. It was followed by an anthology which she co-edited in 2012 in response to the bombing of Baghdad's historic literary district and in 2014 a collaboration with another exiled poet of a collection of renga-style poems.

== Biography ==
Shehabi was born in Kuwait in 1970. She is of Palestinian heritage; her mother was from Gaza and her father from Jerusalem. She attended The American School of Kuwait, with other Palestinian exiles. The Kuwait of her childhood was a haven for freedom, education, work and a place where she learned to be proud of her Palestinian culture. In 1988, she came to the United States to attend Tufts University and attained a BA in history and international relations. She earned a Master's in 1993 in journalism from Boston University.

She is the vice president of Radius of Arab-American Writers, Inc. (RAWI), and has sponsored national events annually since 2009 to bring artists together.

Shehabi has published poems in many journals including Contemporary Arab-American Poetry, Crab Orchard, DMQ Review, Drunken Boat, The Kenyon Review, Literary Imagination, Poetry London and The Poetry of Arab Women among others and was nominated for a Pushcart prize four times. Her work has been translated into Arabic, Persian, and French. Her first book, Thirteen Departures from the Moon, was published in 2011 and through poetry discussed the feeling of being trapped between two worlds. A special section of American Book Review in its November–December 2012 issue reviewed Arab American literature. Shehabi was one of the authors whose works were reviewed in-depth and was mentioned elsewhere in the issue as masterful in her use of ghazal.

In response to the 2007 bombing in Baghdad's Al-Mutanabbi Street, the historic literary district, Shehabi and Beau Beausoleil edited an anthology in 2012 called Al-Mutanabbi Street Starts Here of people's responses to the bombing. Contributors include Yassin Alsalman and Pulitzer prize-winning journalist Anthony Shadid; Rijin Sahakian, U.S.-based Iraqi television producer and Nazik Al-Malaika as part of the 100 participants. The book won the 2013 Recognition Award from the Northern California Book Awards presented 19 May 2013 at the San Francisco Public Library. Rebecca Foust, Dartmouth Poet in Residence at the Frost Place, praised the editing of alternating prose and poetry as creating a coherent rhythm and a powerful reminder that what happened on Al-Mutanabbi Street could happen anywhere.

Her most recent publication is a collaboration with a Jewish-American poet, Marilyn Hacker, written in the style of a Japanese renga, a form of alternating call and answer. The book, Diaspo/renga: a collaboration in alternating renga explores the emotional journey of living in exile. The collaboration began in 2009 as an exchange of poems expressing thoughts on the 2008-2009 Gaza hostilities. It is an interweaving of dialogue on the conflict, which explores the inability to be apathetic, as war remains in the mind as the background of even mundane daily tasks.

== Selected works ==
- Shehabi, Deema. "Requiem for Arrival", Mississippi Review, Volume 32 No. 3 (2004), pp 263–264
- Shehabi, Deema. "At the Dome of the Rock", Mississippi Review, Volume 32 No. 3 (2004), p 262
- Shehabi, Deema. "The Narrative", The Kenyon Review, Volume 30 No. 1 (2008), pp 115–117
- Shehabi, Deema. "Helwa's Stories", The Massachusetts Review, Volume 50 No. 1–2 (April 2009), pp 144–147
- Shehabi, Deema. "Ghazal", Callaloo, Volume 32 No. 4 (December 2009), p 1161
- Shehabi, Deema. Thirteen departures from the moon: poems, Press 53, Winston-Salem, NC (2011) (ISBN 978-1-935708-23-0)
- Beausoleil, Beau and Deema Shehabi, eds. Al-Mutanabbi Street Starts Here: Poets and Writers Respond to the March 5th, 2007, Bombing of Baghdad's "Street of the Booksellers", PM Press, Oakland, CA (2012) (ISBN 978-1-60486-590-5)
- Hacker, Marilyn and Deema K Shehabi. Diaspo/renga: a collaboration in alternating renga, Holland Park Press, London (2014) (ISBN 978-1-90732-042-2)
