= Yakub Cemil =

Ottoman revolutionary (1883 – 1916)

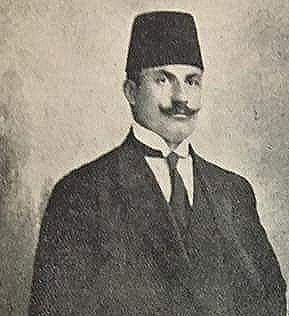

Personal details
- Born: 1883 Istanbul, Ottoman Empire
- Died: 11 September 1916 (aged 32/33) Istanbul, Ottoman Empire
- Party: Committee of Union and Progress

Yakub Cemil (1883 – 11 September 1916) was an Ottoman revolutionary and soldier who assassinated Nazım Pasha during the 1913 Ottoman coup d'état.

During the Caucasus campaign, troops under Yakub Cemil's command carried out some of the first major massacres of Armenians following the defeat of the Ottoman Army in several battles against the Russians, such as the Battle of Sarikamish.

In 1916, he was arrested, sentenced to death, and executed after attempting to overthrow the government.

== Sources ==
- Badem, Candan (2019). "The War at The Caucasus Front: A Matrix for Genocide". The End of the Ottomans: of Turkish Nationalism. Bloomsbury Academic. pp. 47–66. ISBN 978-1-78831-241-7.
