= Hassan Pasha (Mamluk) =

First Mamluk Vali of Baghdad (1704-1723)

Hassan Pasha ჰასან ფაშა
- Governor of Baghdad
- Reign: 1704 – 1723
- Predecessor: Vizier Ali Pasha
- Successor: Ahmad Pasha
- Born: 1657
- Died: 1723 (aged 65–66)
- Burial: Adhamiyah
- Spouse: Aishah Khanim
- Issue: Ahmad Pasha; Fatimah Khanim; Safiyyah Khanim
- House: Mamluk dynasty

Ḥassan Pasha (Arabic: حسن باشا, Georgian: ჰასან ფაშა, 1657–1723) was the governor of Baghdad in Ottoman Iraq from 1704 until his death in 1723 and the founder of the Mamluk state of Iraq. Of Georgian origin, he succeeded Vizier Ali Pasha. He was the father of Ahmad Pasha, who succeeded him as governor as well as the grandfather of Adila Khatun, the wife of Sulaiman Abu Layla who would also take the position after Ahmad Pasha.

== Biography ==
By the beginning of the 18th century, Baghdad under Ottoman rule had an extremely disorganized political system and order. The Janissaries were effectively the masters of the city with various Arab tribes controlling the surroundings of Ottoman Iraq. Trade and peace suffered. Baghdad and Basra were placed in the salyane system where taxation was farmed out to the governors. Constant war with the Iranian Safavid Empire had weakened Ottoman control further. By the 1700s the situation had worsened. The area suffered from being the battleground between the Ottoman and Safavid empires. As such, Hassan Pasha was appointed governor in 1704 by Constantinople to bring stability to the region. Born in 1657 to a sipahi of Murad IV, Hassan Pasha was well educated and had distinguished himself in various eyalets across the Empire. Pasha, along with his son Ahmad, began their careers fighting Iranian forces and defending the area from Nader Shah's control and had even fought deep into Iranian territory such as in Kermanshah.

On 16 June 1704, Hassan Pasha officially became the Vali of Baghdad and immediately became popular among Baghdadis. The two were charged with the mission of retaking Iraq. Hassan, along with his son, defeated the Arabian and Kurdish tribes and imposed law and order. Accounts of this struggle are well documented in Iraqi chronicles of the era, as are many battles in the period. After this, Hassan began building houses and schools and provided new job opportunities for Baghdadi Sunni Muslim scholars to study in them. His son, Ahmad Pasha, would follow his father's examples.

Hassan Pasha took an interest in the Islamic shrines of Najaf and Karbala. In 1705, he made a visit to Karbala to visit the Imam Husayn Shrine, which included the resting place of Husayn ibn Ali. He also visited al-Abbas Shrine, which contained the resting place of al-Abbas bin Ali, brother of Husayn. Hassan chose Karbala as a starting point for his restoration of the cities which he now ruled. He ordered the channels of Karbala to be cleaned, and restored the Khan al-Hammad Castle, which is a khan (caravanserai) located on the road between Karbala and Najaf.

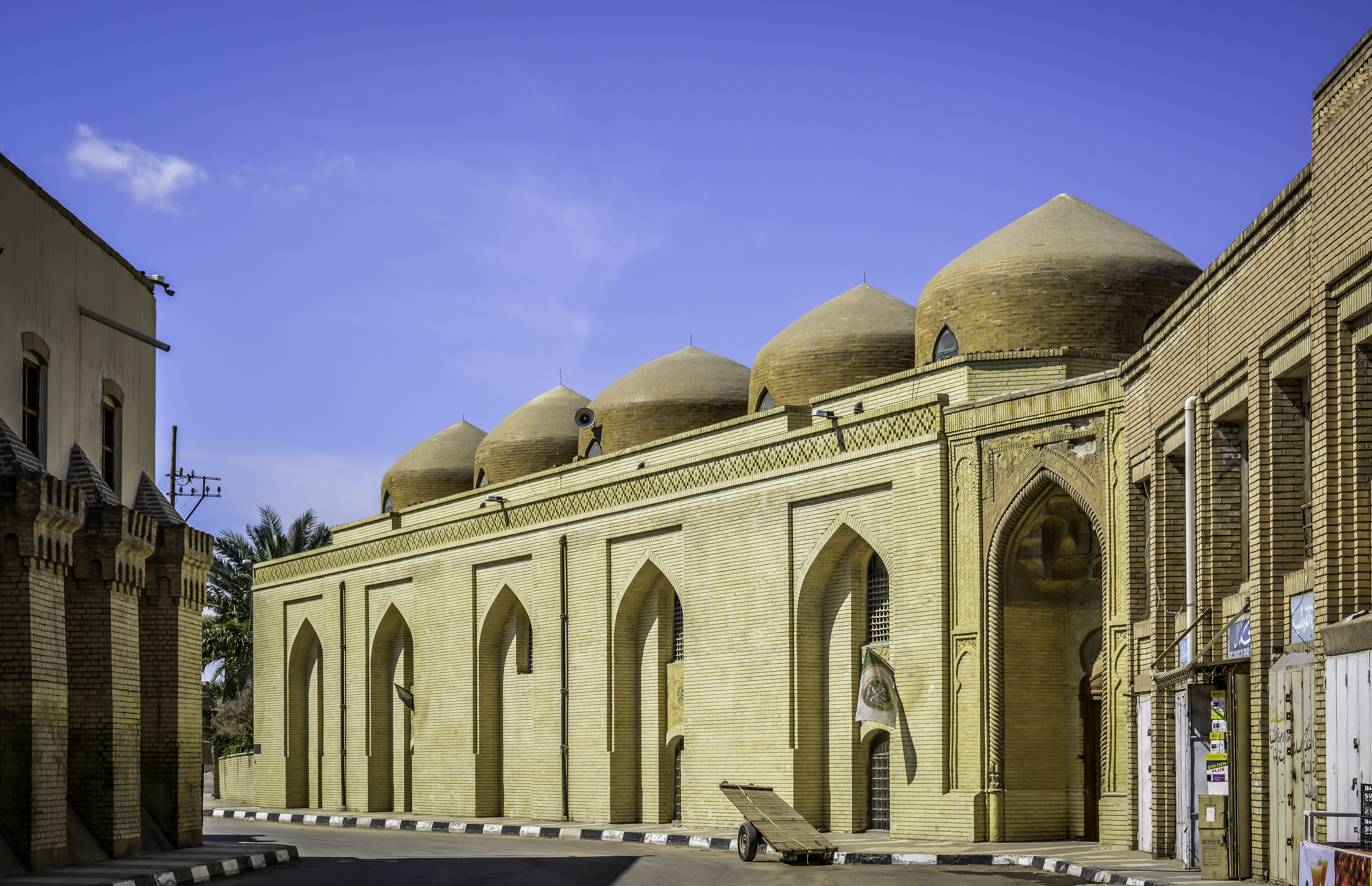
Al-Sarai Mosque, also known as Hassan Pasha Mosque

Hassan Pasha's rule in Iraq brought a new era of stability. In Baghdad, he trained and introduced both Circassian and Georgian Mamluk troops to keep the janissaries in check and protect the city from possible Iranian threats. This effectively laid the foundation of the Mamluk dynasty's rule over Iraq which lasted until 1831. Order was restored under Hassan Pasha. Notably, Hassan Pasha abolished taxes on firewood and foodstuffs and ordered many construction projects. This includes the construction of many houses, inspired by his own background, and the renewal of the ancient Abbasid al-Sarai Mosque, which would be given a new nickname, the New Hassan Pasha Mosque. The locality where Hassan Pasha established his administration and al-Sarai Mosque is also located was given the name "New Hassan Pasha locality" in his honor.

== Family and death ==
Hassan Pasha was married to Aishah Khanim, a daughter of an Ottoman courtier. They had one son, Ahmad Pasha and at least two daughters, Fatimah Khanim and Safiyyah Khanim. Aishah died in 1717. Hassan Pasha died in 1723 and was buried in al-A'dhamiyya. His son, Ahmad Pasha, succeeded him in his position and expanded his foundations, allowing the Mamluk dynasty, along with the Mamluk elite that they created during their rule, to rule from Baghdad to Basra until it was dismantled in 1831.

== Legacy ==
The Iraqi Mamluk dynasty is a rare example in history of slaves rising to power with the succession. Hassan Pasha purchased hundreds of Georgian slave children, educating them for civil service to the Ottoman Empire. This included Sulayman Abu Layla, who later married Hassan Pasha's granddaughter Adila Khatun and became governor of Baghdad. Hassan is remembered for his achievements in Baghdad and for creating stability in Iraq. Many future Mamluk pashas would follow in his and his son's footsteps.

== See also ==
- Mamluk dynasty (Iraq)
- Jalili dynasty
