= Mutanabbi Street =

Ancient book market and street in Baghdad, Iraq

Coordinates: 33°20′27″N 44°23′20″E

Al-Mutanabbi Street
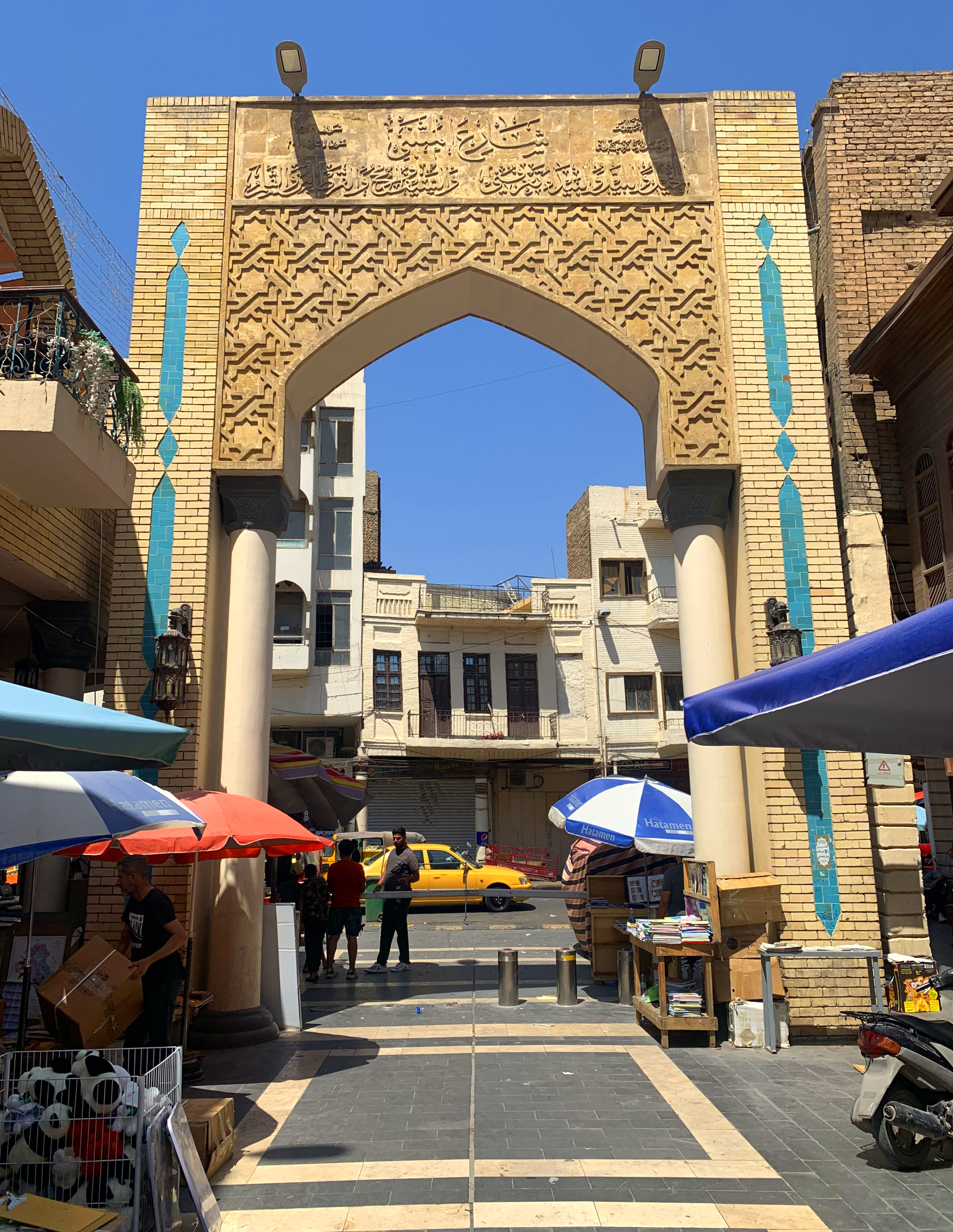
- The main gate to the Street.
- Interactive map of Al-Mutanabbi Street
- Native name: Arabic: شارع المتنبي
- Length: 1 km (0.62 mi)
- Location: Baghdad, Iraq

Other
- Status: Active

Al-Mutanabbi Street (Arabic: شارع المتنبي) is located in Baghdad, Iraq, near the old quarter of Baghdad; at al-Rashid Street. The street is the historic center of Baghdad bookselling, a street filled with bookstores and outdoor book stalls. Named after the classical Iraqi poet al‑Mutanabbi, the street has been referred to as the heart and soul of the Baghdad intelligentsia.

Al-Mutanabbi Street is considered the most famous street in all of Iraq due to its ancient history and community. The Street is crowded from the early hours of the morning until late at night with visitors including poets, writers, artists and students as well as tourists from all over the world.

== Description ==
Al-Mutanabbi Street is a narrow car-free street in the middle of Baghdad near the Tigris river. It's lined with freshly-painted and sparkling shops with Fairy lights garlanded the ornate brick facades and wrought iron balconies. It contains art exhibitions, gallery openings, book fairs, festivals and cafés such as Shabandar Café as well as an entrance to the Qushla. Over the decades, al-Mutanabbi Street evolved into a symbol of intellectual freedom, attracting writers, artists and dissenting voices from across the country. It gave birth to the well-known Arab saying “Cairo writes, Beirut publishes, and Baghdad reads."

Stretching for just under one kilometer, the street begins with an arch adorned with the poet’s quotes and ends with a statue of al-Mutanabbi built by sculptor Mohammed Ghani Hikmat overlooking the Tigris River.

== Historical background ==
=== Early establishment and significance ===
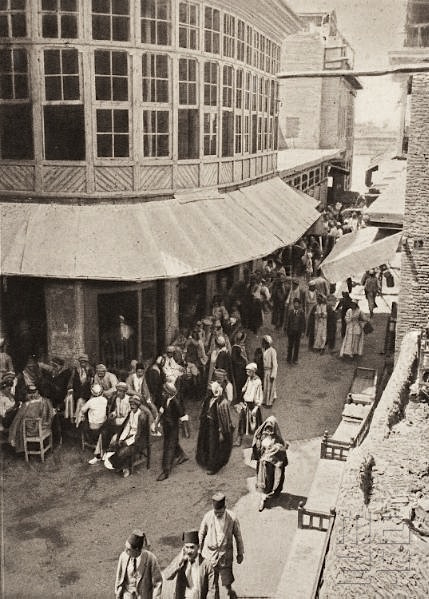
The street in 1920.

The history of the street goes back to the Abbasid Caliphate where it became the first book traders' market in Baghdad. The street served as a contemporary witness to the political and cultural changes taking place in the region. Al-Mutanabbi Street was first inaugurated in 1932 by King Faisal I and named after the celebrated 10th-century poet Abu al-Tayyib al-Mutanabbi, an Abbasid period poet. The street began to attract business such as printing houses and bookshops, which were nestled alongside the government offices and courts and over time it began to build its own identity as book sellers started to come in. Although, over time with the many regimes Iraq witnesses, many of its books reflected the ideologies of said regimes. During the era of Abd al-Karim Qasim, most of the books available were Marxist writings. After that, the street witnessed three decades of nationalistic Pan-Arabic works that traders were only allowed to sell to that glorified the Ba'ath ideology and later former-President Saddam Hussein.

The Street is also the home to the Shabandar Café which was opened in 1917. Ever since its establishment, it became a meeting place for Iraqi politicians and intellectuals. As well as being a starting point for the demonstrations taking place in the country throughout its modern history, condemning the British occupation of Iraq and some of the treaties concluded by the governments of Iraq at that time such as the Portsmouth Treaty in 1948. Among the people who are associated with the café is former-Iraqi Prime Minister Nuri al-Said who used to frequent it. Nuri al-Said's frequent visits had a big significance in making the café a gathering place for Iraqi politicians.

Under Saddam Hussein's reign, many books were banned for decades due to not agreeing with the government's standards. Some of them were replaced with to be replaced by books dealing with the history and present of Iraq. Today, books such as "The American Iraq" by the thinker Hassan al-Alawi, the books of the Palestinian historian Hanna Batatu, and the books of the Iraqi sociologist Ali al-Wardi are being sold in the street. Until 2003, these books were sold in secret, fearing arrests and suppression.

=== Revival after 2003 ===
During the Iraq War, a car bomb or suicide bomb exploded and killed 26 people on al-Mutanabbi Street on March 5, 2007, leaving the area littered and unsafe for shoppers, and destroying many businesses. In response to the bombing, Deema Shehabi and Beau Beausoleil edited an anthology in 2012 called Al-Mutanabbi Street Starts Here of people's responses to the bombing. The 100 contributors included Yassin Alsalman and Pulitzer prize-winning journalist Anthony Shadid, among others. On December 18, 2008, Iraqi Prime Minister Nouri al-Maliki officially reopened the street after a long period of cleanup and repair.

The street remains open with various renovations including redoing the street and pavements in stone, installing a new lighting system, and painting the buildings on the main street. Before the renovations, the street was described as dark and full of stray dogs. Although some of the sellers on the street criticized the renovations due to not looking like what the street used to look like.

Pictures from al-Mutanabbi Street

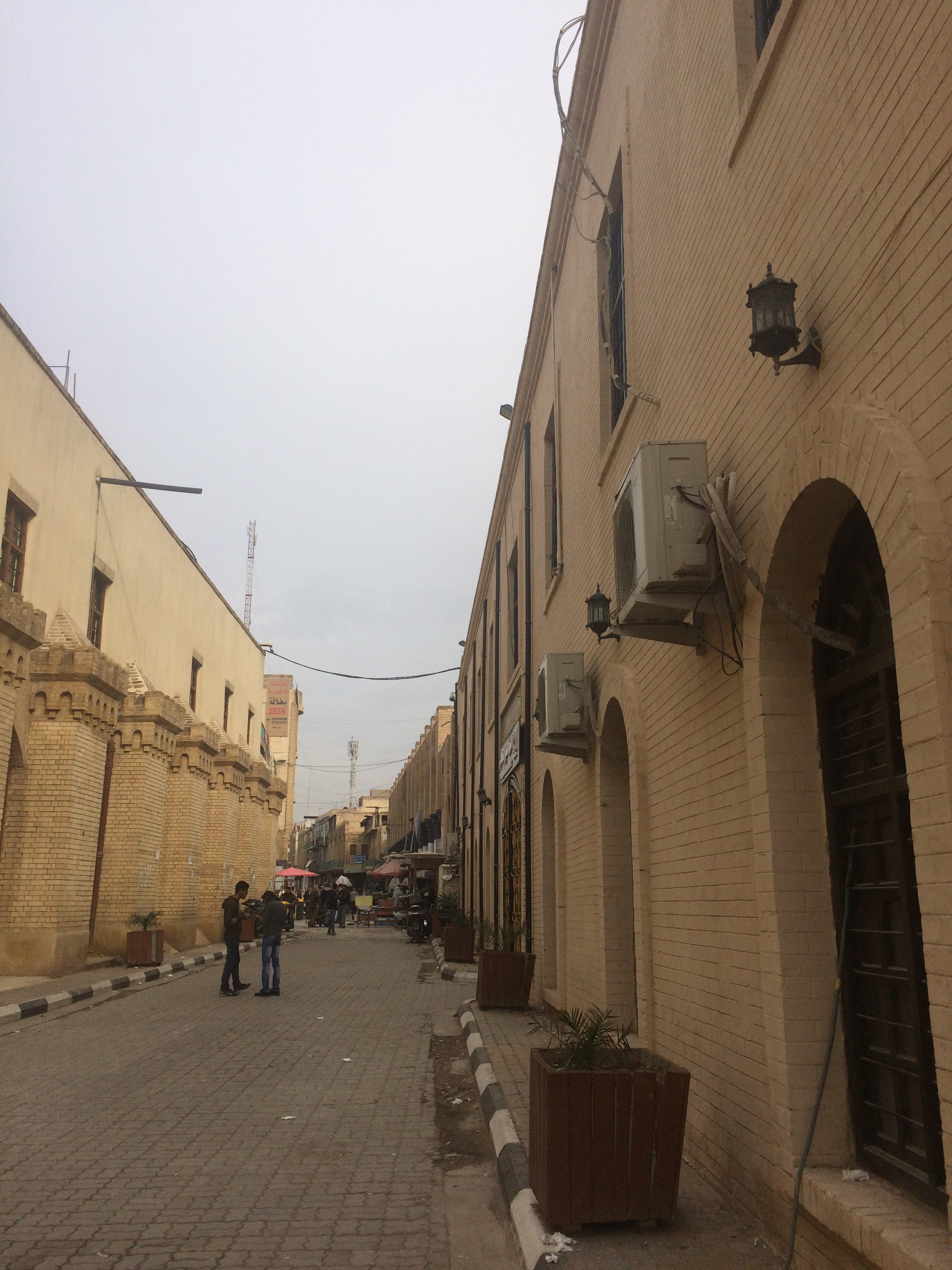
The buildings on the end of al-Mutanabbi Street

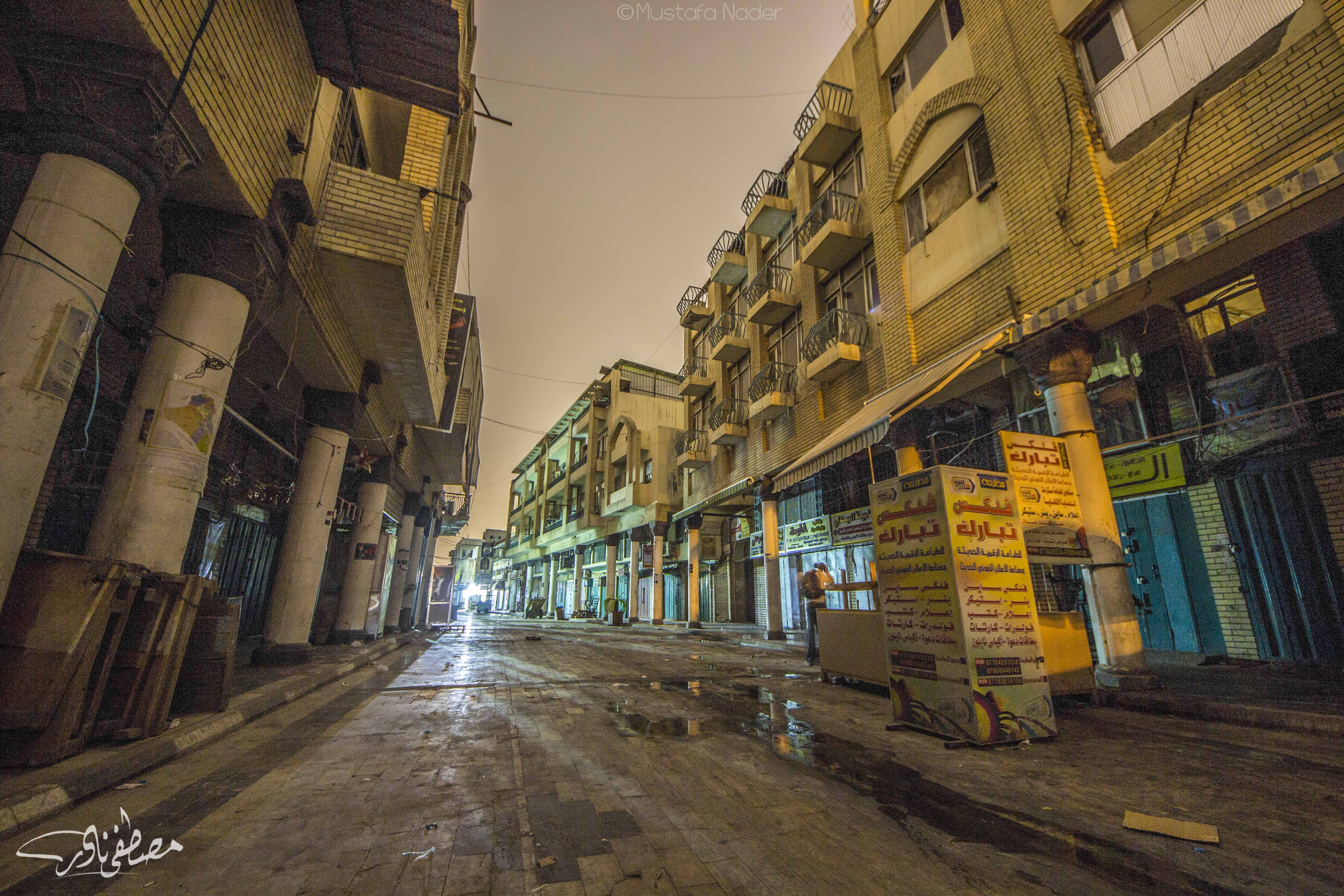
Picture from 2017 featuring an evening scene in the street

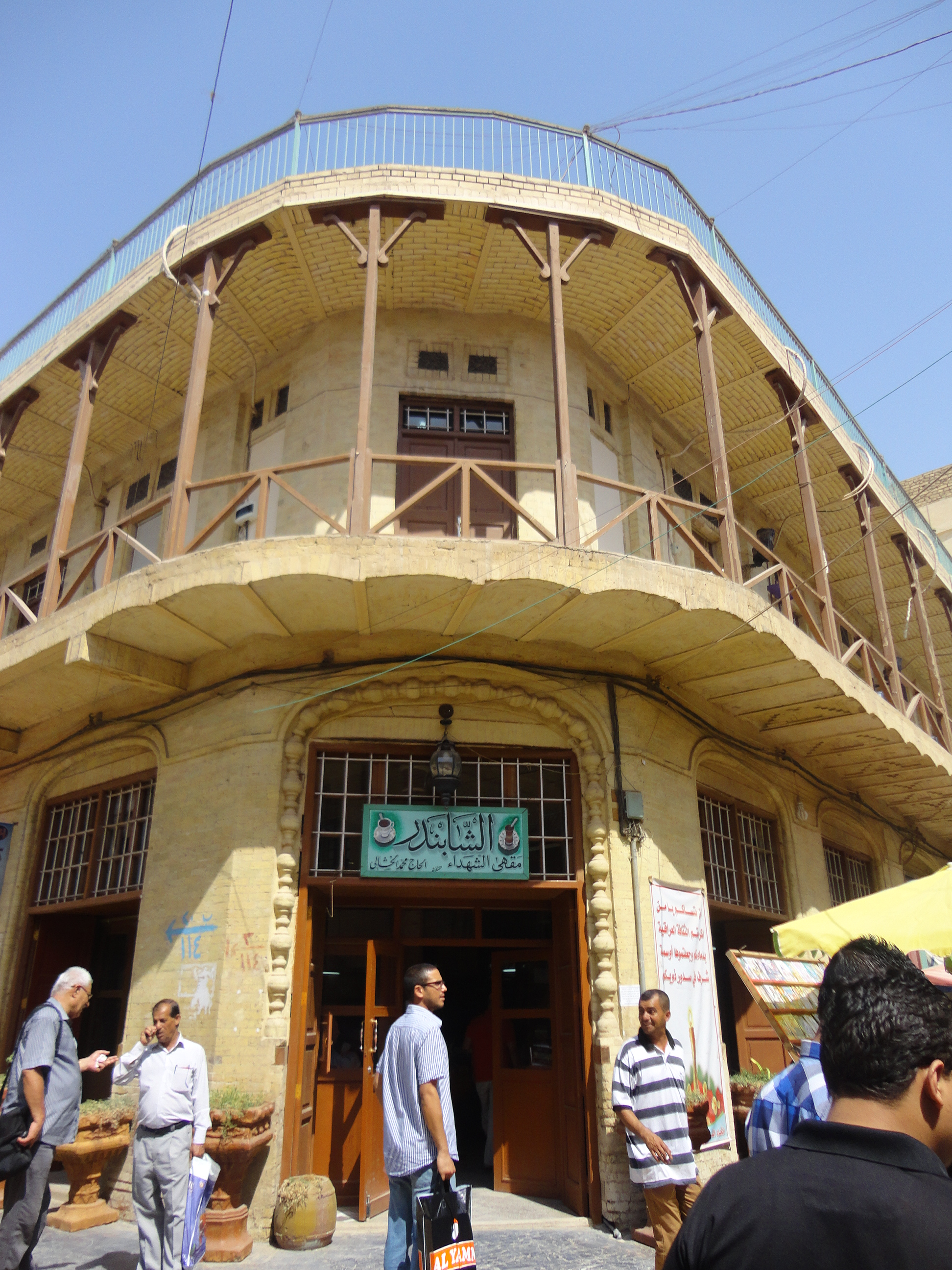
The exterior of the Shabandar Café

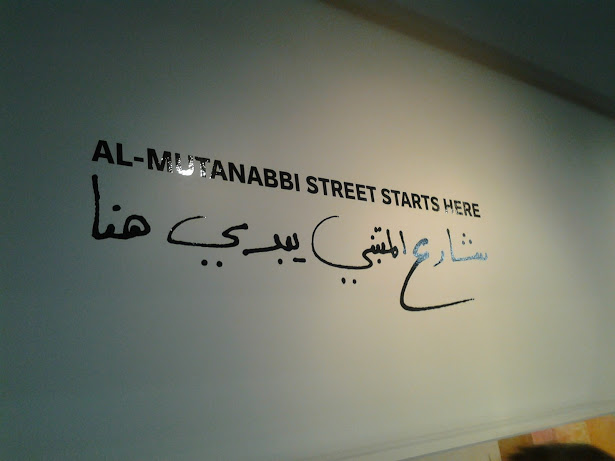
"Al-Mutanabbi Street Starts Here" project sign

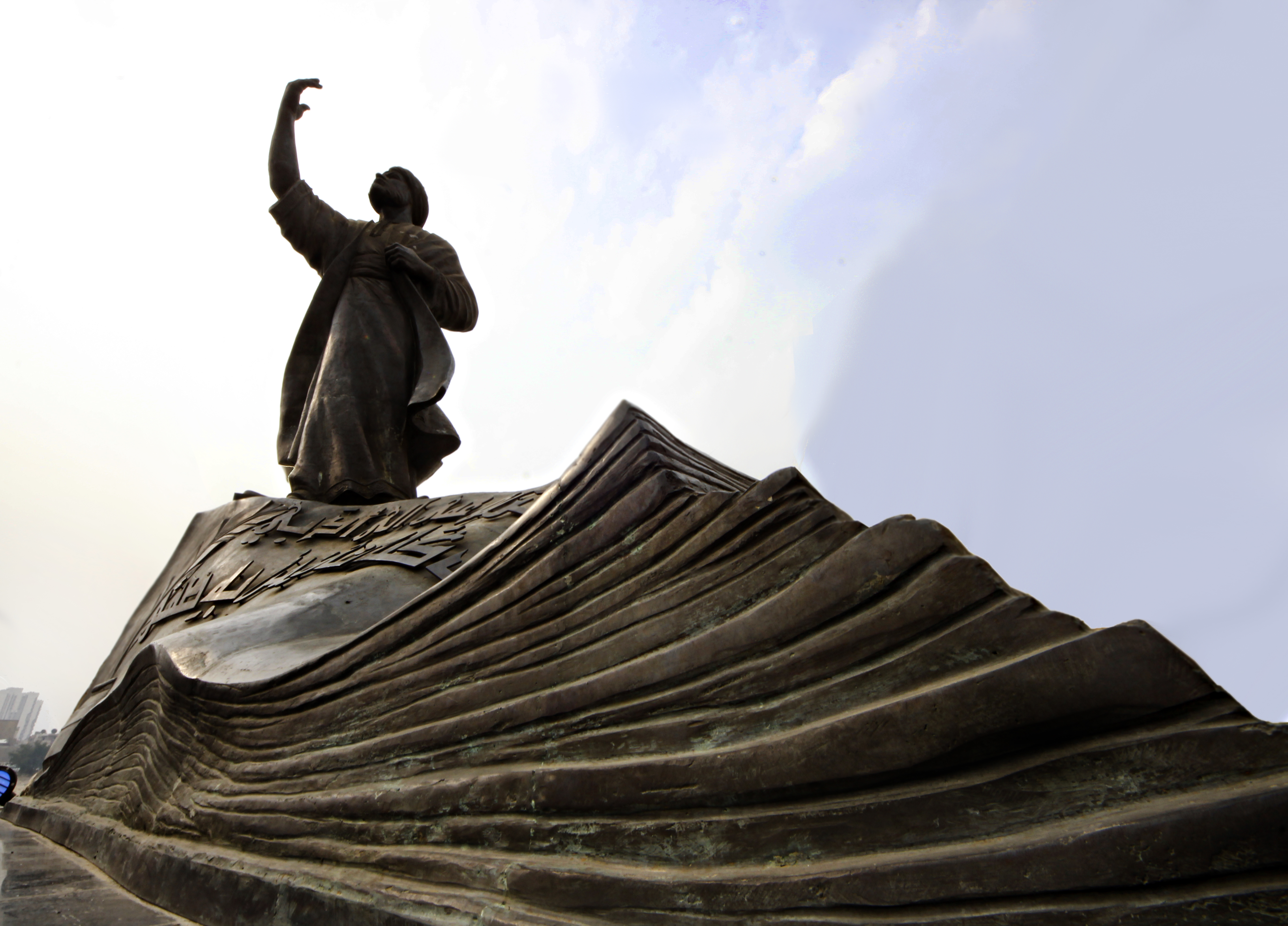
Statue of the poet, al-Mutanabbi, located at the end of the street

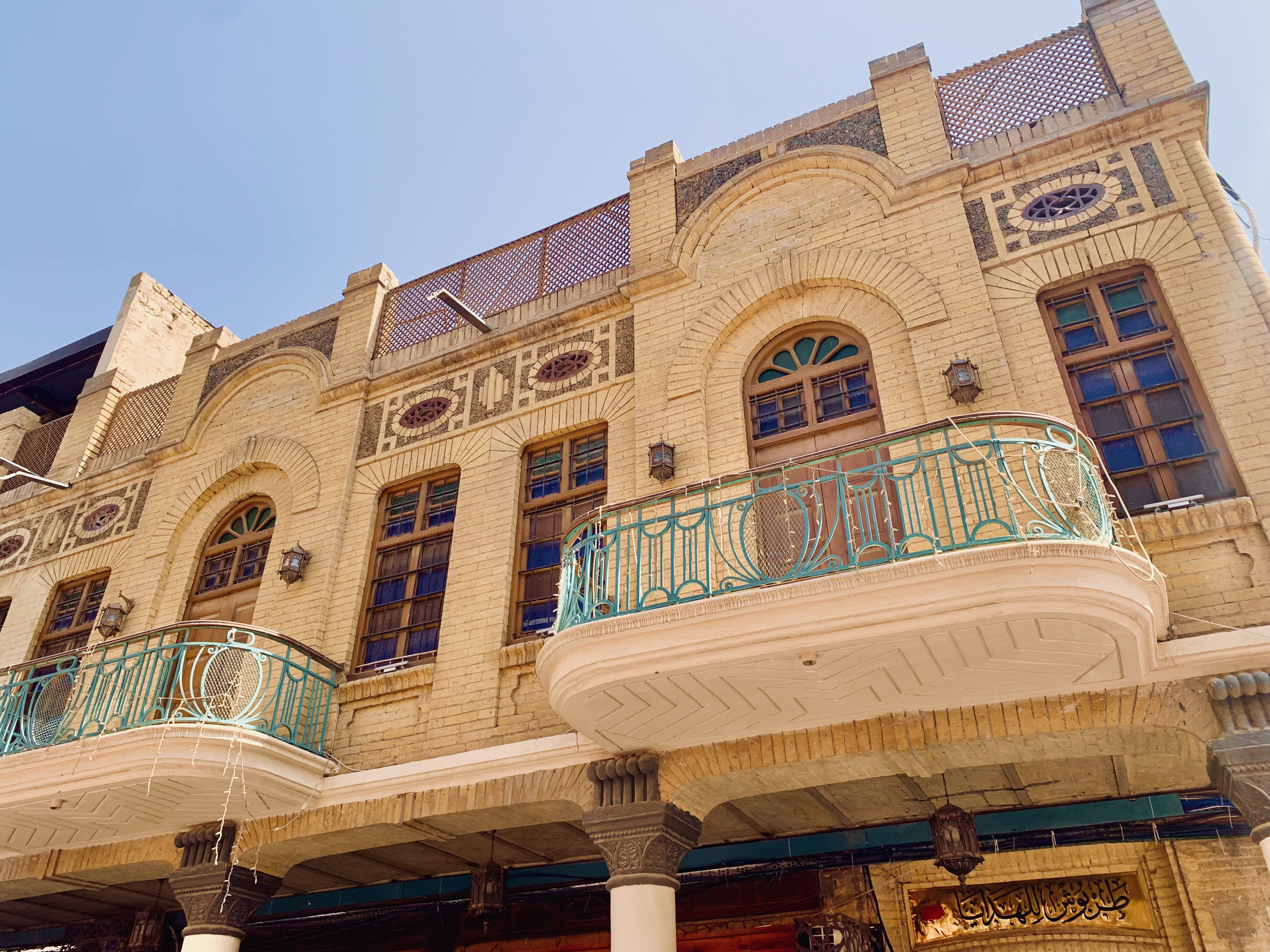
Ancient apartment located in the street

== Sights of interest ==
=== Al-Mutanabbi statue ===
Al-Mutanabbi statue (Arabic: تمثال المتنبي) is a bronze statue of the poet which the street was named after. It was sculpted by Iraqi sculptor and artist Mohammed Ghani Hikmat in 1977.

=== The Qushla ===
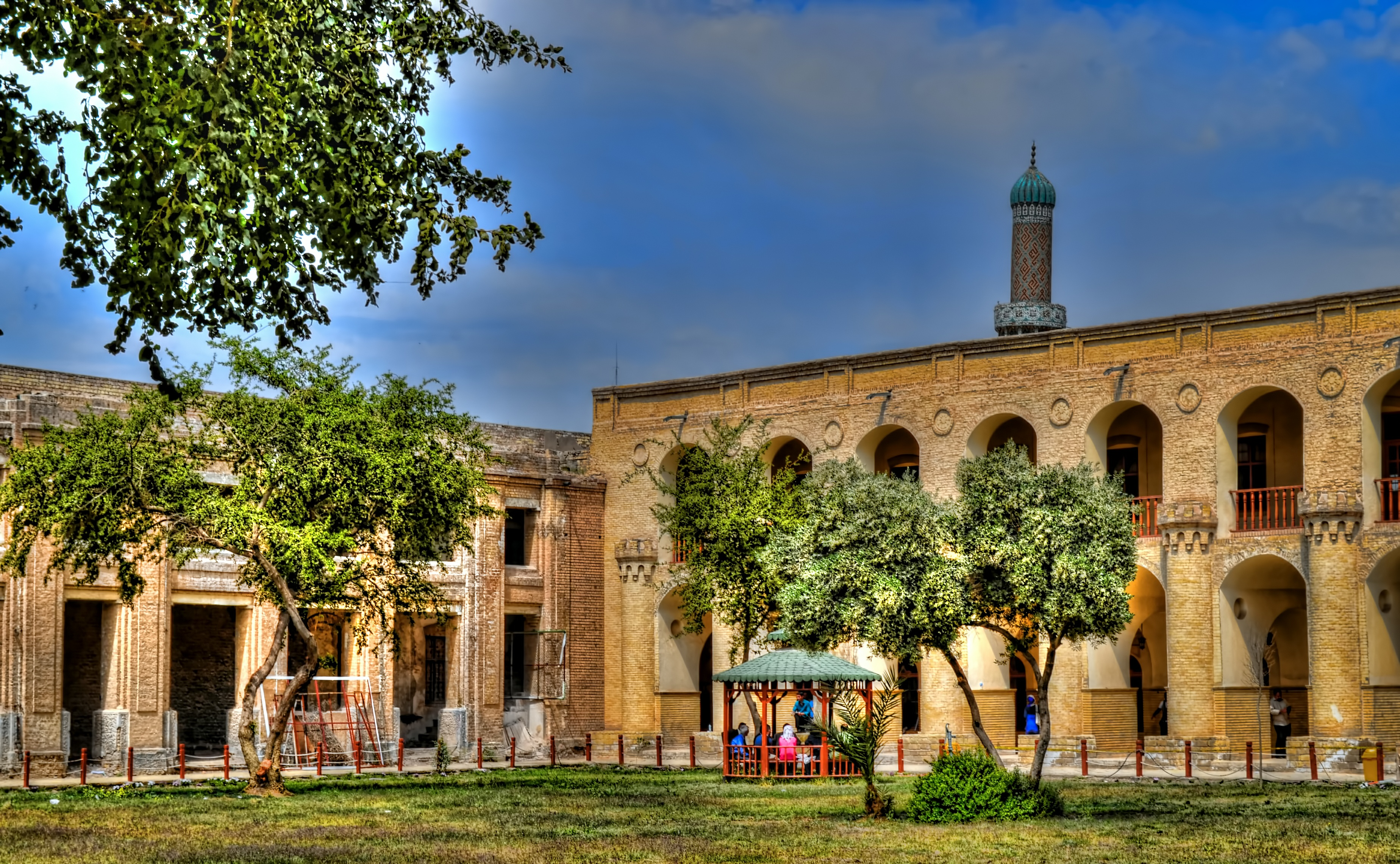
The Qushla's exterior.

The Qushla (Arabic: القشلة) is a significant Ottoman site and a Baghdadi heritage landmark, whose construction dates back to the second half of the 19th century, when Baghdad was a province of the Ottoman Empire in the orders of Midhat Pasha. Its located at the end of the Tigris River at the end of al-Mutanabbi Street where it was used as an army building for the Military of the Ottoman Empire which provided security for the population at the time. In the middle of it is a 22 meters long clock tower that was built to wake up soldiers to inform them about military training. Currently, the Qushla is a meeting place for many visitors and tourists to al-Mutanabbi Street and a place for cultural and social activities and art exhibitions.

=== Shabandar Café ===
Located in the street, Shabandar Café (Arabic: مقهى الشابندر) is one of the oldest surviving cafes in Baghdad. Since its establishment in 1917, the café was a gathering of Iraqi politicians and intellectuals and a starting point for the protests taking place during the mandate of Mesopotamia. Pictures hanging on its walls represent Iraqi history and society, including the symbols, literary and artistic figures of Baghdad. The Café was destroyed in the suicide bombing in 2007 and it took five of the owner's children. The Café has since been restored.

=== Souk al-Sarai ===
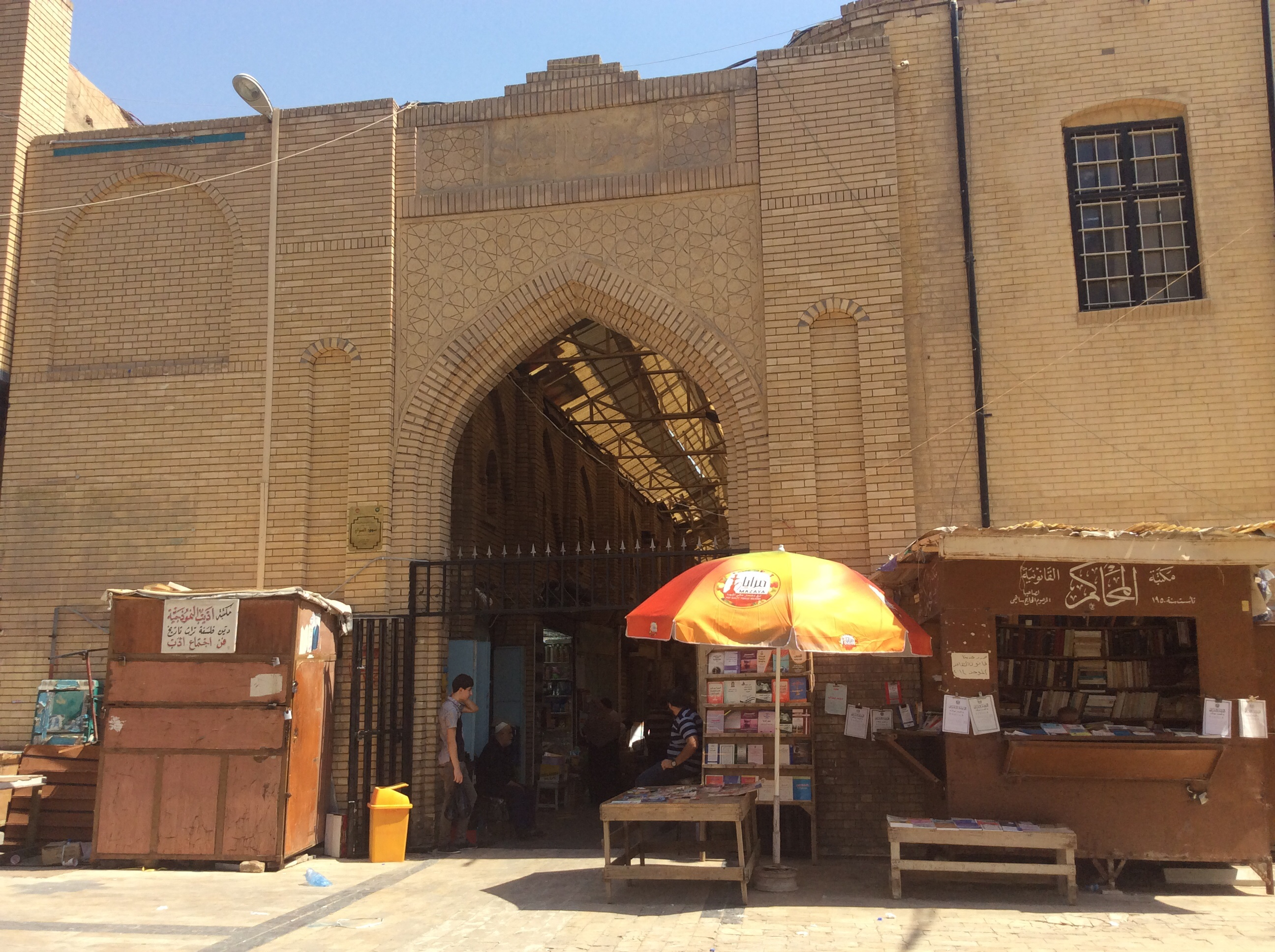
The entrance to Souk al-Sarai at the end of al-Mutanabbi Street.

Souk al-Sarai (Arabic: سوق السراي) is one of the oldest souks in Baghdad and acts as an extension of al-Mutanabbi Street. It was previously famous for the manufacture and trade of natural leather but currently, it is popular for trading notebooks, papers, and school books. The entrance of the Souk is located at the end of al-Mutanabbi Street and in front of al-Sarai Mosque which was built in 1660 which coincided with the construction of the Souk. The length of the marketplace does not exceed 300 meters, and the width of the pedestrian path does not exceed three meters.

== Gallery ==
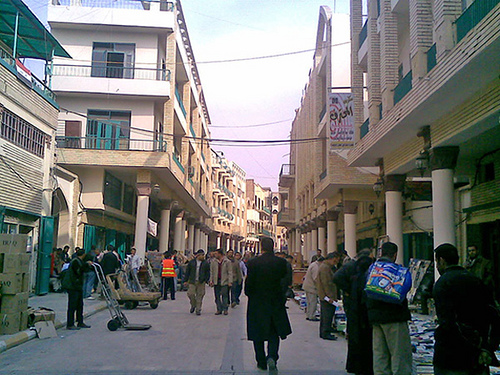
The street in 2009.

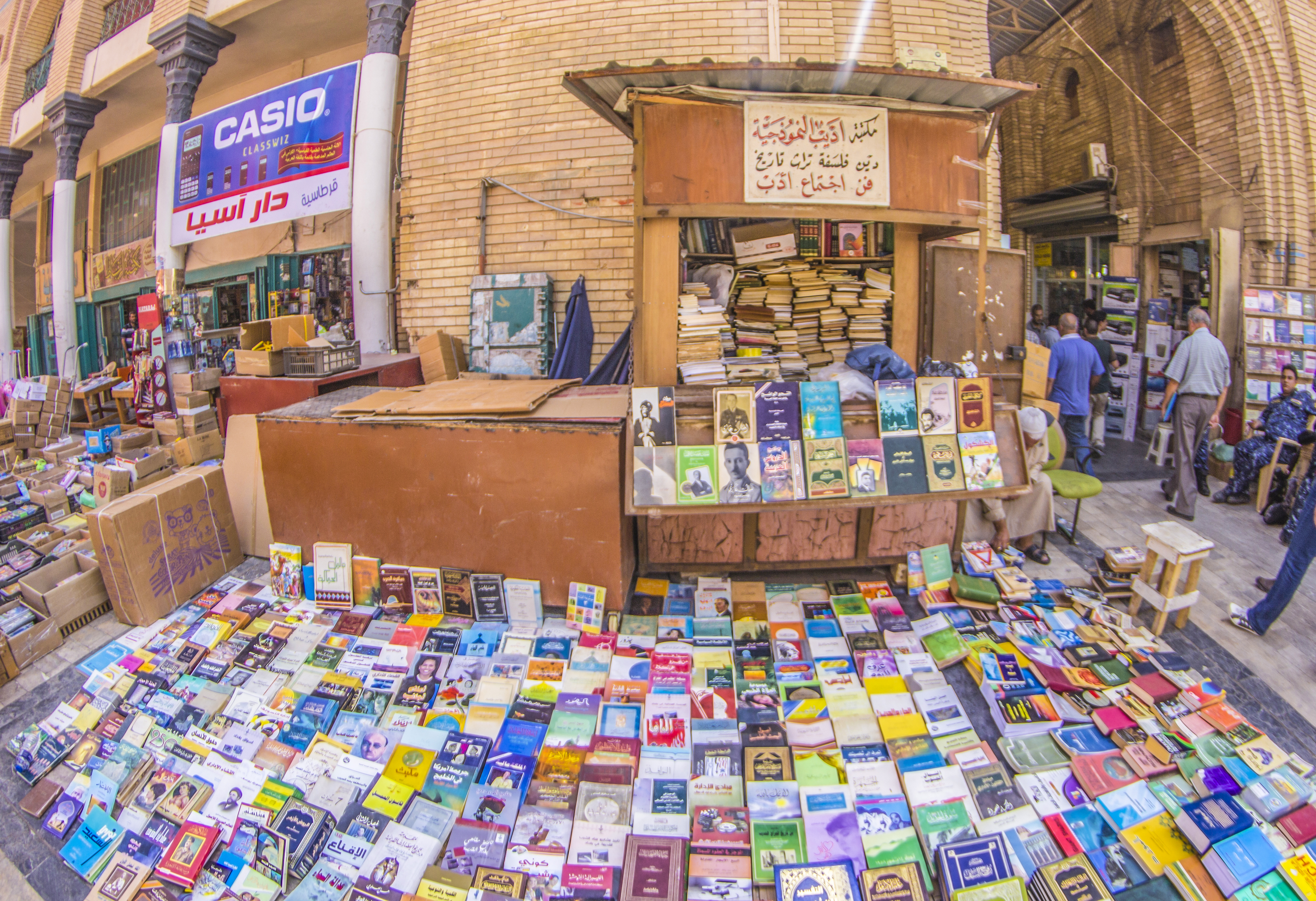
One of the many books being sold on the sidewalks of the street.

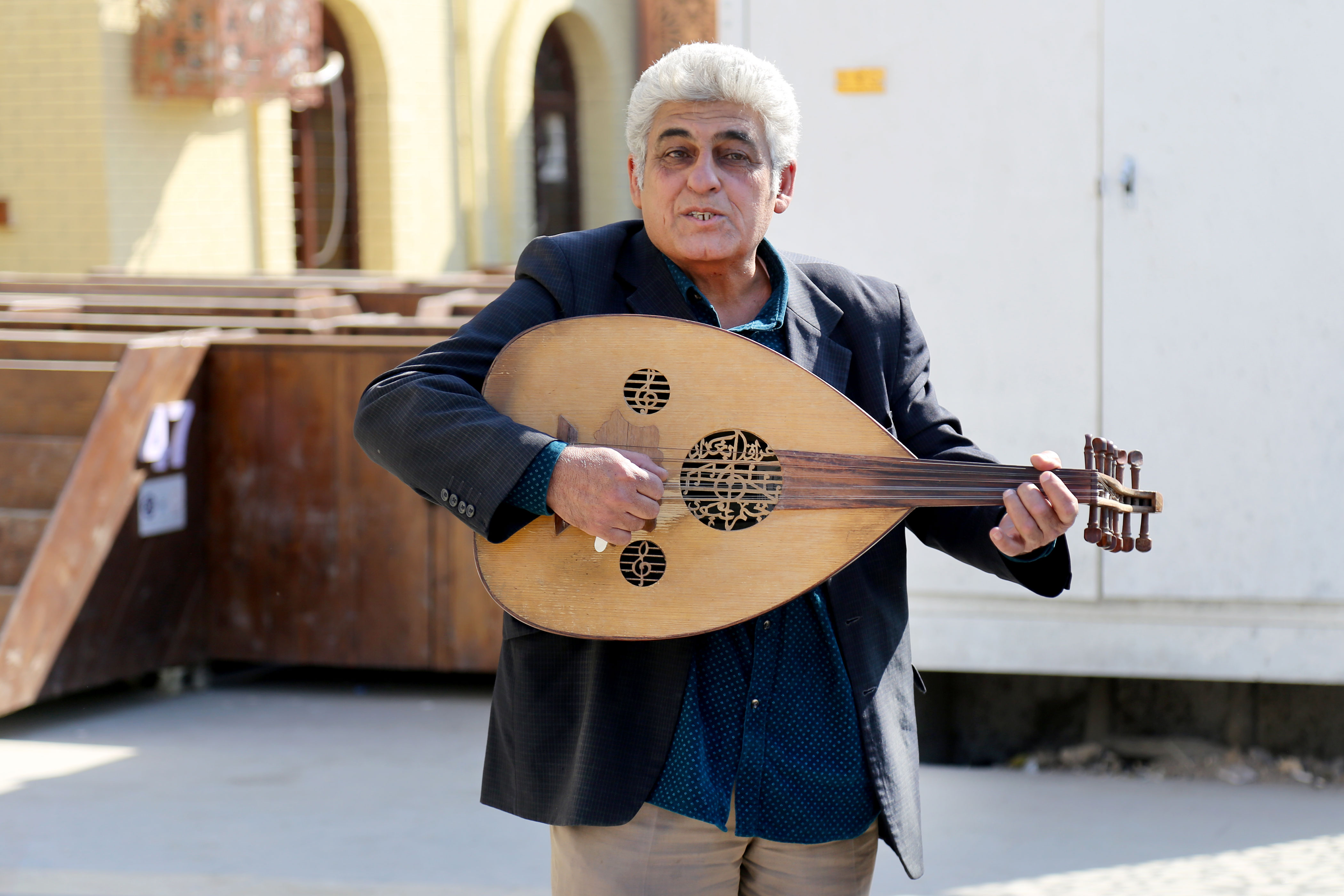
A singer in the street.

== See also ==
- Culture of Iraq
- Café Culture of Baghdad
- Al-Rasheed Street
- Shabandar Café
