= Nazım Pasha =

Ottoman Pasha (1848 – 1913)

Hüseyin Nâzım Pasha
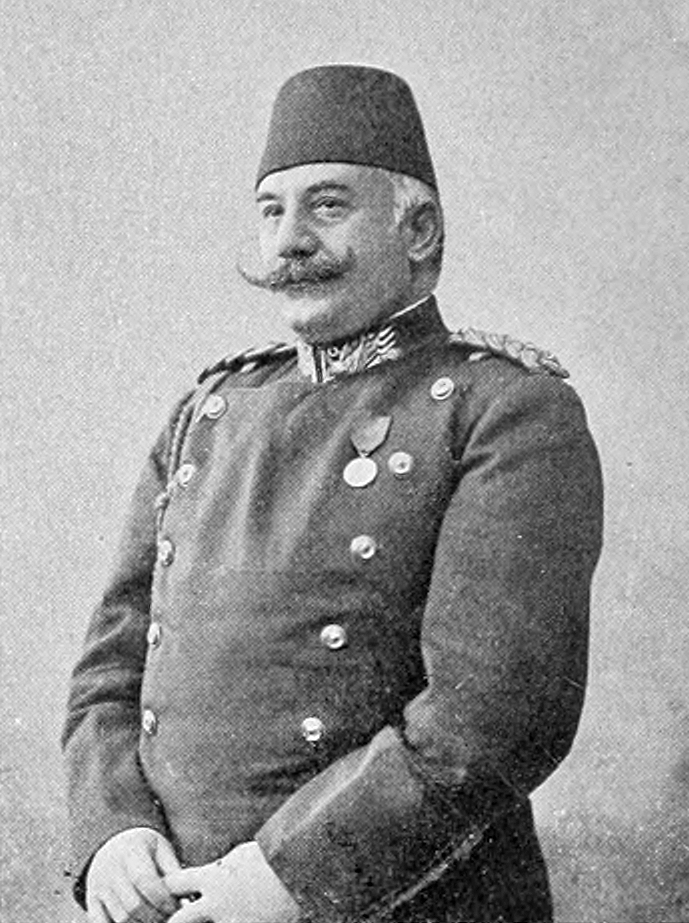
- Nazim Pasha in his military uniform
- Born: c. 1848; Istanbul, Ottoman Empire
- Died: 23 January 1913 (aged 65); Istanbul, Ottoman Empire
- Spouse: Zahide Selma Hanım (Ali Pasha's daughter)
- Children: Ali Bey, Azra, and Atiye Hanım
- Military career
- Allegiance: Ottoman Empire
- Branch: Ottoman Army
- Service years: 1872–1913
- Rank: Birinci ferik (General)
- Commands: First Army; Second Army
- Conflicts: Russo-Turkish War (1877–1878); First Balkan War; Bulgarian Front; 1913 Ottoman coup d'état X
- Awards: Order of the Medjidie; Order of Osmanieh; Liakat Medal; Imtiaz Medal

Hüseyin Nâzım Pasha (Turkish: Hüseyin Nazım Paşa; c. 1848 – 23 January 1913) was an Ottoman Turkish general, who was the Chief of Staff of the Ottoman Army during the First Balkan War of 1912–13. He was murdered by Yakub Cemil during the 1913 Ottoman coup d'état.

== Biography ==
=== Governor of Baghdad ===
In 1910, Nazım Pasha was chosen to become the governor of Baghdad and became well known for his many projects to rehabilitate the city. Due to this, he was given the Iraqi laqab "Midhat Pasha II" in reference to Midhat Pasha, who was considered the most progressive Ottoman Pasha to rule over Baghdad. Nazım Pasha gained a positive reputation in Iraq as an ambitious reformist leader, since Baghdad was extremely neglected during the Ottoman period.

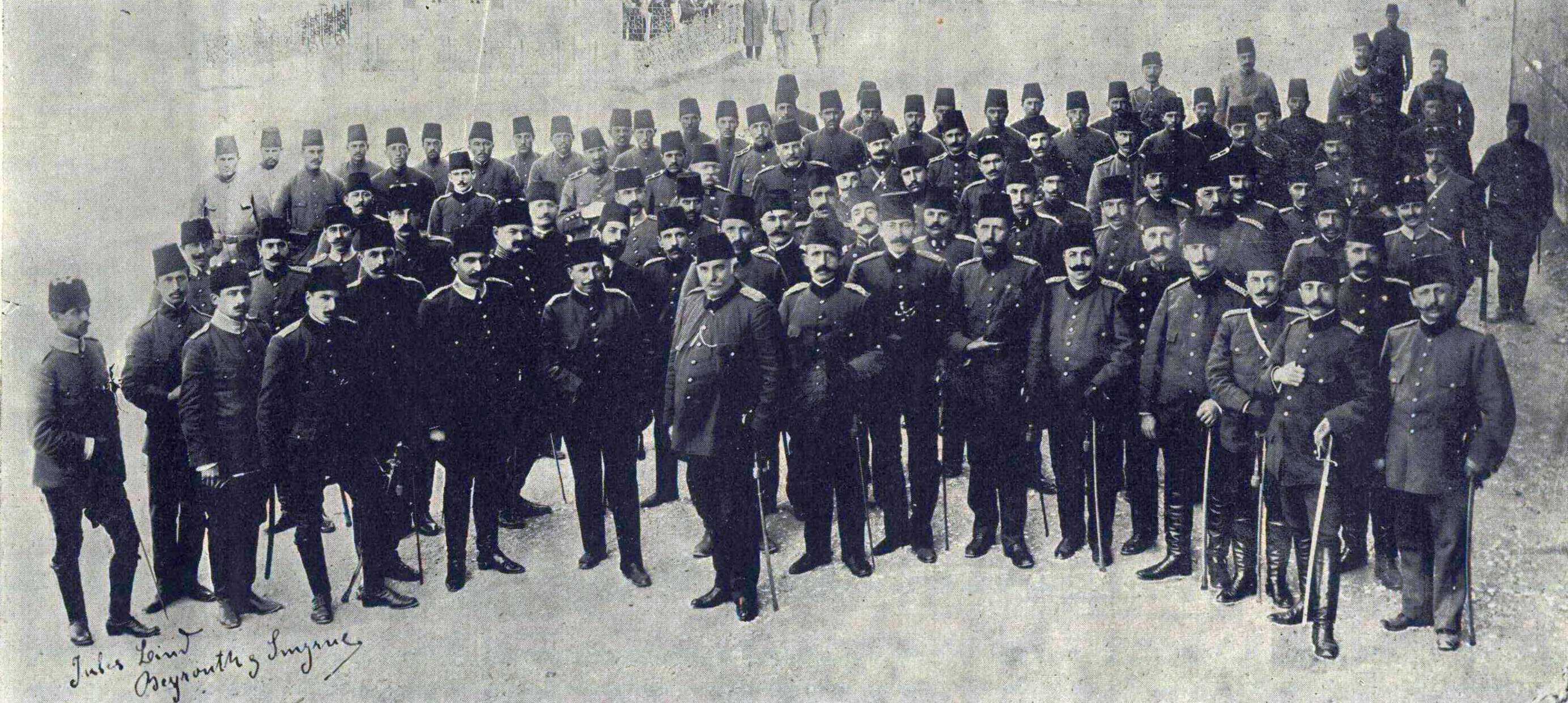
A photo from the Servet-i Fünun magazine, dated April 22, 1910, from the time when Nazım Pasha was the Governor of Baghdad.

Among Nazım Pasha's achievements were establishing the first modern road in Baghdad which became known as "al-Nahr Street", cleaning Baghdad's passageways and roads, releasing stray dogs back into the wild, paying Ottoman military officers in Baghdad who used to raid Baghdadi Souks due to lack of working salary, establishing a dam on the Tigris River, and organizing rules during Ramadan. Ottoman officers monitored the souks to ensure no one would eat during the day. Those who were arrested received ten lashes and a one-month prison sentence.

Nazım Pasha also established the first modern school in Baghdad called "Al-Huquq School" which was located on Zuqaq al-Sarai. Due to Nazım's establishment of education, jurists under the Pasha issued fatwas against Arab Bedouin tribe conflicts and raids. Trenches were dug around Baghdad to keep the city safe from raids. Nazım Pasha would also establish a trading center where many companies and the Ottoman Bank worked. Nazım Pasha eventually moved out of Baghdad and his position was taken over by Djemal Pasha.

=== Army career ===
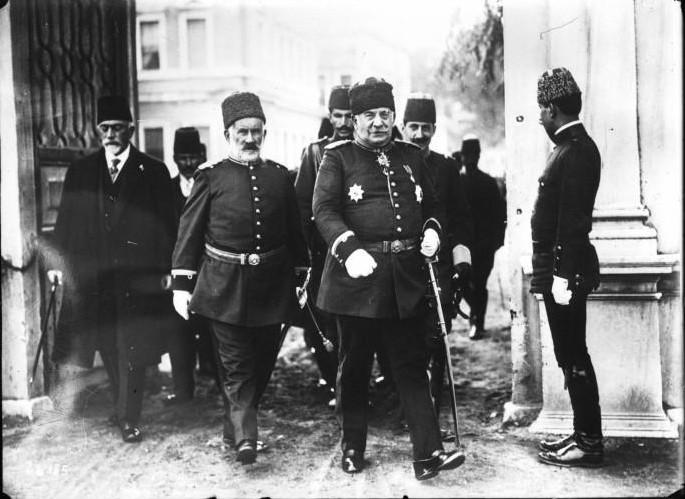
Nazım Pasha as the Chief of Staff during the First Balkan War.

Nazım was a staunch supporter of the French Offensive Doctrine, developed primarily by Ferdinand Foch, his instructor at the Saint-Cyr Military Academy and later supreme commander of Allied forces on the Western Front of World War I. Following his appointment as Chief of Staff, Nazım Pasha made immediate changes to Ottoman military doctrine which had been created by Colmar Freiherr von der Goltz (Goltz Pasha), the German officer who had been in charge of the reorganization and training of the Ottoman Army. Goltz Pasha's doctrine dictated that, in case of war with Balkan states, Ottoman forces would remain on the defensive, both on the western (Vardar) and eastern (Thracian) approaches.

Nazım Pasha abandoned Goltz Pasha's defensive (and probably realistic) doctrine and, though the Ottoman army had severe problems in mobilizing its troops (assembling fewer than half of the expected 600,000 troops), developed a bold offensive plan, including offensive operations on both fronts. Because the Serbian army was, after its defeat in the Serbo-Bulgarian War, considered a weaker opponent even by Western observers, Nazım Pasha planned to attack it first and render it operationally incapable. Nazım Pasha would then attack Bulgaria (considered the strongest link in the Balkan alliance) from both the Macedonian and Thracian directions. His underestimation of Serbian strength led to the complete failure of his operational plan and the catastrophe that followed.

=== Death ===
Nazım Pasha was assassinated by the Committee of Union and Progress on 23 January 1913 during the 1913 Ottoman coup d'état. The assassination came as a shock to the capitals of the world. The assassin, a young Ottoman-Circassian infantryman named Yakub Cemil who was a member of the party, was later arrested in 1916 after his plot to overthrow the government was discovered. Cemil was executed on 11 September 1916.

In retaliation, one of his relatives avenged his death by assassinating the CUP's Grand Vizier, Mahmud Shevket Pasha, on 11 June 1913.

== Personal life ==
Nazım Pasha was married to Zahide Selma Hanım, a daughter of Âli Pasha.

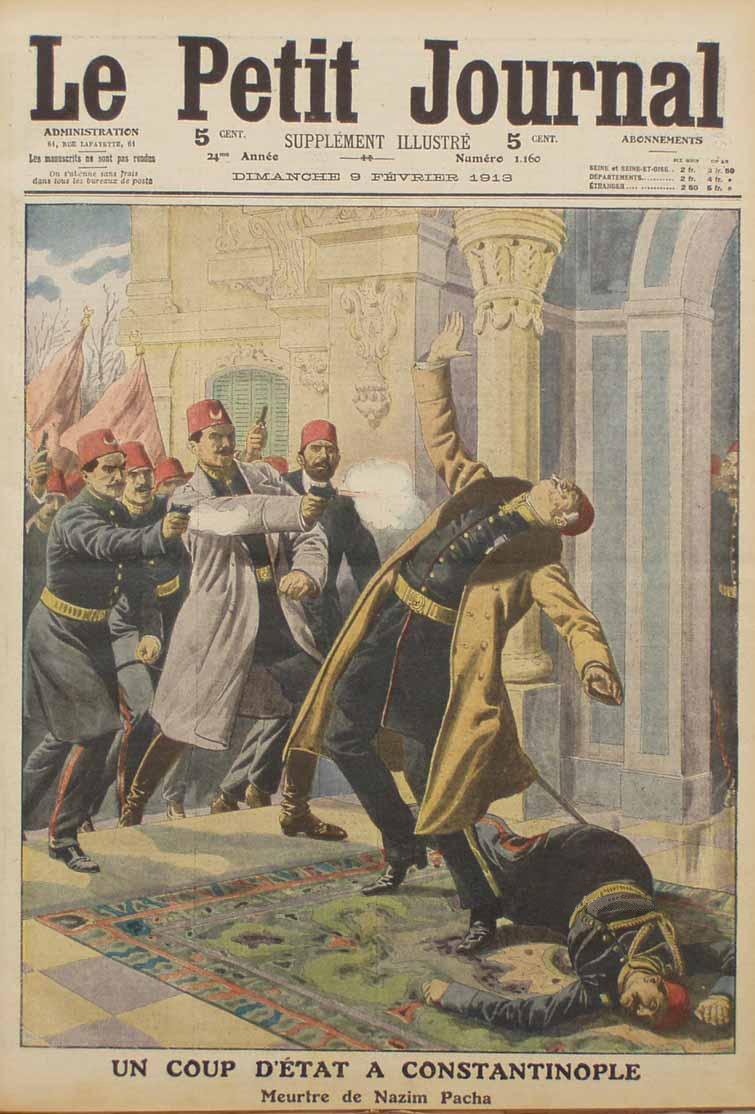
The front page of the Le Petit Journal magazine in February 1913 depicting the assassination of Nazım Pasha during the 1913 Ottoman coup d'état.

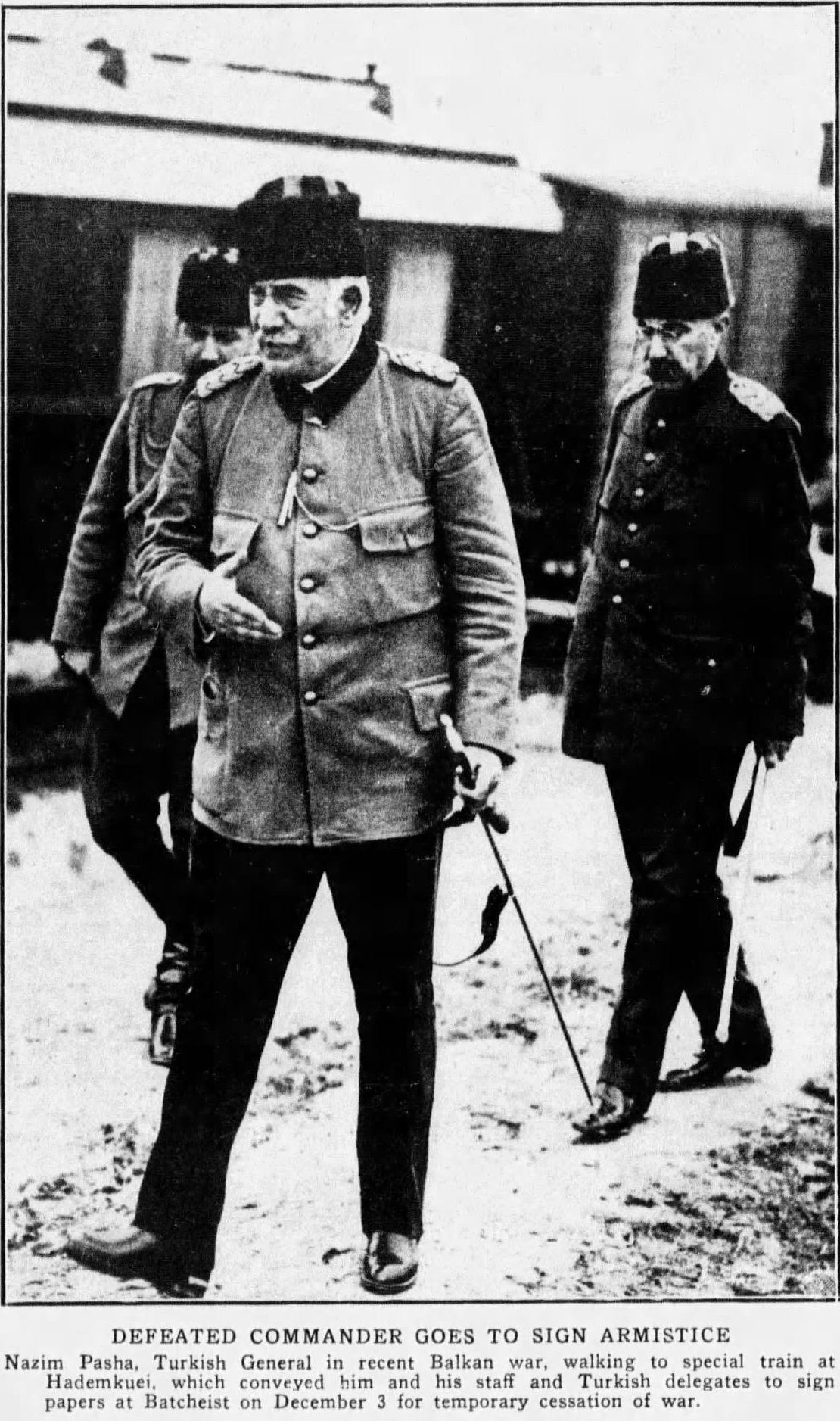
Nazım Pasha, one month before his assassination, on his way to sign Armistice
