= Al-Sarai Mosque =

Sunni mosque in Baghdad, Iraq

- جامع السراي
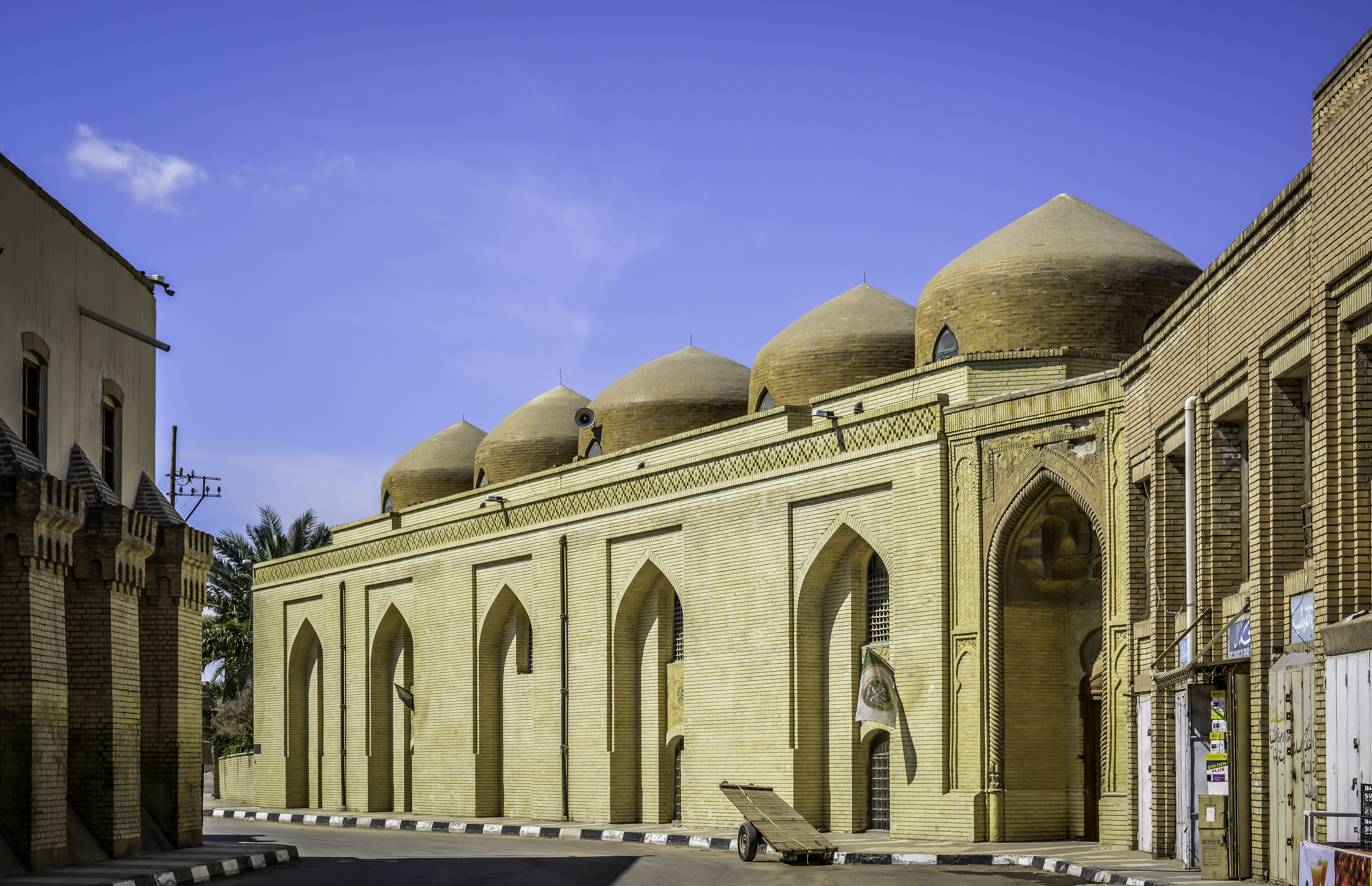
- The mosque in 2015

- Location in Baghdad

Religion
- Affiliation: Sunni Islam
- Ecclesiastical or organisational status: Mosque and madrasa
- Status: Active

Location
- Location: Rusafa, Baghdad, Baghdad Governorate
- Country: Iraq
- Interactive map of Al-Sarai Mosque
- Coordinates: 33°20′30″N 44°23′12″E

Architecture
- Type: Mosque architecture
- Style: Abbasid
- Founder: Al-Nasir
- Groundbreaking: 1193 CE

Specifications
- Capacity: 300 worshippers
- Interior area: 3,000 m^{2} (32,000 sq ft)
- Dome: Eleven
- Minaret: One

The Al-Sarai Mosque (Arabic: جامع السراي), also known as Hassan Pasha Mosque or Al-Nasr li-Din Allah Mosque, is a Sunni mosque located in the Rusafa district of Baghdad, in the Baghdad Governorate of Iraq, on Zuqaq al-Sarai. The mosque was said to be first laid by 34th Abbasid Caliph al-Nasir in 1193 CE. The mosque was also nicknamed "King Ghazi Mosque" because it was where the old Iraqi Kings prayed during the Royal Era.

== History ==
The mosque was first built according to the vision of Abbasid Caliph al-Nasir in an area called "Souq al-Sultan locality" which was close to Bab al-Sultan (now called Bab al-Muazzam). The mosque was mentioned by Islamic historian Sibt ibn al-Jawzi in his writings. In the year following the death of Caliph al-Nasir, his son, al-Zahir, succeeded the title of Caliph and built a library in the mosque as well as transferring many Qur'ans in the mosque. The mosque continued to play an important role even after the Mongol siege of Baghdad and evidence of this can be found in Ibn al-Fuwati's work where he mentioned that he was an Imam at the mosque at one point.

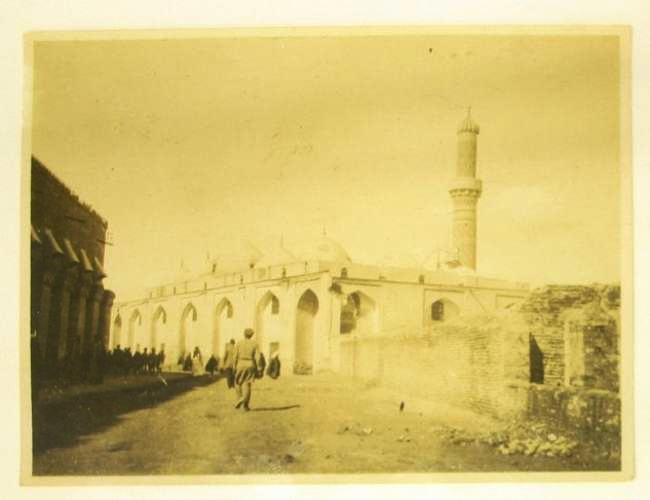
The mosque during World War I.

After the Ottoman conquest of Baghdad, Sultan Suleiman the Magnificent carried out a reconstruction of the mosque in 1533. In 1683, Ottoman Grand Vizier Ibrahim Pasha carried out a second reconstruction of the mosque as well as the Syed Sultan Ali Mosque. A century later between 1704 and 1723, Hassan Pasha, Governor of the Baghdad at the time and founder of the Mamluk state of Iraq, reconstructed the mosque in its current wide form and was named the "New Hassan Pasha Mosque" in his honor. The mosque at this time was also located opposite of the Baghdadi government palace. It was one of the most well-known mosques in al-Rusafa and included a madrasa as well as slender domes and a lofty minaret.

After the independence of the Kingdom of Iraq, several minor changes and reconstructions took place including that one of its doors leading to the alley behind it was closed, and that the teaching department that was in it was abolished. During the era of King Faisal I, the mosque became the main center of Friday Prayers in which the King would lead the prayers in typical Arab clothes and then talk and meet with the people there after.

Today, the mosque is located near al-Qushla and the mosque was at one point called the "King’s Mosque" because all the kings of Iraq prayed in it during the royal era. In 2024, the mosque was renewed and preserved alongside many historical buildings in Zuqaq al-Sarai.

== Description ==
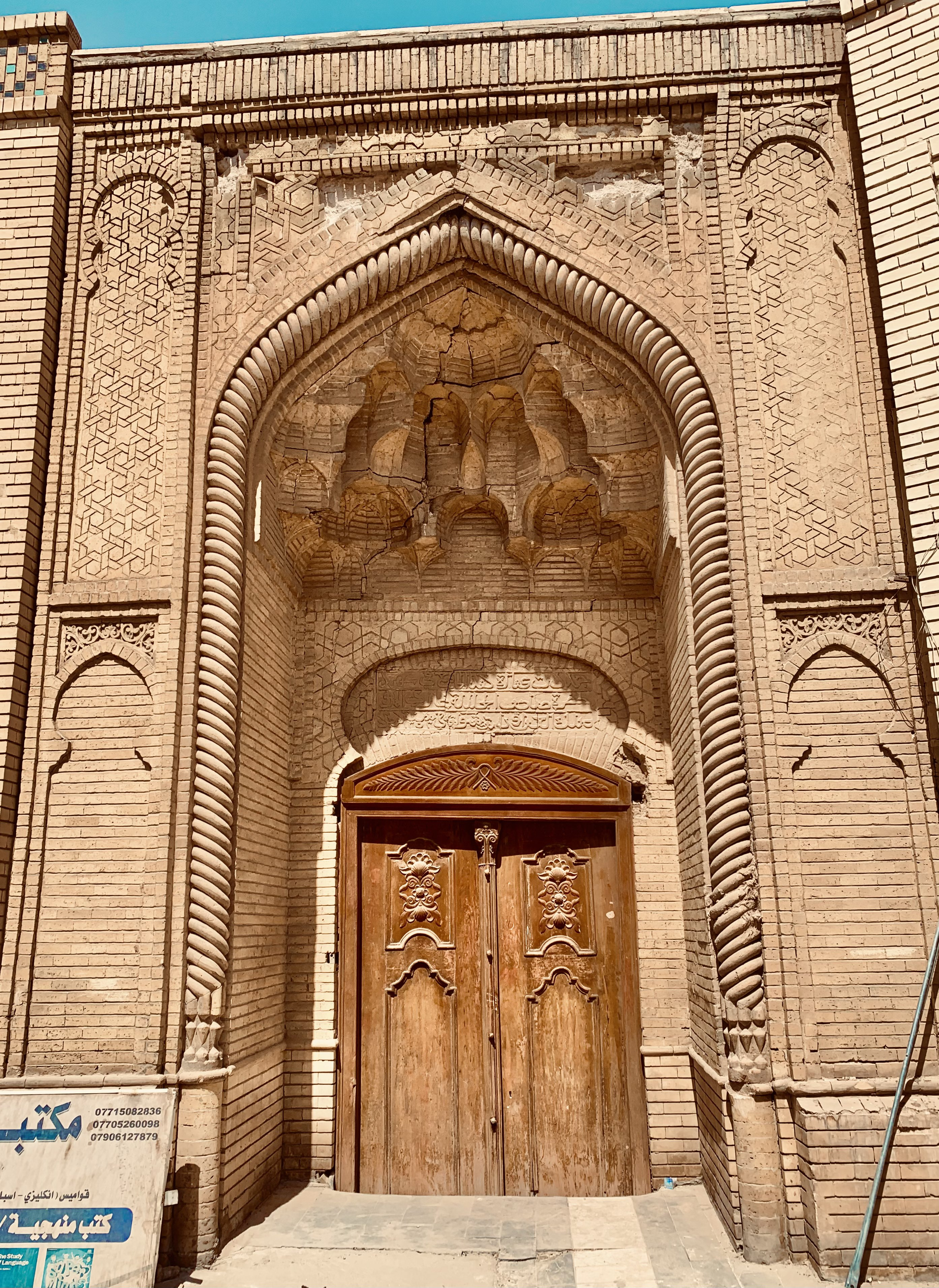
The gate.

=== Layout ===
The mosque is situated in front of Dar Diwani al-Hakumiyya, an administrative building during the Ottoman era, also known as a part of al-Qushla. Hassan Pasha, the wazir of Baghdad during the Ottoman era had overseen the expansion project during his office, and addition of several new facilities and features. During this time, ten additional domes, four central pillars in which there was no decorations or inscriptions, and a minaret with Qashani tiles were also added. The mosque's area is approximately 3,000 square metres (32,000 sq ft), and it can accommodate 300 worshipers.

=== Interior and gates ===
Within the courtyard, there is a musalla (prayer space) for summer time, and at the left side there is a musalla for winter time. Within the mosque there is also a madrasa. There are five gates to the mosque, which all of them lead to the prayer space for congregational prayers such as Friday prayers and eid prayers.

== See also ==
- Haydar-Khana Mosque
- Islam in Iraq
- List of mosques in Baghdad
