= Bilbul =

Bilbul may refer to:

- Bilbul or bulbul, a member of the songbird family Pycnonotidae
- Bilbul, New South Wales, a village ten kilometres from Griffith
- Ya'qub Bilbul (1920–2003), an Iraqi-born Israeli Jewish writer who wrote in Arabic even after moving to Israel
- Pilpul, a method of studying the Talmud
