= 1969 Baghdad hangings =

Public hangings of 14 alleged Israeli spies in Iraq

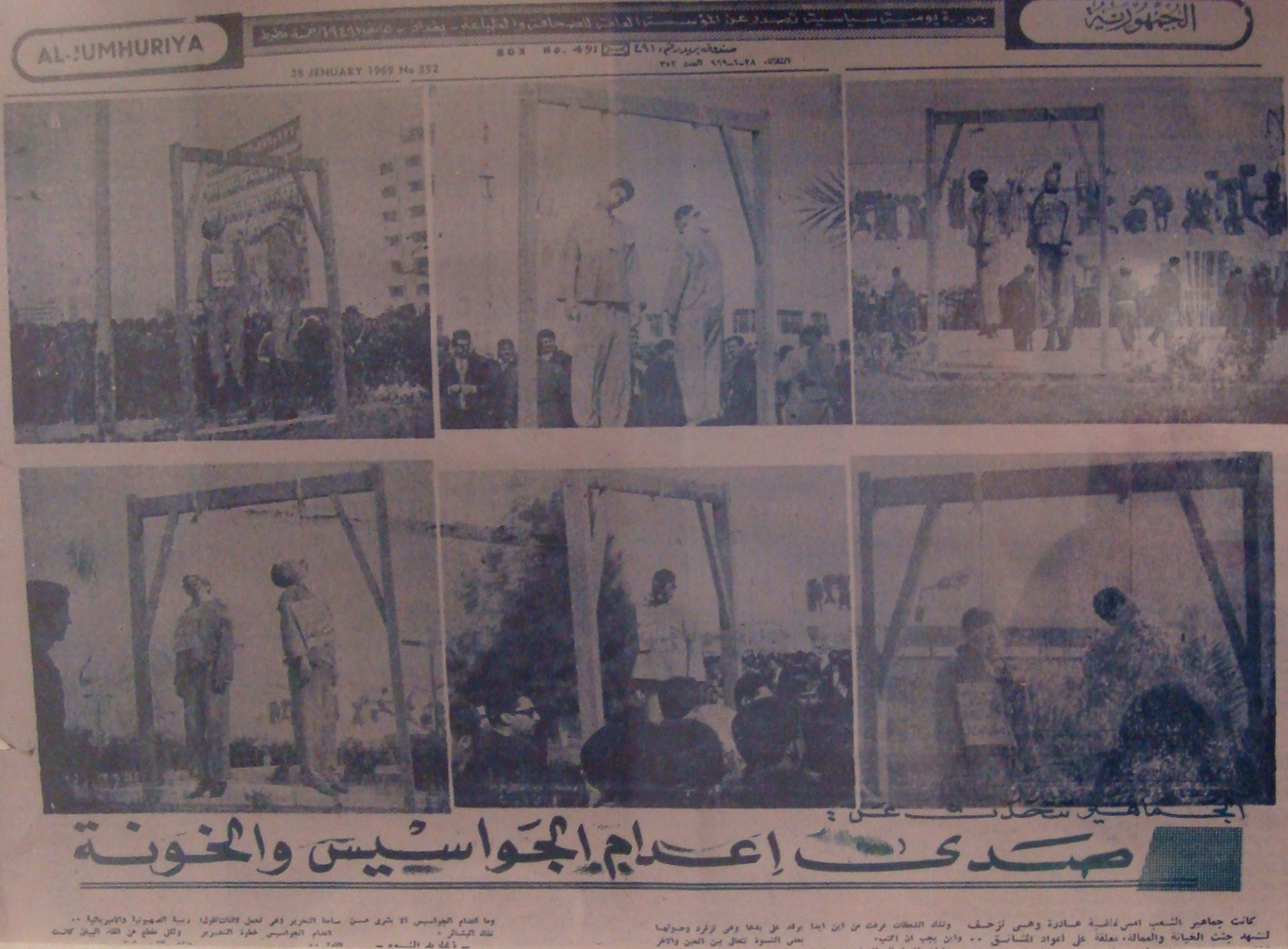
- Front-page photos of the hangings published in Al-Jumhuriya
- Location: Baghdad, Iraq
- Date: 27 January 1969
- Attack type: Mass hanging
- Victims: 14 dead
- Perpetrator: Arab Socialist Ba'ath Party

On 27 January 1969, Iraqi authorities hanged 14 Iraqis for allegedly spying for Israel during a public execution in Baghdad; nine were Jewish, three were Muslim and two were Christian.

== Background ==
The lopsided defeat suffered by the Arab states, including Iraq, against Israel in the June 1967 Six-Day War further increased discrimination against Iraq's remaining Jews: "They were dismissed from government jobs, their bank accounts were frozen and they were confined to house arrest, among other restrictions."

In July 1968, the Arab Socialist Ba'ath Party took control of Iraq in a bloodless coup. The new government was weak and was in constant fear that it would itself be the target of a coup. After the Israeli Air Force struck an Iraqi military position in northern Jordan on 4 December 1968 in retaliation for the shelling of Israeli communities in the Galilee, the Ba'athist regime began "hunting down an American-Israeli spy ring it said was trying to destabilize Iraq." The authorities began arresting alleged conspirators shortly thereafter, including twelve Jewish men from Baghdad and Basra.

By 1969, Iraq's Jewish community had shrunk from more than 130,000 in 1948 to less than 3,000 due to mass emigration caused by the establishment of the State of Israel, the subsequent Arab-Israeli wars, and anti-Jewish persecution.

== Hangings ==
Baghdad Radio invited citizens to Liberation Square on January 27 to "come and enjoy the feast", being brought in on buses. 500,000 people reportedly attended the hangings, and danced and celebrated before the corpses of the convicted spies.

Nine of the fourteen hanged were from the Iraqi Jewish community, three from the Muslim community and two from Christian communities. Three other members of the Iraqi Jewish community that were arrested at the same time were executed seven months later, on 26 August 1969.

=== Victims ===
Hakham Salman Debi, cantor of the Meir Taweig Synagogue, recorded the name of the victims of the hangings in a handwritten list, which was appended to a Jewish prayer book. This prayer book, along with the attached pages, is currently kept by the library of the Babylonian Jewry Heritage Center. The names of the victims were:

==== Jewish ====
- Ezra Naji Zilkha (51 years old)
- Na’im Khedhouri Hilali (19)
- Daoud Heskel Dalal (16)
- Hesqal Saleh Hesqel (17)
- Sabah Haim Dayan (30)
- Daoud Ghali Yadgar (23)
- Yaqoub Gourji Namerdi (38)
- Fouad Gabbay (30)
- Charles Rafael Horesh (44)

==== Muslim ====
- Jamal Sabih al-Hakim (17, and with a Jewish father and Muslim mother)
- Abdul Mohsin Jarallah
- Muhammad Abdul Hussain Nur Gita

==== Christian ====
- Zaki Andraus Zitou
- Albert Habib Thomas

== Aftermath ==
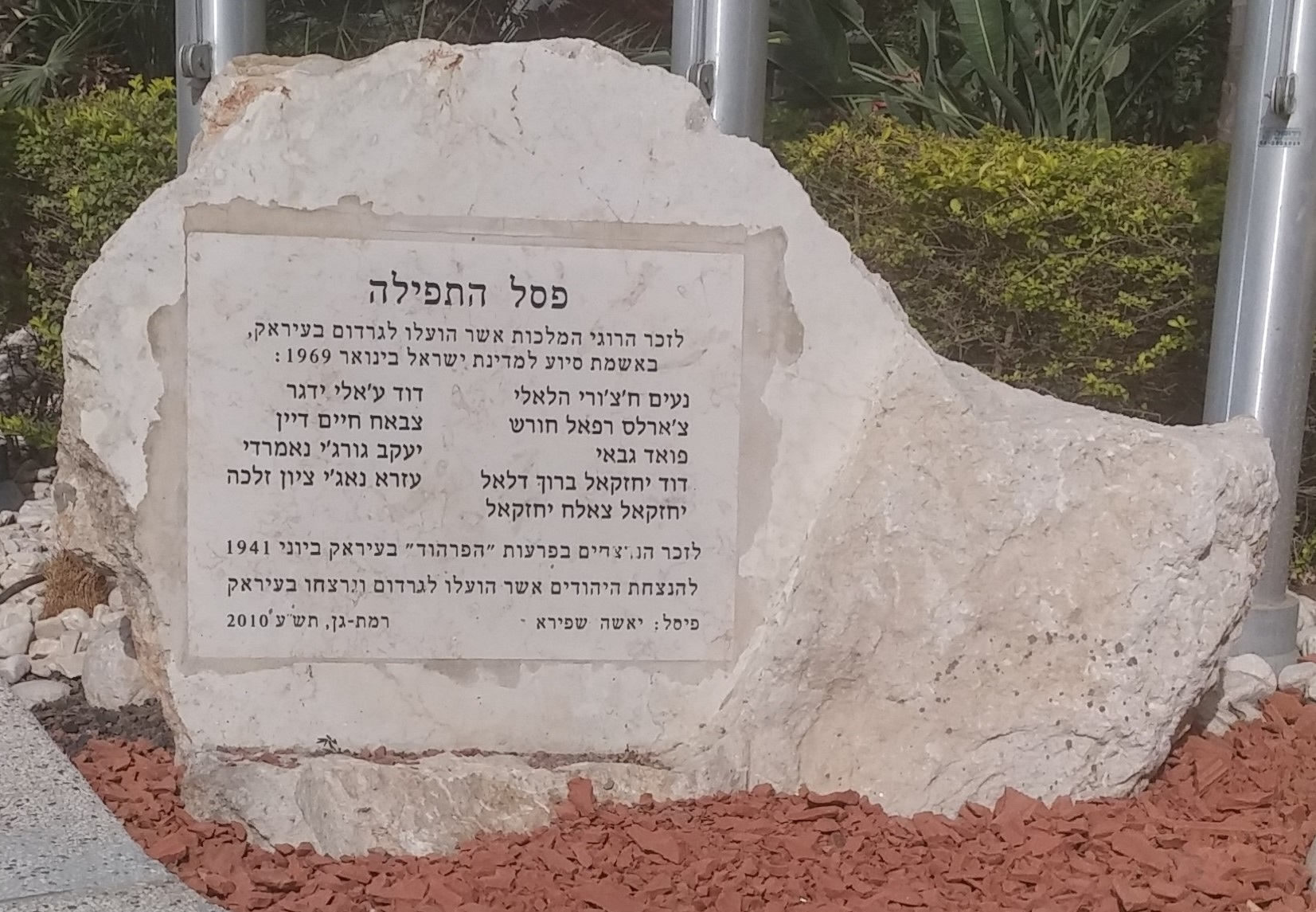
Memorial in Ramat Gan, Israel dedicated to the Iraqi Jews killed in the 1941 Farhud and in the 1969 hangings

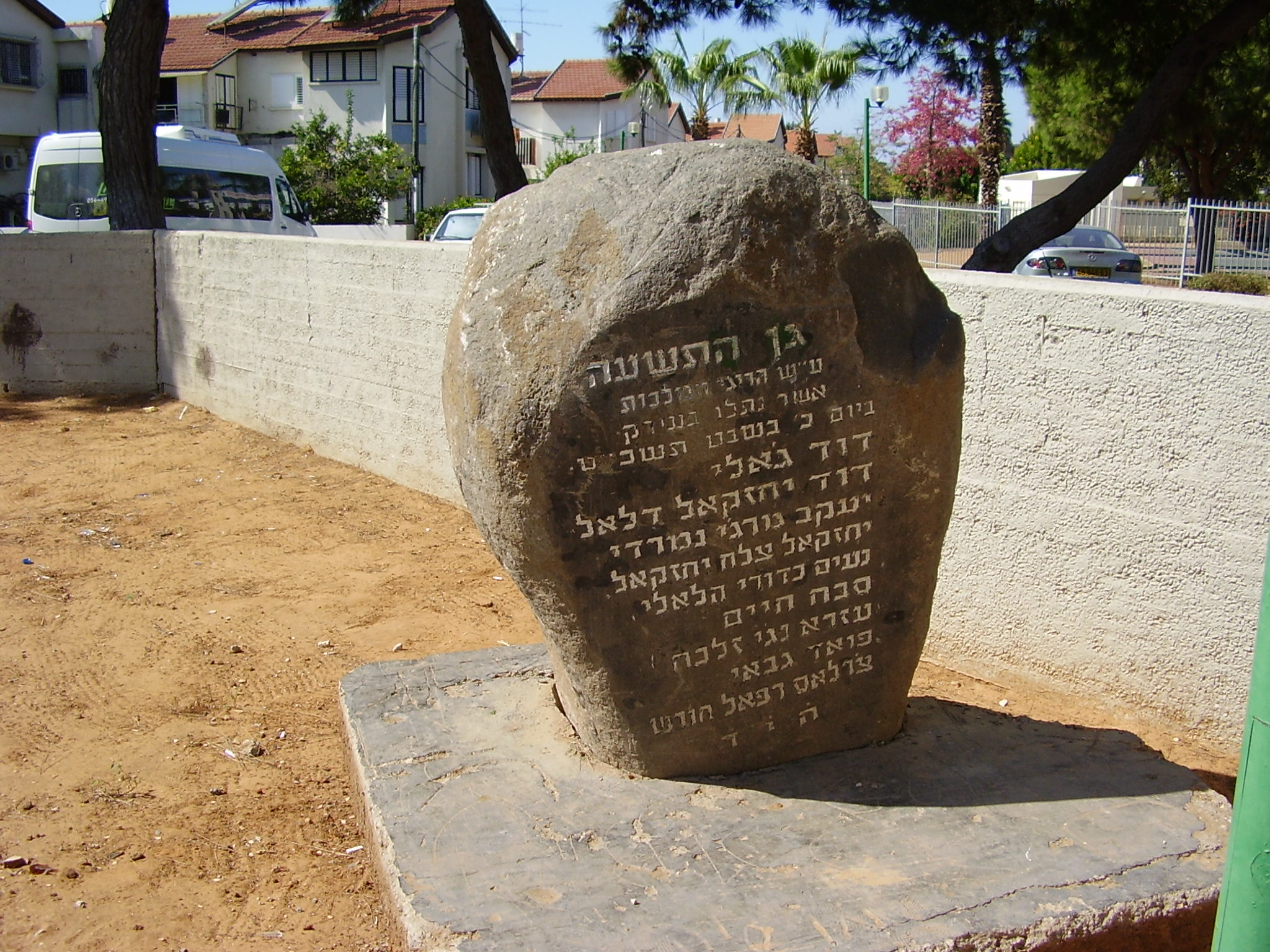
Memorial in Or Yehuda, Israel dedicated to the 9 Jews executed in the 1969 Baghdad hangings

The executions led to significant international criticism,with United States Secretary of State William P. Rogers condemning Iraq's actions as "repugnant to the conscience of the world" and Egypt's Al-Ahram cautioning: "The hanging of fourteen people in the public square is certainly not a heart-warming sight, nor is it the occasion for organizing a spectacle." By contrast, the Soviet Union's official radio called the executions "fully justified," while Charles de Gaulle of France said they could not be divorced from the broader Arab–Israeli conflict. Baghdad Radio rebutted Iraq's critics: "We hanged spies, but the Jews crucified Christ." According to author Kanan Makiya, the negative publicity "has less to do with the activities of a Zionist lobby as the Ba'ath claimed, as much as it was the outcome of the deliberately public nature of the proceedings. Later the Ba'ath learnt the art of sealing out the outside world." The persecution of Iraq's Jews continued after the spy trials: "By the time of the August executions, 51 Jews had been killed by the regime in 1969 alone; 100 more were imprisoned or tortured." In the early 1970s, nearly all of Iraq's Jewish population left after being permitted to leave. Only a small number stayed behind, largely those who were too old to travel.

Makiya credits the hangings with helping the Ba'athist government consolidate control of Iraq, stating: "The terror that, from a Ba'athist viewpoint, was premature and badly handled in 1963, worked and was skillfully deployed the second time around."

The story of the hangings has been told in fiction in Mona Yahia's novel When the Grey Beetles Took Over Baghdad, in Max Sawdayee's account All Waiting to be Hanged and in the memoir Chopping Onions on my Heart or Always Carry Salt by Samantha Ellis whose mother's cousin was one of the victims.

== See also ==
- List of massacres in Iraq
