= History of the Jews in Iraq =

Iraqi Jews
يهود العراق; יְהוּדִים בָּבְלִים; אליהוד אלעראקיון
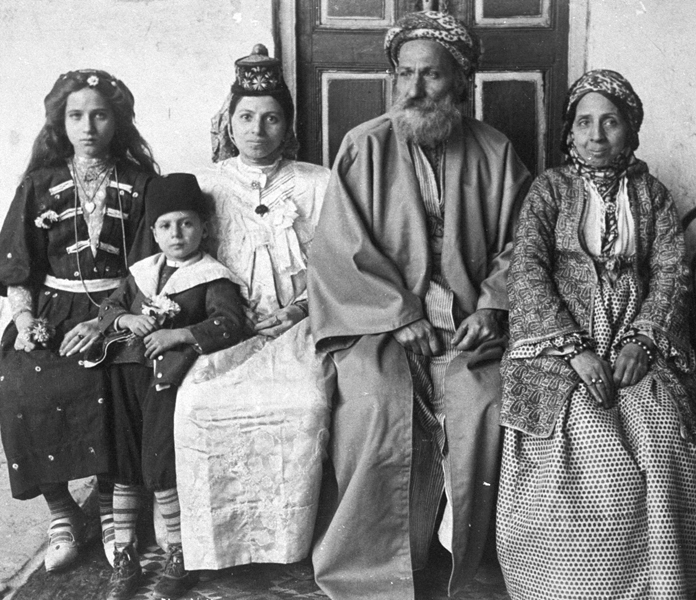
- Rabbi Ezra Dangoor with his family in Baghdad, 1910

Regions with significant populations
- Israel: 450,000
- United States: 15,000
- United Kingdom: 10,000
- Iraq: 5 (2025)

Languages
- Historic: Hebrew, Jewish Babylonian Aramaic; Traditional: Eastern Judeo-Aramaic, Judeo-Iraqi Arabic

Religion
- Judaism

Related ethnic groups
- Assyrian Jews, Iranian Jews, Bukharian Jews, Mountain Jews, Georgian Jews, Mizrahi Jews

The history of the Jews in Iraq is documented from the time of the Assyrian captivity in the 8th century BCE and Babylonian captivity (c. 586 BCE). Iraqi Jews (al-Yahūd al-ʿIrāqiyyūn), also known as Bavlim (Hebrew: יְהוּדִים בָּבְלִים, Yəhūḏīm Bāḇəlīm, lit. 'Babylonian Jews'), constitute one of the world's oldest and most historically significant Jewish communities.

The Jewish community in Mesopotamia, known in Jewish sources as "Babylonia", traces its origins to the early sixth century BCE, when a large number of Judeans from the defeated Kingdom of Judah were exiled to Babylon in several waves by the Neo-Babylonian Empire. The Jewish community of Babylonia rose to prominence as the center of Jewish scholarship following the decline of the Jewish population in the Land of Israel in the 3rd century CE. Estimates often place the Babylonian Jewish population of the third to seventh centuries at around one million, making it the largest Jewish diaspora community of that period. The area became home to many important Talmudic yeshivas such as the Nehardea, Pumbedita and Sura Academies, and the Babylonian Talmud was compiled there. The Mongol invasion and Islamic discrimination under the caliphates in the Middle Ages eventually led to the decline of the region's Jewish community. Under the Ottoman Empire, the Jews of Ottoman Iraq fared better. The community established modern schools in the second half of the 19th century. Driven by persecution, which saw many of the leading Jewish families of Baghdad flee for India, and expanding trade with British colonies, the Jews of Iraq established a trading diaspora in Asia known as the Baghdadi Jews.

The Iraqi Jewish community formed a homogeneous group, maintaining communal Jewish identity, culture and traditions. The Jews in Iraq distinguished themselves by the way they spoke in Baghdadi Judeo-Arabic, also known as Judeo-Iraqi Arabic; the way they dressed; observation of Jewish rituals, for example, the Sabbath and holidays; and kashrut. In the 20th century, Iraqi Jews played an important role in the early days of Iraq's independence. According to Avi Shlaim and to Marina Benjamin, they were deeply integrated into the wider Iraqi society, culturally and linguistically. At the beginning of the 20th century Jews formed a notable presence in the country's main cities, including up to 40% in Baghdad and 25% in Basra. In 1941, the Farhud ("violent dispossession"), a major pogrom, occurred in Baghdad, in which 200 Jews or more were murdered. The Jews of Baghdad were persecuted and murdered by the Al-Futwa, an Iraqui Muslim youth terror group, based on the Nazi Hitler Youth in Germany. The Al-Futwa marked Jewish Homes and businesses with red paint, a sign that was first used in Germany as a sign that the slaughter of Jews was imminent. Following the 1948 Arab–Israeli War, persecution against Jews culminated in increased government oppression and cultural discrimination. The government, while maintaining a public policy of discrimination against Jews, simultaneously forbade Jews from emigrating to Israel out of concern for strengthening the nascent Israeli state. In 1950, the government reversed course and permitted Jews to emigrate in exchange for renouncing their citizenship. From 1950 to 1952, nearly the entire Iraqi Jewish population was driven from Iraq to Israel . The Israeli programs to assist the emigration were known as Operations Ezra and Nehemiah. Historians estimate that 120,000–130,000 Iraqi Jews (around 75% of the entire community) reached Israel.

Under the Ba'ath Party, Jews were detained, imprisoned, tortured, and even executed on charges of spying for Israel. Under Saddam Hussein's rule, Jews were forbidden to leave Iraq and many escaped Though, under later amendments by Saddam, situation of remaining Jews improved.

The remainder of the Jewish population continued to dwindle in the ensuing decades; as of 2014, the total number of Jews living in Iraq numbered around 500, mostly in Baghdad and Kurdistan region. The religious and cultural traditions of Iraqi Jews are kept alive today in strong communities established by Iraqi Jews in Israel, especially in Or Yehuda, Givatayim and Kiryat Gat. According to government data as of 2014, there were 227,900 Jews of Iraqi descent in Israel, with other estimates as high as 600,000 Israelis having some Iraqi ancestry. Smaller communities upholding Iraqi Jewish traditions in the Jewish diaspora exist in the United Kingdom, Ireland, Australia, Singapore, Canada, and the United States.

== "Babylonia" ==
What Jewish sources called "Babylon" and "Babylonia" may refer to the ancient city of Babylon and the Neo-Babylonian Empire; or, very often, it means the specific area of Mesopotamia (the region between the Tigris and the Euphrates rivers) where a number of Jewish religious academies functioned during the Geonic period (6th–11th century CE).

In the Bible, Babylon and the country of Babylonia are not always clearly distinguished; in most cases, the same word is used in reference to both places. In some passages, the land of Babylonia is called Shinar, while in the post-exilic literature, it is called Chaldea. In the Book of Genesis, Babylonia is described as the land in which Babel, Erech, Accad, and Calneh are located – cities that are declared to have formed the beginning of Nimrod's kingdom. In the historical books, Babylonia is frequently referred to (there are no fewer than thirty-one allusions in the Books of Kings), though the lack of a clear distinction between the city and the country is sometimes puzzling.

== Biblical history ==
The Ten Israelite Tribes from the northern Kingdom of Israel were exiled to Assyria from 730 BCE. In the number and importance of its references to Babylonian life and history, the Book of Jeremiah stands preeminent in the Hebrew literature. With numerous important allusions to events in the reign of Nebuchadnezzar, Jeremiah has become a valuable source in reconstructing Babylonian history within recent times. The inscriptions of Nebuchadnezzar are almost exclusively devoted to building operations; and but for the Book of Jeremiah, little would be known of his campaign against Jerusalem.

During the 6th century BCE, the Jews of the ancient Kingdom of Judah were exiled to Babylon by Nebuchadnezzar in three waves. The first was in the time of Jehoiachin in 597 BCE, when, in retaliation for a refusal to pay tribute, the First Temple in Jerusalem was partially despoiled and a number of the leading citizens removed. After eleven years, in the reign of Zedekiah—who had been enthroned by Nebuchadnezzar—a fresh revolt of the Judaeans took place, perhaps encouraged by the close proximity of the Egyptian army. The city was razed to the ground, and a further deportation ensued. Five years later, Jeremiah records a third captivity. After the overthrow of Babylonia by the Persians, Cyrus gave the Jews permission to return to their native land (537 BCE), and more than forty thousand are said to have availed themselves of the privilege.

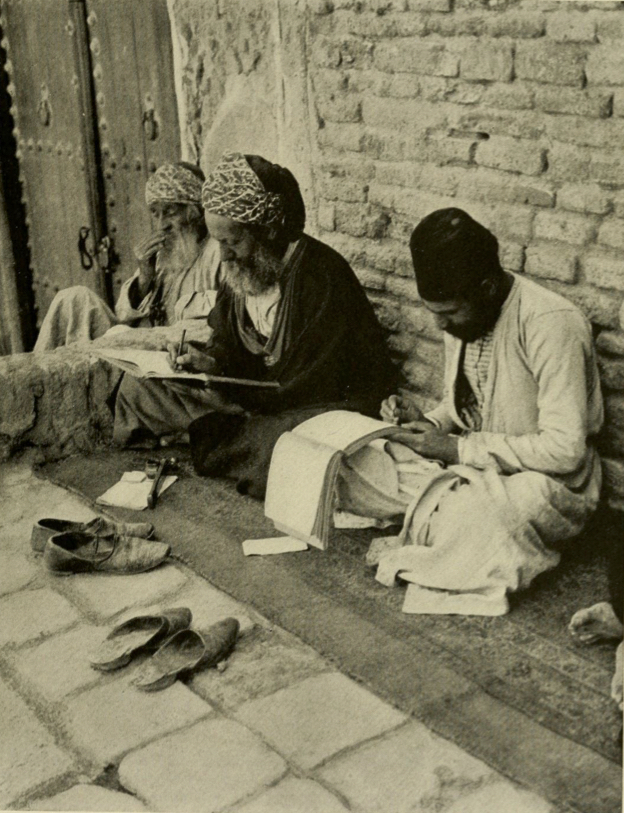
Jewish scribes at Ezekiel's Tomb, 1914

The earliest accounts of the Jews exiled to Babylonia are furnished only by scanty biblical details, although a number of archaeological discoveries (such as the Al-Yahudu Tablets) shed light into the social lives of the deportees; certain sources seek to supply this deficiency from the realms of legend and tradition. Thus, the so-called "Small Chronicle" (Seder Olam Zutta) endeavors to preserve historic continuity by providing a genealogy of the exilarchs ("Reshe Galuta") back to King Jeconiah. Jeconiah himself is made an exilarch.

The "Small Chronicle" states that Zerubbabel returned to Judea in the Greek period. Certainly, the descendants of the Davidic line occupied an exalted position among their brethren in Babylonia, as they did at that period in Judea. During the Maccabean revolt, these Judean descendants of the royal house had immigrated to Babylonia.

According to the biblical account, the Persian emperor Cyrus the Great was "God's anointed", having freed the Jews from Babylonian rule. After the conquest of Babylonia by the Persian Achaemenid Empire Cyrus granted all the Jews citizenship and by decree allowed the Jews to return to Israel (around 537 BCE). Subsequently, successive waves of Babylonian Jews emigrated to Israel. Ezra (fl. 480–440 BCE) returned from Babylonian exile and reintroduced the Torah in Jerusalem (Ezra 7–10 and Nehemiah 8).

During the Second Temple period two large Jewish communities developed in Mesopotamia: one in northern Mesopotamia who attributed their ancestry to the Ten Lost Tribes, and one in central Mesopotamia associated with the Judean exiles. The continuity of Jewish culture in Babylonia across the centuries is indicated by certain names which appear among Babylonian Jews in Ezra-Nehemiah and centuries later among Babylonian amoraim, but never in Judean sources, such as Shereviah.

== Hellenistic period ==
Information regarding the early period of Jewish history in Iraq is extremely limited. But with Alexander the Great's campaign, some accurate information concerning the Jews in the East reached the western world. Alexander's army contained numerous Jews who refused, from religious scruples, to take part in the reconstruction of the destroyed Belus temple in Babylon. The accession of Seleucus Nicator, 312 BCE, to whose extensive empire Babylonia belonged, was accepted by the Jews and Syrians for many centuries as the commencement of a new era for reckoning time, called the Seleucid era, or in Jewish sources "minyan sheṭarot" (era of contracts), which was also officially adopted by the Parthians. Nicator's foundation of a city, Seleucia, on the Tigris is mentioned by the Rabbis; both the "Large" and the "Small Chronicle" contain references to him.

The persecutions of Antiochus IV (168 BCE) appear to have been limited to Judea, and likely were not imposed on Babylonian Jews.

== Parthian period ==
Mithridates (174–136 BCE) subjugated, about the year 160, the province of Babylonia, and thus the Jews for four centuries came under Parthian domination.

Jewish sources contain no mention of Parthian influence; the very name "Parthian" does not occur, unless "Parthian" is meant by "Persian", which occurs now and then. The Armenian prince Sanatroces, of the royal house of the Arsacides, is mentioned in the "Small Chronicle" as one of the successors (diadochoi) of Alexander. Among other Asiatic princes, the Roman rescript in favor of the Jews reached Arsaces as well (I Macc. 15:22); it is not, however, specified which Arsaces.

Not long after this, the Partho-Babylonian country was trodden by the army of a Jewish prince. The Syrian king, Antiochus VII Sidetes, in company with Hyrcanus I, marched against the Parthians. When the allied armies defeated the Parthians (129 BCE) at the Great Zab (Lycus), the king ordered a halt of two days on account of the Jewish Sabbath and Feast of Weeks.

In 40 BCE the Jewish puppet-king, Hyrcanus II, fell into the hands of the Parthians, who, according to their custom, cut off his ears to render him unfit for rulership. The Jews of Babylonia, it seems, had the intention of founding a high-priesthood for the exiled Hyrcanus, which they would have made quite independent of Judea. But the reverse was to come about: the Judeans received a Babylonian, Ananel by name, as their high priest which indicates the importance enjoyed by the Jews of Babylonia. Philo speaks of the large number of Jews resident in that country, a population which was no doubt considerably swelled by new immigrants after the First Jewish-Roman War (66–73 CE).

How free a hand the Parthians permitted the Jews is perhaps best illustrated by the rise of the little Jewish robber-state in Nehardea (see Anilai and Asinai). Still more remarkable is the conversion of the king of Adiabene to Judaism. These instances show not only the tolerance, but the weakness of the Parthian kings. The Babylonian Jews wanted to fight in common cause with their Judean brethren against Vespasian; but it was not until Trajan's Parthian campaign that they made their hatred felt; so that it was in a great measure owing to the revolt of the Babylonian Jews that the Romans did not become masters of Babylonia too.

At the height of the war, Jerusalem and the Second Temple were destroyed. These events caused a wide dispersion of Jews in which many probably ended up in Babylonia. The Jews of Babylon would for the first time write prayers in a language other than Hebrew, such as the Kaddish, written in Judeo-Aramaic – a harbinger of the many languages in which Jewish prayers in the diaspora would come to be written in, such as Greek, Arabic, and Turkish.

Accustomed in Jerusalem from early times to look to the east for help, and aware, as the Roman procurator Petronius was, that the Jews of Babylon could render effectual assistance, Babylonia became with the fall of Jerusalem the very bulwark of Judaism. The collapse of the Bar Kochba revolt no doubt added to the number of Jewish refugees in Babylon.

In the continuous Roman–Persian Wars, the Jews had every reason to hate the Romans, the destroyers of their sanctuary, and to side with the Parthians, their protectors. Possibly it was recognition of services thus rendered by the Jews of Babylonia, and by the Davidic house especially, that induced the Parthian kings to elevate the princes of the Exile, who until then had been little more than mere collectors of revenue, to the dignity of real princes, called Resh Galuta. Thus, then, the numerous Jewish subjects were provided with a central authority which assured an undisturbed development of their own internal affairs.

In religious matters the Babylonians, like the whole diaspora, were in many regards dependent upon Judea. They went on pilgrimages to Jerusalem for the festivals, and were dependent on Judean authorities to fix the calendar. The early rabbis took for granted that their rulings would be followed in Babylonia as well as locally. That said, the influence was to some extent mutual: a number of early notable rabbis including Hillel the Elder, Nahum the Mede, and Nathan the Babylonian had ancestry in Babylonia or further east. In the 2nd century, Nisibis ("Netzivin") was such a center of rabbinic scholarship that figures like Eleazar ben Shammua could consider traveling there to study.

The Jews of northern Babylonia appear to have suffered severely from the Roman-Parthian and Roman-Sasanian wars; this, and possibly the growing power of Christianity in the area, appear to have led to a weakening of the Jewish community in northern Mesopotamia while the center of Jewish culture shifted to the center and south.

== Sasanian period ==
A new ruling family from an ancient dynasty of Iranian priests took control of the region around 223 CE and imposed a new system of government based on Zoroastrianism and local Iranian identity, which often suppressed dissident factions and heterodox views. It dominated the area until the Muslim conquest in the seventh century CE and became known as the Sasanian Empire. During the 3rd to 7th centuries, the Babylonian Jewish community is estimated to have reached about one million, potentially making it the largest Jewish diaspora population of the time and possibly surpassing the Jewish population in the Land of Israel during the same period. The Babylonian Talmud was written during this time and is a source of information for the political, religious, social, and linguistic facets of the empire. Under the Sasanians, Babylonia became the province of Asoristan, with its main city, Ctesiphon, becoming the capital of the Empire.

Although there were some tensions between the Jewish community and Zoroastrian priests who sought to unify the entire empire under one religion and were less tolerant than their forebears during the early Sasanian era, the Jewish community's stature and their religious and communal autonomy were generally maintained. The Jewish communities in Mesopotamia flourished, particularly in the fourth century CE, as a result of Shapur's tolerant rule and the Christianization of the Roman Empire, which led to a large Jewish migration from Roman-controlled territory into the only Roman-independent region, the Sasanian Empire. While occasionally there were disputes between Jews and the authorities, the Talmudic texts mainly show respect for the Sasanian government, and the Amora Samuel of Nehardea's remark – "dina demalchuta dina" (The law of the kingdom, the governing empire, must be upheld) reflects this attitude.

Shapur I (Shvor Malka, which is the Aramaic form of the name) was a friend to the Jews. His friendship with Shmuel gained many advantages for the Jewish community. Shapur II's mother was Jewish, and this gave the Jewish community a relative freedom of religion and many advantages. Shapur was also the friend of a Babylonian rabbi in the Talmud called Raba, and Raba's friendship with Shapur II enabled him to secure a relaxation of the oppressive laws enacted against the Jews in the Persian Empire. In addition, Raba sometimes referred to his top student Abaye with the term Shvur Malka meaning "Shapur [the] King" because of his bright and quick intellect.

Christians, Manicheans, Buddhists and Jews at first seemed at a disadvantage, especially under Sasanian high-priest Kartir; but the Jews, dwelling in more compact masses in cities like Isfahan, were not exposed to such general discrimination as broke out against the more isolated Christians.

=== Babylonian academies and the Babylonian Talmud ===
The Sasanian period witnessed the flourishing of Jewish culture in Babylonia, and the beginning of a long period in which Babylonian Jewry took the lead in Jewish culture worldwide. A landmark in this process was the emigration of Rav from the Galilee, where he had studied with Judah HaNasi (author of the Mishnah), to Babylonia in 219 CE. The Jewish community of Babylonia was already learned, but Rav focused and organised their study. Leaving an existing Babylonian academy at Nehardea for his colleague Samuel, Rav founded a new academy at Sura, where he and his family already owned property, and which was known as a Jewish city. Rav's move created an environment in which Babylon had two contemporary leading academies that competed with one another, yet were so far removed from one another that they could never interfere with each other's operations. Since Rav and Samuel were acknowledged peers in position and learning, their academies likewise were considered of equal rank and influence.

Their relationship can be compared to that between the Jerusalemite academies of the Houses of Hillel and Shammai, albeit Rav and Samuel agreed with each other far more often than did the houses of Hillel and Shammai. Thus, both Babylonian rabbinical schools opened a new era for diaspora Judaism, and the ensuing discussions in their classes furnished the earliest stratum and style of the scholarly material deposited in the Babylonian Talmud.

The key work of these semi-competing academies was the compilation of the Babylonian Talmud (the discussions from these two cities), completed by Rav Ashi and Ravina, two successive leaders of the Babylonian Jewish community, around the year 520, though rougher copies had already been circulated to the Jews of the Byzantine Empire. Editorial work by the Savoraim or Rabbanan Savoraei (post-Talmudic rabbis), continued on this text's grammar for the next 250 years; much of the text did not reach its "perfected" form until around 600–700. The Mishnah, which had been completed in the early 3rd century CE, and the Babylonian Gemara (the discussions at and around these academies) together form the Talmud Bavli (the "Babylonian Talmud"). Jewish tradition to this day overwhelmingly relies on the Babylonian Talmud, composed by Babylonian scholars during this period, rather than the Jerusalem Talmud composed in the same period in the Galilee.

The three centuries in the course of which the Babylonian Talmud was developed in the academies founded by Rav and Samuel were followed by five centuries during which it was intensely preserved, studied, expounded in the schools, and, through their influence, discipline and work, recognized by the whole diaspora. Sura, Nehardea, and Pumbedita were considered the seats of diaspora learning; and the heads of these authorities were referred to later on as Geonim and were considered the highest authorities on religious matters in the Jewish world. Their decisions were sought from all sides and were accepted wherever diaspora Jewish communal life existed. They even successfully competed against the learning coming from the Land of Israel itself. The periods of Jewish history immediately following the close of the Talmud are designated according to the titles of the teachers at Sura and Pumbedita: the Geonim and the Saboraim. The Saboraim were the scholars whose diligent hands completed the Talmud and the first great Talmudic commentaries in the first third of the 6th century.

The two academies among others, and the Jewish community they led, lasted until the middle of the 11th century. Pumbedita faded after its chief rabbi was murdered in 1038, and Sura faded soon after. Which ended the centuries-long great scholarly reputation given to Babylonian Jews, as the center of Jewish thought.

== Islamic Arab period ==
The Arabs conquered Iraq from the Sassanids in the 630s. Ali made Kufa, in Iraq, his capital, and it was there that Jews expelled from the Arabian Peninsula went (about 641). The capture by Ali of Firuz Shabur, where 90,000 Jews are said to have dwelt, is mentioned by the Jewish chroniclers. Mar Isaac, chief of the academy of Sura, paid homage to the caliph, and received privileges from him.

The first legal expression of Islam toward the dhimmis (Jews, Christians, and Zoroastrians) after the conquests were the institution of the poll-tax ("jizyah") and the tax upon real estate ("kharaj"). The kharaj land tax led to mass migration of Babylonian Jews from the countryside to cities like Baghdad. This in turn led to greater wealth and international influence, as well as a more cosmopolitan outlook from Jewish thinkers such as Saadiah Gaon, who now deeply engaged with Western philosophy for the first time.

The Umayyad caliph, Umar ibn Abd al-Aziz (717–720), issued orders to his governors: "Tear down no church, synagogue, or fire-temple; but permit no new ones to be built". Isaac Iskawi II (about 800) received from Harun al-Rashid (786–809) confirmation of the right to carry a seal of office. At the court of the Harun an embassy from the emperor Charlemagne included which a Jew, Isaac, took part. In 850, al-Rashid's grandson al-Muttawakil issued a decree according to which all dhimmis (including the Jews) would need to wear in addition to the already established zunnar a honey-coloured outer garment and badge-like patches on their servant's clothing, by which he began the long tradition of differentiation by colour.

Like the Arabs, the Jews were zealous promoters of knowledge, and by translating Greek and Latin The caliph al-Mu'tadid (892–902) ranked the Jews as "state servants".

When the Abbasid Caliphate and the city of Baghdad declined in the 10th century, many Babylonian Jews migrated to the Mediterranean region, contributing to the spread of Babylonian Jewish customs throughout the Jewish world. Under the Seljuk Empire, new decrees enforcing discriminatory dress laws for non-Muslims were promulgated in 1091 by Abu Shuja al-Rudhrawari and in 1121 under sultan Mahmud II. As was often the case throughout Islamic history, the non-Muslims agreed to pay a substantial sum of money to the sultan so that decree be not enforced.

== Mongol period ==
The Caliphate hastened to its end before the rising power of the Mongol Empire. As Bar Hebraeus remarks, these Mongol tribes knew no distinction between heathens, Jews, and Christians; and their Great Khan Kublai Khan showed himself just toward the Jews who served in his army, as reported by Marco Polo. Iraq's Jewish community reached an apex in the 12th century, with 40,000 Jews, 28 synagogues, and ten yeshivot, or Rabbinic academies, according to the Jewish traveller Benjamin de Tudela, who visited in the 12th century. Under Mongol rule (1258–1335) Jewish physician Sa'ad Al-Dawla served as musharrif, or assistant director of the financial administration of Baghdad, as well as Chief Vizier of the Mongol Empire.

Hulagu (a Buddhist), the destroyer of the Caliphate (1258) and the conqueror of Palestine (1260), was tolerant toward Muslims, Jews and Christians; but there can be no doubt that in those days of terrible warfare the Jews must have suffered much with others. Under the Mongolian rulers, the priests of all religions were exempt from the poll-tax. Hulagu's second son, Aḥmed, embraced Islam, but his successor, Arghun (1284–1291), hated the Muslims and was friendly to Jews and Christians; his chief counselor was a Jew, Sa'ad al-Dawla, a physician of Baghdad. It proved a false dawn. The power of Sa’ad al-Dawla was so vexatious to the Muslim population the churchman Bar Hebraeus wrote so "were the Muslims reduced to having a Jew in the place of honor." This was exacerbated by Sa’d al-Dawla, who ordered no Muslim be employed by the official bureaucracy. He was also known as a fearsome tax collection and rumours swirled he was planning to create a new religion of which Arghun was supposed to be the prophet. Sa’d al-Dawla was murdered two days before the death of his Arghun, then stricken by illness, by his enemies in court.

After the death of the great khan and the murder of his Jewish favorite, the Muslims fell upon the Jews, and Baghdad witnessed a regular battle between them. Gaykhatu also had a Jewish minister of finance, Reshid al-Dawla. The khan Ghazan also became a Muslim, and made the Jews second class citizens. The Egyptian sultan Naṣr, who also ruled over Iraq, reestablished the same law in 1330, and saddled it with new limitations. During this period attacks on Jews greatly increased. The situation grew dire for the Jewish community as Muslim chronicler Abbas al-’Azzawi recorded: "These events which befell the Jews after they had attained a high standing in the state caused them to lower their voices. [Since then] we have not heard from them anything worthy of recording because they were prevented from participation in its government and politics. They were neglected and their voice was only heard [again] after a long time."

Baghdad, reduced in importance, ravaged by wars and invasions, was eclipsed as the commercial and political centre of the Arab world. The Jewish community, shuttered out of political life, were reduced too and the status of the Exilarch and the Rabbis of the city diminished. Great numbers of Jews began to depart, seeking tranquility elsewhere in the Middle East beyond a now troubled frontier. Mongolian fury once again devastated the localities inhabited by Jews, when, in 1393, Timur captured Baghdad, Wasit, Hilla, Basra, and Tikrit, after obstinate resistance. Many Jews who had fled to Baghdad were slaughtered. Others escaped the city to Kurdistan and Syria. Many were not so fortunate, with one report mentioning 10,000 Jews killed in Mosul, Basra, and Husun Kifa.

The ruins of Baghdad after Timur's conquests was described in 1437 by the Muslim chronicler Al-Maqrizi: "Baghdad is in ruins. It has no mosque, no congregation of believers, no call to prayer and no markets. Most of the date palms have withered. Most of the irrigation canals are blocked. It cannot be called a city." After the death of Timur, the region fell into the hands of marauding Turkmen tribesmen who were unable to establish a government of any kind. Ravaged by conquest, Iraq fell into lawlessness and became close to uninhabitable. Roads became dangerous and irrigation systems collapsed, seeing precious farmland in the delta region sink below water. Rapacious Bedouin filled the vacuum, rendering the caravan trade all but impossible. Denied authority of any kind and severed from its historic trading ties with the Middle East and the Far East, the ancient city of Baghdad had become a minor town.

The cumulative effect of the Mongol rampage and the social collapse that followed was that of the pre-existing Jewish community of Baghdad either died or fled. Jewish life entered a Dark Age. According to historian Zvi Yehuda, the fifteenth century sees no reports on Jews in Baghdad or in its surroundings, in Basra, Hilla, Kifil, ‘Ana, Kurdistan, even in Persia and the Persian Gulf. The organized Jewish community of Iraq appears to have disappeared in this period for more than four generations. This is behind the discontinuity between the present traditions of Iraqi Jewry and the Babylonian traditions of Talmudic or Geonic times. It remains the case that most Jewish Iraqis are of indigenous Middle Eastern ancestry rather than migrants from Spain, as in the case of parts of North Africa and the Levant.

== Ottoman rule: 1534–1917 ==
During Ottoman rule (1534–1917) Jewish life prospered in Iraq. Jews were afforded religious liberties, enabling them to administer their own affairs in Jewish education. Tolerance towards Jews and Jewish customs, however, depended on local rulers. Ottoman ruler Sultan Murad IV appointed 10,000 Jewish officers in his government, as he valued the Baghdadi Jews. In contrast, Murad's governor Dauod Pasha was cruel and was responsible for the emigration of many Iraqi Jews. After Dauod's death in 1851, Jewish involvement in commerce and politics increased, with religious influence also transforming. The Iraqi Jewish community introduced the Hakham Bashi, or Chief Rabbinate, in 1849, with Hakham Ezra Dangoor leading the community. The chief rabbi was also president of the community and was assisted by a lay council, a religious court, and a schools committee.

=== Early Ottoman period ===
After various changes of fortune, Mesopotamia and Iraq came into the hands of the Ottoman Turks, when Sultan Suleiman the Magnificent in 1534 took Tabriz and Baghdad from the Persians, leading to an improvement in the life of the Jews. The Persian reconquest in 1623 during the Ottoman–Safavid War (1623–1639) led to a much worse situation, so that the re-conquest of Iraq by the Turks in 1638 included an army with a large population of Jews. Some sources say they made up 10% of the army. The day of the reconquest was even given a holiday, "Yom Nes" (day of miracle).

This period of Mameluk rule in Iraq, under the aegis of the Ottoman Empire, united most of the future territory of Iraq into a single unit for the first time. As it ceased to be a warring frontier, opportunities for trade increased, especially due to the growing European presence on the ocean routes to India. Following this uptick in trade and security, Jewish communities began to be reestablished in Baghdad and Basra.

It has been suggested by historian Zvi Yehuda that this was not the revival of a community so much as the establishment of a new one which he calls the "new Babylonian Diaspora" although there were always Jews in what is now Iraq.

=== Eighteenth century ===
In 1743, there was a plague in which many of the Jews of Baghdad, including all the rabbis, died. The remaining Baghdad community asked the community of Aleppo to send them a new Chief Rabbi, leading to the appointment of Rabbi Sadka Bekhor Hussein. Culturally, it would prove a decisive moment when Chief Rabbi Shmuel Laniyado of Aleppo picked his protege for Baghdad. It is said he was accompanied by fifty Sephardic Jewish families from Aleppo. Many of them were Rabbis who were to sit on the Beth Din of Baghdad and Basra.

This led to an assimilation of Iraqi Judaism to the general Sephardic mode of observance. Jewish culture revived, with communal leaders as Solomon Ma’tuk being renown for his work as an astronomer, library and piyyutim. This brought the leading Jewish families of Baghdad, and with it, their Jewish practice into the network of Sephardic scribes and later printing presses established in Aleppo, Livorno and Salonica. Surviving records of the contents of the library of Solomon Ma’tuk shows a great number of books purchased from Sephardic scribes and some even originally from Spain.

Further driving this process was the high esteem in which Rabbi Sadka Bekhor Hussein was held as a halakhic authority. This saw him accepted as a halakhic authority by the Jews of Persia, Kurdistan and the fledgling Baghdadi trading outposts being established in India. Sephardic Rabbis and their rulings and practices were held in higher esteem. The historian Zvi Yehuda says the period saw the wheels turn in the relationship between the Babylonian Jewish communities and those of Iraq and Persia: "Before the 18th century, the Baghdadi Community needed the support of those communities; now the Baghdadi Community influenced them."

The 18th century saw the Jewish community of Aleppo exert a significant influence over the Jewish communities of Baghdad and Basra not only culturally but economically. Syrian Jewish families establishing themselves in Iraq were often formerly Spanish Sephardic families from Aleppo. These were typically high-class families such as the Belilios family who were frustrated with the dimming prospects of Aleppo and attracted to Baghdad and Basra's booming trade with India. This process saw the leading Jewish families of Baghdad, Basra and Aleppo grow to be heavily interlinked through marriages, religious life, partnership and trade in the 18th century.

As this process of cultural assimilation saw the Jews of Baghdad come to more closely resemble the Jews of Aleppo, economic decline in Syria, Kurdistan and Persia worsened. The 18th century saw a growing number of Jews leave from there to Baghdad, Basra or the Baghdadi-led outposts being established in the Far East. The still small and reemerging Jewish community of Baghdad became a migration destination with Jewish families settling in Baghdad from Istanbul, Aleppo, Damascus, Ana and Basra. A key driver of this was decline of the old caravan route running between these cities. There was also migration from the communities of Palestine, the villages of Kurdistan, and it is said that a handful of Jews settled in Baghdad from Germany.

=== Nineteenth century ===
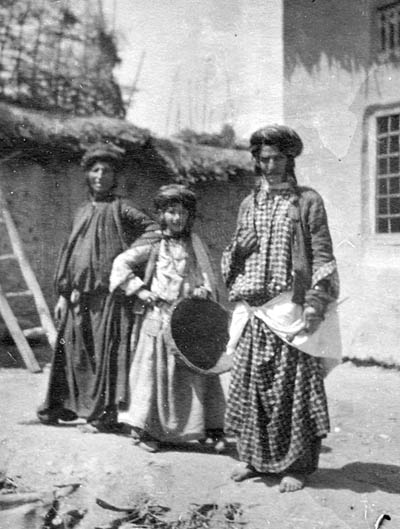
Jews in Rawanduz, northern Iraq, 1905

By the early 19th century, Baghdad had been reestablished as a leading Jewish center in the Middle East. There were over 6,000 Jews in city, two synagogues and strong community institutions. This was not a golden age, however. Over time, the centralized Ottoman control over the region deteriorated and the situation of the Jews worsened, but the population continued to grow very rapidly. An example of this deterioration is the persecution of Dawud Pasha, which began in 1814 and lasted until 1831. Many leaders of the Jewish community, such as Solomon Ma’tuk, were forced to flee. One of the foremost leaders of the community, David Sassoon, was forced to flee first to Busher and then to India.

By the early 19th century, trade between Baghdad and India was said to be entirely in the hands of the Jewish community. Though Jewish traders from the Middle East had been crossing the Indian Ocean since antiquity, the deteriorating situation in the Ottoman Empire and the rise of commercial opportunities in British India saw many Jews from Iraq establish themselves permanently in India, at first in Surat, then especially in Calcutta and Bombay. This was the beginning of primarily Iraqi Jewish diaspora in Asia known as the Baghdadi Jews, to which David Sassoon and many of the other leading Jewish families in Baghdad fled the persecution of Dawud Pasha. These Judeo-Iraqi Arabic or Baghdadi Judeo Arabic speaking communities, following mostly Iraqi Jewish customs, would be formed along the so-called opium route between India and China, including in Singapore, Hong Kong and Shanghai. These were all led by leading Iraqi Jewish families such as the Sassoons, Ezras, Eliases, Gubbays and Judahs. These families were active sponsors of religious life and charity back in Iraq.

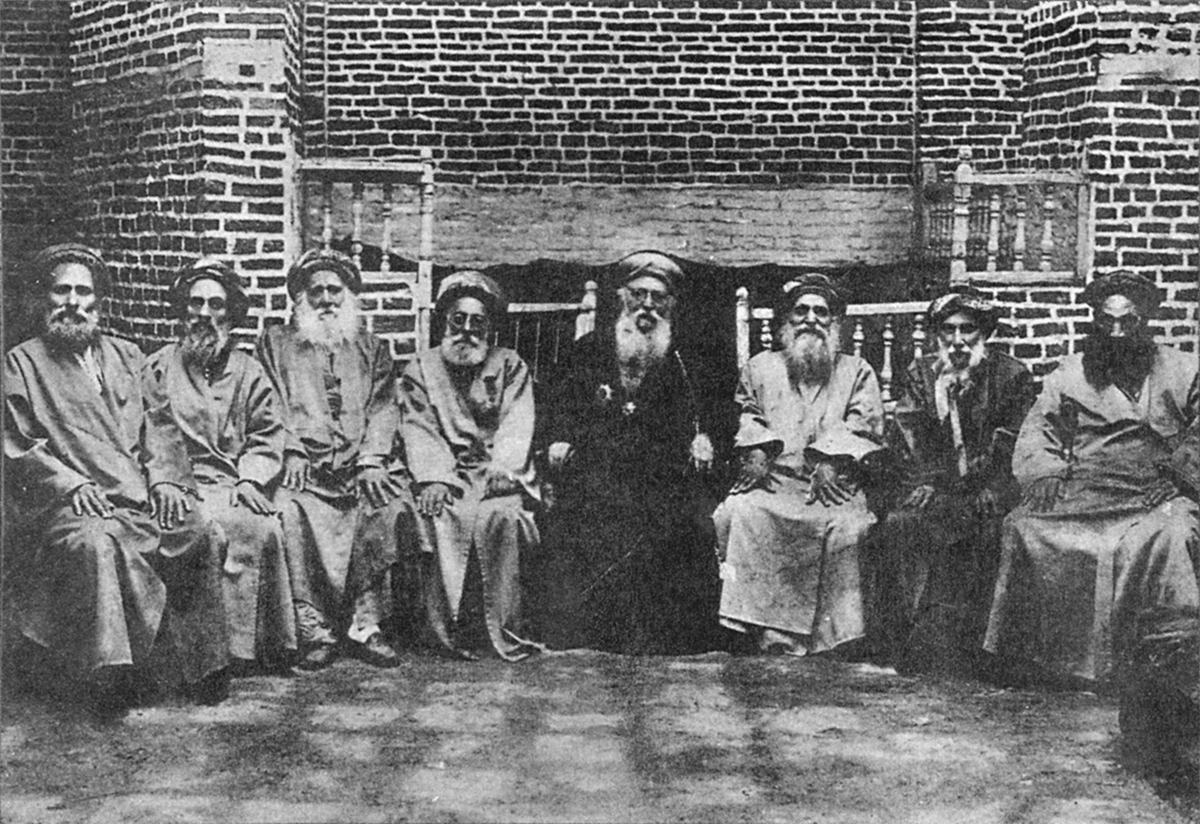
Rabbis of Iraq at the beginning of the twentieth century

Israel Joseph Benjamin, the Ashkenazi Jewish traveller and scholar from Moldova, who conducted extensive journeys to visit even the most furthest flung Sephardic and Mizrahi Jewish communities of Asia between 1845 and 1859, wrote of Baghdad that "in no other place in the east have I found my Israelitish brothers in such perfectly happy circumstances."

During the 19th century, the influence of the Jewish families of Aleppo of the previous century faded as Baghdad emerged as a strong Jewish and economic center in its own right. The Jewish population has grown so rapidly that by 1884, there were 30,000 Jews in Baghdad and by 1900, 50,000, comprising over a quarter of the city's total population. Large-scale Jewish immigration from Kurdistan to Baghdad continued throughout this period. By the mid-19th century, the religious infrastructure of Baghdad grew to include a large yeshiva which trained up to sixty rabbis at time. Religious scholarship flourished in Baghdad, which produced great rabbis, such as Joseph Hayyim ben Eliahu Mazal-Tov, known as the Ben Ish Chai (1834–1909) or Rabbi Abdallah Somekh (1813–1889).

== Kurdish rule ==
Under the rule of Mir Muhammad the Jewish population was affected by violence and looting notably during the Siege of Amadiya. They “were treated with merciless cruelty and oppression." Many were forced to migrate and some fled the city after its fall. Similar reports are mentioned for other towns under his control, including Ranya, Khoy, Erbil, Aqra, and Zakho. After the Kurds sacked Mosul during the Yazidi campaign, they also killed the local Jews and Christians. Dr. Lobdell, an American missionary, visited Mir Muhammad in Urmia, where he wrote: “The Pasha of Ravendooz told me that when he was first appointed to that district (Urmia), three years since, Jews were bought and sold by the Koords as commonly as don-keys.”

Following the defeat of Mir Muhammad, Amadiya came under the rule of the Ottoman governor of Mosul. The situation of the Jewish community improved slightly.

== Modern Iraq ==
=== The State of Iraq ===
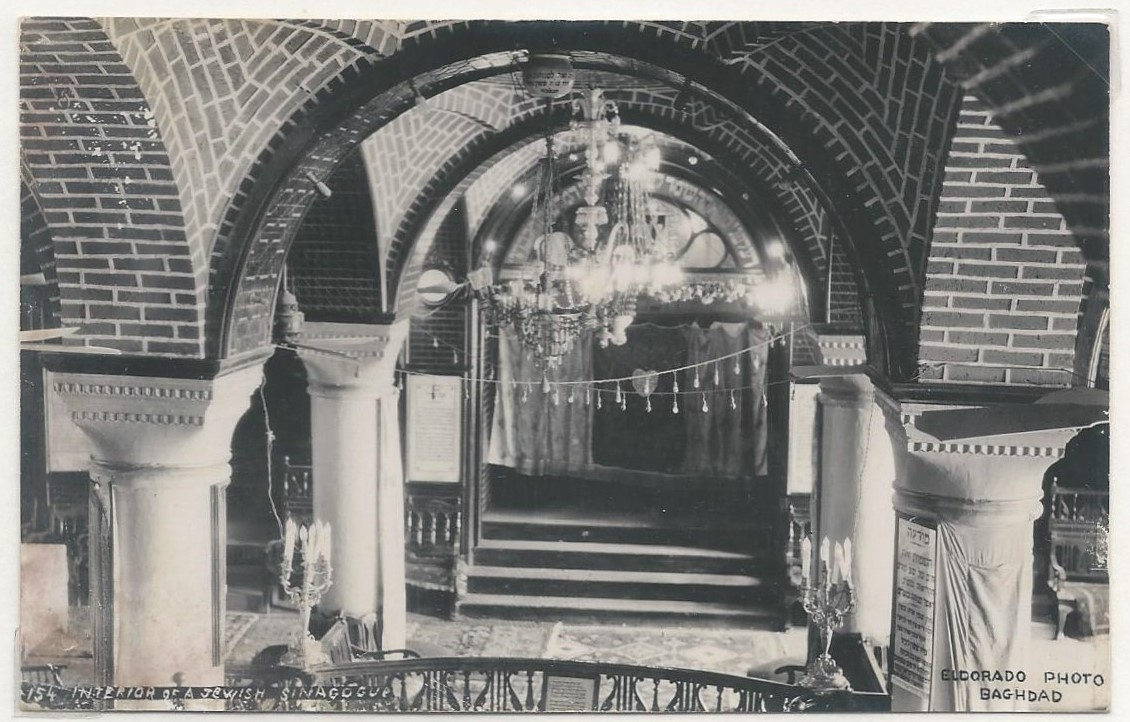
The Great Synagogue of Baghdad circa early 20th century

About 200,000 Jews lived in Iraq, in 1948 and 200,000 Jews in Kurdistan region of Northern Iraq.

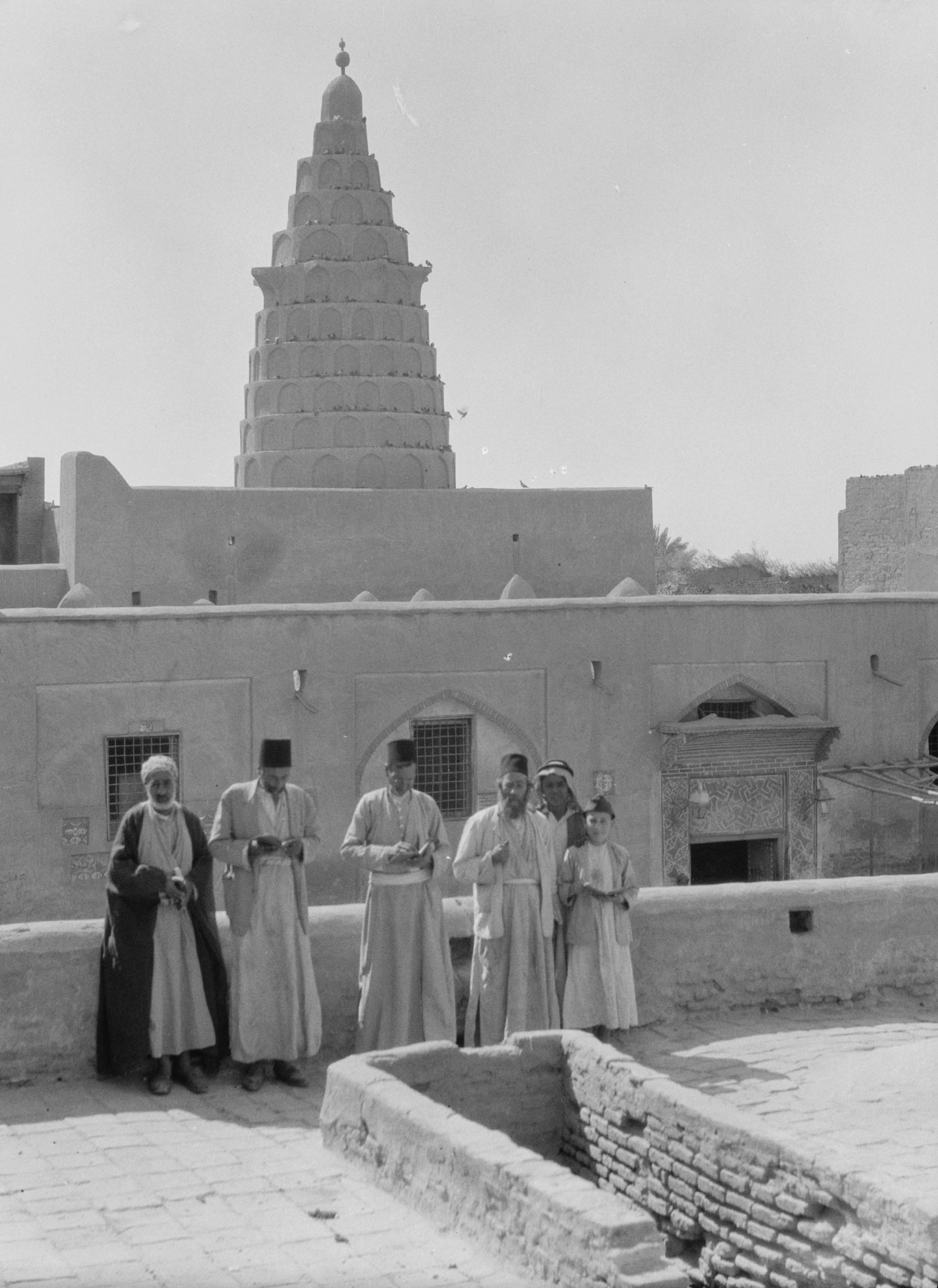
1932 photograph of Ezekiel's Tomb at Kifl. The area was inhabited by Iraqi Jews who appear in the photo.

During the British Mandate, beginning in 1920, and in the early days after independence in 1932, well-educated Jews played an important role in civic life. They were important in developing the judicial and postal systems. Iraq's first minister of finance, Sassoon Eskell, was a Jew and there were other Jewish MPs in the Iraqi parliament including Reuben Somekh. Records from the Baghdad Chamber of Commerce show that 10 out of its 19 members in 1947 were Jews and the first musical band formed for Baghdad's nascent radio in the 1930s consisted mainly of Jews. Jews were represented in the Iraqi parliament, and held significant positions in the bureaucracy. and the government Between 1924 and 1928, some Jews fled persecution in Russia, arriving in Iraq as refugees. In Baghdad's markets, they were prominent jewelers, smiths, and cloth dealers. In Basra, many Jews worked at the important port authority. They introduced foreign brands to Iraq, such as Chevrolet and Ford Motor. The Jews established factories for the manufacture of soap, woolen textiles, cigarettes, gold and silver crafting, printing, and others.

==== Zionism in Iraq ====
Organized Zionist activity began in Iraq in the 1920s. The Jewish population was generally sympathetic toward the movement, although not at that time as a solution for Iraqi Jews. The Zionist organization in Baghdad was initially granted a permit by the British, in March 1921, but in the following year, under the government of King Faisal I, was unable to renew it. Nevertheless, its activities were tolerated until 1929. In that year, after conflict and bloodshed in Palestine during anti-Zionist demonstrations and riots, Zionist activities were banned and teachers from Palestine, who had taught Hebrew and Jewish history, were forced to leave.

In the 1930s, the situation of the Jews in Iraq deteriorated. Previously, the growing Iraqi Arab nationalist sentiment included Iraqi Jews as fellow Arabs, but these views changed with the ongoing conflict in the Palestinian Mandate and the introduction of Nazi propaganda. Despite protestations of their loyalty to Iraq, Iraqi Jews were increasingly subject to discrimination and anti-Jewish actions. In September 1934, following the appointment of Arshad al-Umari as the new minister of economics and communications, tens of Jews were dismissed from their posts in that ministry; and, subsequently, there were unofficial quotas of Jews that could be appointed in the civil service or admitted to secondary schools and colleges. Zionist activity had continued covertly even after 1929, but in 1935 the last two Palestinian Jewish teachers were deported, and the president of the Zionist organization was put on trial and ultimately required to leave the country.

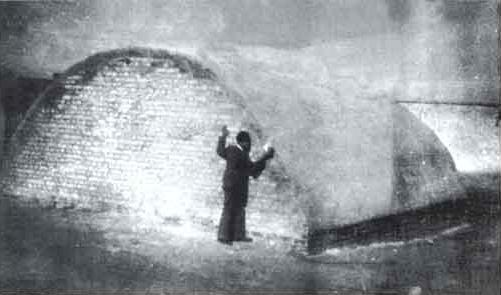
Mass grave for the victims of the Farhud in 1946

Following the collapse of Rashid Ali al-Gaylani's pro-Axis coup d'état in 1941, the Farhud ("violent dispossession") pogrom broke out in Baghdad on June 1, in which approximately 200 Iraqi Jews were murdered (some sources put the number higher), up to 2,000 injured, and many raped – damages to Jewish-owned property were estimated at $3 million (US$ 66 million in 2025). There were also instances of looting of Jewish properties in many other cities at around the same time, with the pogrom lasting for two days until June 2. Afterwards, Jewish emissaries from Palestine were sent to teach Iraqi Jews self-defense, which they were eager to learn. The newly restored pro-Allied monarchist regime quickly implemented measures to prevent the outbreak of similar anti-Jewish violence and established a committee of enquiry on June 7 "to examine the facts and find who was culpable."

=== Persecution by Iraqi authorities ===
Before the United Nations Partition Plan for Palestine vote, Iraq's prime minister Nuri al-Said informed British diplomat Douglas Busk "that he had nothing against Iraqi Jews who were a long established and useful community. He felt bound to tell me, however, that the Arab League meeting might decide that if a satisfactory solution of the Palestine case was not reached severe measures should be taken against all Jews in Arab countries. He would be unable to resist such a proposal."

In a speech at the United Nations General Assembly Hall at Flushing Meadow, New York, on Friday, November 28, 1947, Iraq's Foreign Minister, Muhammad Fadhel al-Jamali, included the following statement:

Partition imposed against the will of the majority of the people will jeopardize peace and harmony in the Middle East. Not only the uprising of the Arabs of Palestine is to be expected, but the masses in the Arab world cannot be restrained. The Arab-Jewish relationship in the Arab world will greatly deteriorate. There are more Jews in the Arab world outside of Palestine than there are in Palestine. In Iraq alone, we have about one hundred and fifty thousand Jews who share with Muslims and Christians all the advantages of political and economic rights. Harmony prevails among Muslims, Christians and Jews. But any injustice imposed upon the Arabs of Palestine will disturb the harmony among Jews and non-Jews in Iraq; it will breed inter-religious prejudice and hatred.

In the months leading up to the November 1947 Partition vote, violence against Iraqi Jews increased. In May 1947, a Jewish man in Baghdad was lynched by an angry mob after being accused of giving poisoned candy to Arab children. Rioters ransacked homes in the Jewish Quarter of Fallujah, and the Jewish population there fled to Baghdad. Large Jewish "donations" for the Palestinian Arab cause were regularly extorted, with the names of "donors" read out on the radio to encourage more. In spite of this, Iraqi Jews still mostly continued to view themselves as loyal Iraqis and believed that the hardship would pass. The Jewish Agency's emissary to Iraq reported that "No attention is paid [by the Jews] to the frightful manifestations of hostility around them, which place all Jews on the verge of a volcano about to erupt."

In 1948, the year of Israel's independence, there were about 150,000 Jews in Iraq. Persecution of Jews greatly increased that year. In July 1948, the government passed a law making Zionism a capital offense, with a minimum sentence of seven years imprisonment. Any Jew could be convicted of Zionism-based only on the sworn testimony of two Muslim witnesses, with virtually no avenue of appeal available. On August 28, 1948, Jews were forbidden to engage in banking or foreign currency transactions. In September 1948, Jews were dismissed from the railways, the post office, the telegraph department, and the Finance Ministry on the ground that they were suspected of "sabotage and treason". On October 8, 1948, the issuance of export and import licenses to Jewish merchants was forbidden. On October 19, 1948, the discharge of all Jewish officials and workers from all governmental departments was ordered. In October, the Egyptian paper El-Ahram estimated that as a result of arrests, trials, and sequestration of property, the Iraqi treasury collected some 20 million dinars or the equivalent of 80 million U.S. dollars. On December 2, 1948, the Iraq government suggested to oil companies operating in Iraq that no Jewish employees be accepted.

Following the Israeli Declaration of Independence and Iraq's subsequent participation in the 1948 Arab–Israeli War, Iraq was placed under martial law. Courts martial were used to intimidate wealthy Jews, Jews were again dismissed from civil service, quotas were placed on university positions, and Jewish businesses were boycotted. In sweeps throughout urban areas, the Iraqi authorities searched thousands of Jewish homes for secret caches of money they were presumed to be sending to Israel. Walls were frequently demolished in these searches. Hundreds of Jews were arrested on suspicion of Zionist activity, tortured into confessing, and subjected to heavy fines and lengthy prison sentences. In one case, a Jewish man was sentenced to five years' hard labor for possessing a Biblical Hebrew inscription which was presumed to be a coded Zionist message.

The greatest shock to the Jewish community came with the arrest and execution of businessman Shafiq Ades, a Jewish automobile importer who was the single wealthiest Jew in the country. Ades, who had displayed no interest in Zionism, was arrested on charges of sending military equipment to Israel and convicted by a military tribunal. He was fined $20 million and sentenced to death. His entire estate was liquidated and he was publicly hanged in Basra in September 1948. The Jewish community's general sentiment was that if an assimilated and non-Zionist Jew as powerful and well-connected as Ades could be eliminated, other Jews would not be protected any longer. Additionally, like most Arab League states, Iraq forbade any legal emigration of its Jews on the grounds that they might go to Israel and could strengthen that state. At the same time, increasing government oppression of the Jews fueled by anti-Israeli sentiment together with public expressions of antisemitism created an atmosphere of fear and uncertainty.

The Iraqi Jewish community gradually became impoverished because of persecution. Jewish businesses were forced to close in the face of boycotts and arrests of Jewish businessmen. After Jews were prohibited from working in the civil service, skilled and formerly well-paid Jewish civil service employees were driven into poverty and forced to become street peddlers to avoid being arrested for vagrancy. Jewish home values dropped by 80%. On February 19, 1949, Nuri al-Said acknowledged the bad treatment that the Jews had been victims of in Iraq during the recent months. He warned that unless Israel behaved itself, events might take place concerning the Iraqi Jews.

=== Operation Ezra and Nehemiah ===
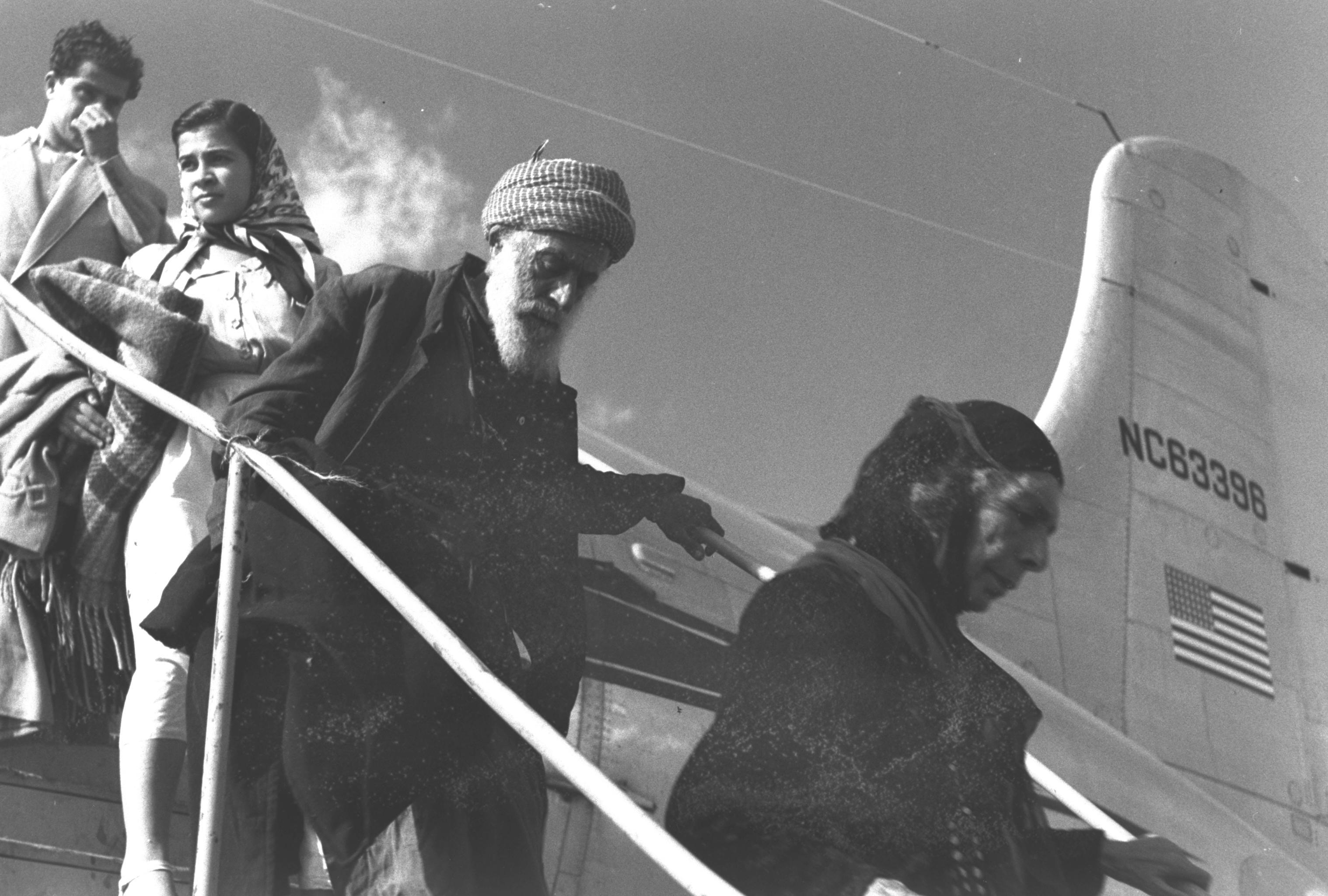
Iraqi Jews arriving in Israel on a flight from Cyprus, September 1950

With Iraqi Jews enduring oppression and being driven into destitution, the Iraqi Zionist underground began smuggling Jews out of Iraq to Israel starting in November 1948. Jews were smuggled into Iran and from there proceeded to Israel. By 1949, the Iraqi Zionist underground had become well-established (despite many arrests), and they were smuggling Iraqi Jews out of the country illegally at a rate of 1,000 a month. The fleeing Jews took money and some possessions with them, and this capital flight harmed the Iraqi economy. Hoping to stem the flow of assets from the country, in March 1950 Iraq passed a law of one-year duration allowing Jews to emigrate on condition of relinquishing their Iraqi citizenship. They were motivated, according to Ian Black, by "economic considerations, chief of which was that almost all the property of departing Jews reverted to the state treasury" and also that "Jews were seen as a restive and potentially troublesome minority that the country was best rid of." Iraqi politicians candidly admitted that they wanted to expel their Jewish population for reasons of their own.

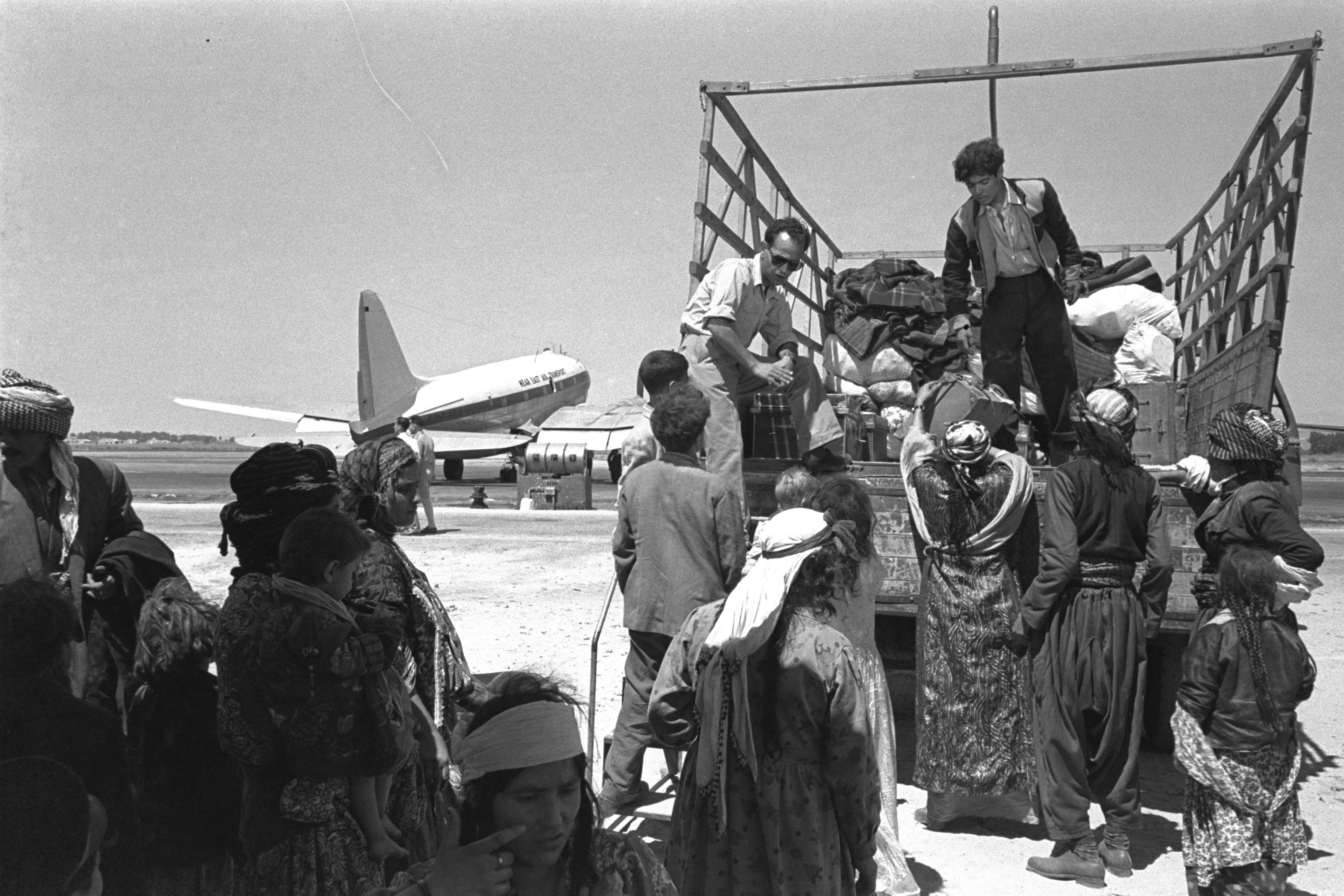
Jewish refugees from Iraq at Lod Airport preparing to leave for a Ma'abara, May 1951

Israel was initially reluctant to absorb so many immigrants, but mounted an airlift in March 1951 called "Operation Ezra and Nehemiah" to bring as many of the Iraqi Jews as possible to Israel, and sent agents to Iraq to urge the Jews to register for immigration as soon as possible. Iraqi Jews mainly left Iraq for Cyprus and Iran, from where they were airlifted to Israel, though for a time direct flights between Israel and Baghdad were allowed. From the start of the emigration law in March 1950 until the end of the year, 60,000 Jews registered to leave Iraq. In addition to continuing arrests and the dismissal of Jews from their jobs, this exodus was encouraged by a series of bombings starting in April 1950 that resulted in a number of injuries and a few deaths. Two months before the expiration of the law, by which time about 85,000 Jews had registered, another bomb at the Masuda Shemtov synagogue killed 3 or 5 Jews and injured many others. Iraqi Prime Minister Nuri al-Said was determined to drive the Jews out of his country as quickly as possible, and on August 21, 1950, he threatened to revoke the license of the company transporting the Jewish exodus if it did not fulfill its daily quota of 500 Jews.

The available planes initially did not match the demand, and as a result many Jews had to wait for extended periods of time in Iraq while awaiting transport to Israel. These Jews, having already been denaturalized and renounced all property, were now stateless and destitute, and many were now homeless and sleeping on the streets. The Iraqi government announced that if the Jews were not removed more swiftly, they would be placed in concentration camps. As a result, more airlines were chartered to speed up the exodus. On September 18, 1950, Nuri al-Said summoned a representative of the Jewish community and claimed Israel was behind the emigration delay, threatening to "take them to the borders" and forcibly expel the Jews. The law expired in March 1951 but was later extended after the Iraqi government froze the assets of departing Jews, including those who had already left. During the next few months, all but a few thousand of the remaining Jews registered for emigration, spurred on by a sequence of further bombings that caused few casualties but had great psychological impact.

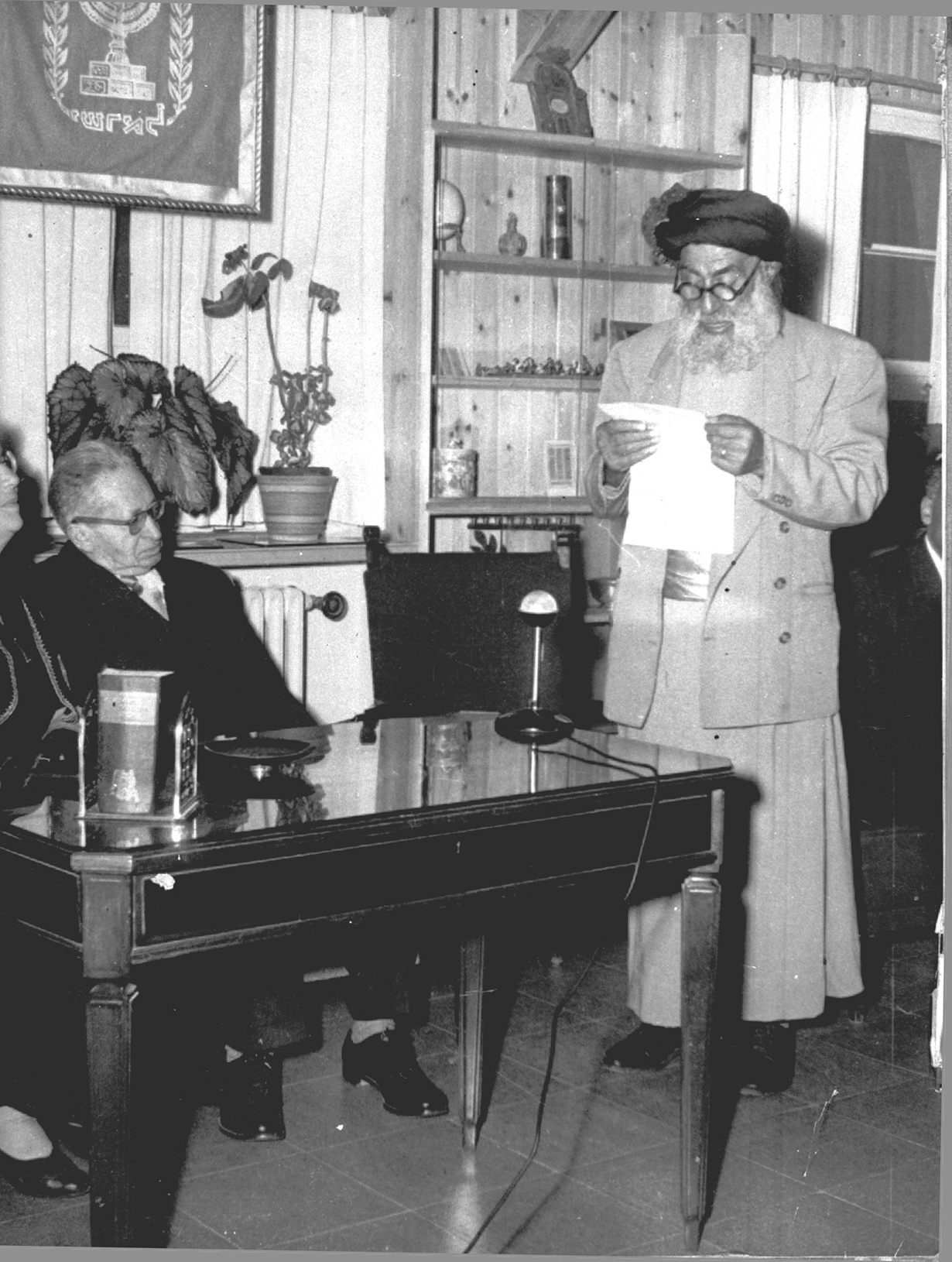
Rabbi Moshe Gabai petitioning President Ben-Zvi to help his Zacho, Iraq, community, 1951

Israel's fragile infrastructure, which already had to accommodate a mass influx of Jewish immigration from war-ravaged Europe and other Arab and Muslim countries, was heavily strained, and the Israeli government was not certain that it had enough permanent housing units and tents to accommodate the Iraqi Jews. When Israel attempted to negotiate a more gradual influx of Iraqi Jews, Said realized that the Jews could be turned into a demographic weapon against Israel. He hoped that a rapid influx of totally penniless Jews would collapse Israel's infrastructure. In March 1951, he engineered a law which would permanently freeze all assets of denaturalized Jews. Officially, the assets were merely frozen and not confiscated; under international law assets can theoretically remain frozen for perpetuity, making it impossible for them to ever be reclaimed. The law was prepared in secret, as it was being ratified, Baghdad's telephone network suspended operations to prevent Jews from learning of it and attempt to transfer or withdraw their money. Iraq's Banks were closed for three days to ensure that Jews could not access their funds.

With Iraq's Jews effectively stripped of their assets permanently, Said demanded Israel accept 10,000 Iraqi Jewish refugees per month. He threatened to prohibit Jewish emigration from May 31, 1951, and to set up concentration camps for stateless Jews still in Iraq. Israel attempted to negotiate a compromise to enable the Iraqi Jews to leave gradually in a way that did not put as much pressure on Israel's absorptive capacity, but Said was adamant that the Jews had to leave as fast as possible. As a result, Israel increased the flights. In Baghdad, the daily spectacle of Jews carrying nothing but their clothes and a bag of their remaining possessions being loaded onto trucks for transport to the airport caused public jubilation. Jews were mocked every step of the way during their departure and crowds stoned the trucks taking Jews to the airport. Jews were allowed to bring out a maximum of five pounds weight in property, which was to consist of personal effects only, as well as a small amount of cash. At the airport, Iraqi officials body searched every emigrant for cash or jewelry, and they also beat and spat on the departing Jews.

Overall, between 1948 and 1951, 121,633 Iraqi Jews were airlifted, bused, or smuggled out of the country, including 119,788 between January 1950 and December 1951. About 15,000 Jews remained in Iraq. In 1952, emigration to Israel was again banned, and the Iraqi government publicly hanged two Jews who had been falsely charged with throwing a bomb at the Baghdad office of the U.S. Information Agency. According to Palestinian politician Aref al-Aref, Said had attempted to justify allowing the exodus by explaining to him that: "The Jews have always been a source of evil and harm to Iraq. They are spies. They have sold their property in Iraq, they have no land among us that they can cultivate. How therefore can they live? What will they do if they stay in Iraq? No, no my friend, it is better for us to be rid of them as long as we are able to do so." Iraqi Jews left behind them extensive property, often located in the heart of Iraq's major cities. A relatively high number found themselves in refugee camps in Israel known as Ma'abarot before being given permanent housing.

=== 1950–1951 Baghdad bombings ===
The agents behind the 1950-1951 Baghdad bombings are a subject of controversy. A secret Israeli inquiry in 1960 found no evidence that they were ordered by Israel or any motive that would have explained the attack, though it did find out that most of the witnesses believed that Jews had been responsible for the bombings. The issue remains unresolved: Iraqi activists still regularly charge that Israel used violence to engineer the exodus, while Israeli officials of the time vehemently deny it. Historian Moshe Gat reports that "the belief that the bombs had been thrown by Zionist agents was shared by those Iraqi Jews who had just reached Israel". Sociologist Phillip Mendes backs Gat's claims, and further attributes the allegations to have been influenced and distorted by feelings of discrimination.

The affair has also been the subject of a libel lawsuit by Mordechai Ben Porat, which was settled in an out-of-court compromise with an apology of the journalist who described the charges as true. Iraqi authorities eventually charged three members of the Zionist underground with perpetrating some of the explosions. Two of those charged, Shalom Salah Shalom and Yosef Ibrahim Basri, were subsequently found guilty and executed, while the third was sentenced to a lengthy jail term. Salah Shalom claimed in his trial that he was tortured into confessing, and Yosef Basri maintained his innocence throughout. Gat reports that much of the previous literature "reflects the universal conviction that the bombings had a tremendous impact on the large-scale exodus of the Jews... To be more precise it is suggested that the Zionist emissaries committed these brutal acts in order to uproot the prosperous Iraqi Jewish community and bring it to Israel". However, Gat argues that both claims are contrary to the evidence. As summarized by Mendes:

Historian Moshe Gat argues that there was little direct connection between the bombings and exodus. He demonstrates that the frantic and massive Jewish registration for denaturalization and departure was driven by knowledge that the denaturalisation law was due to expire in March 1951. He also notes the influence of further pressures including the property-freezing law, and continued anti-Jewish disturbances which raised the fear of large-scale pogroms. In addition, it is highly unlikely the Israelis would have taken such measures to accelerate the Jewish evacuation given that they were already struggling to cope with the existing level of Jewish immigration. Gat also raises serious doubts about the guilt of the alleged Jewish bombthrowers. Firstly, a Christian officer in the Iraqi army known for his anti-Jewish views, was arrested, but apparently not charged, with the offences. A number of explosive devices similar to those used in the attack on the Jewish synagogue were found in his home. In addition, there was a long history of anti-Jewish bomb-throwing incidents in Iraq. Secondly, the prosecution was not able to produce even one eyewitness who had seen the bombs thrown. Thirdly, the Jewish defendant Shalom Salah indicated in court that he had been severely tortured in order to procure a confession. It therefore remains an open question as to who was responsible for the bombings, although Gat argues that the most likely perpetrators were members of the anti-Jewish Istiqlal Party. Certainly memories and interpretations of the events have further been influenced and distorted by the unfortunate discrimination which many Iraqi Jews experienced on their arrival in Israel.

Many years later, the widow of the Zionist emissary Yehuda Tager stated that while the main bombings were carried out by the Muslim Brotherhood, later smaller attacks were staged by Yosef Beit-Halahmi, on his own initiative, in an attempt to make it seem as if the activists on trial were not the perpetrators. In Three Worlds: Memoirs of an Arab-Jew, Avi Shlaim unveils what he argues is "undeniable proof of Zionist involvement in the terrorist attacks" which prompted a mass exodus of Jews from Iraq between 1950 and 1951. The historian based his conclusion that most of the bombings against Jews in Iraq were the work of Mossad on two pieces of evidence: one draws on the recollections given to Shlaim by an elderly former member of the Zionist undergroundi. The other is a contempèorary Baghdad police report on the incident, which contains Basri's confession. He believed these actions were intended to quicken the transfer of 110,000 Jews in Iraq to the then-newly created state of Israel.

== Republic of Iraq ==
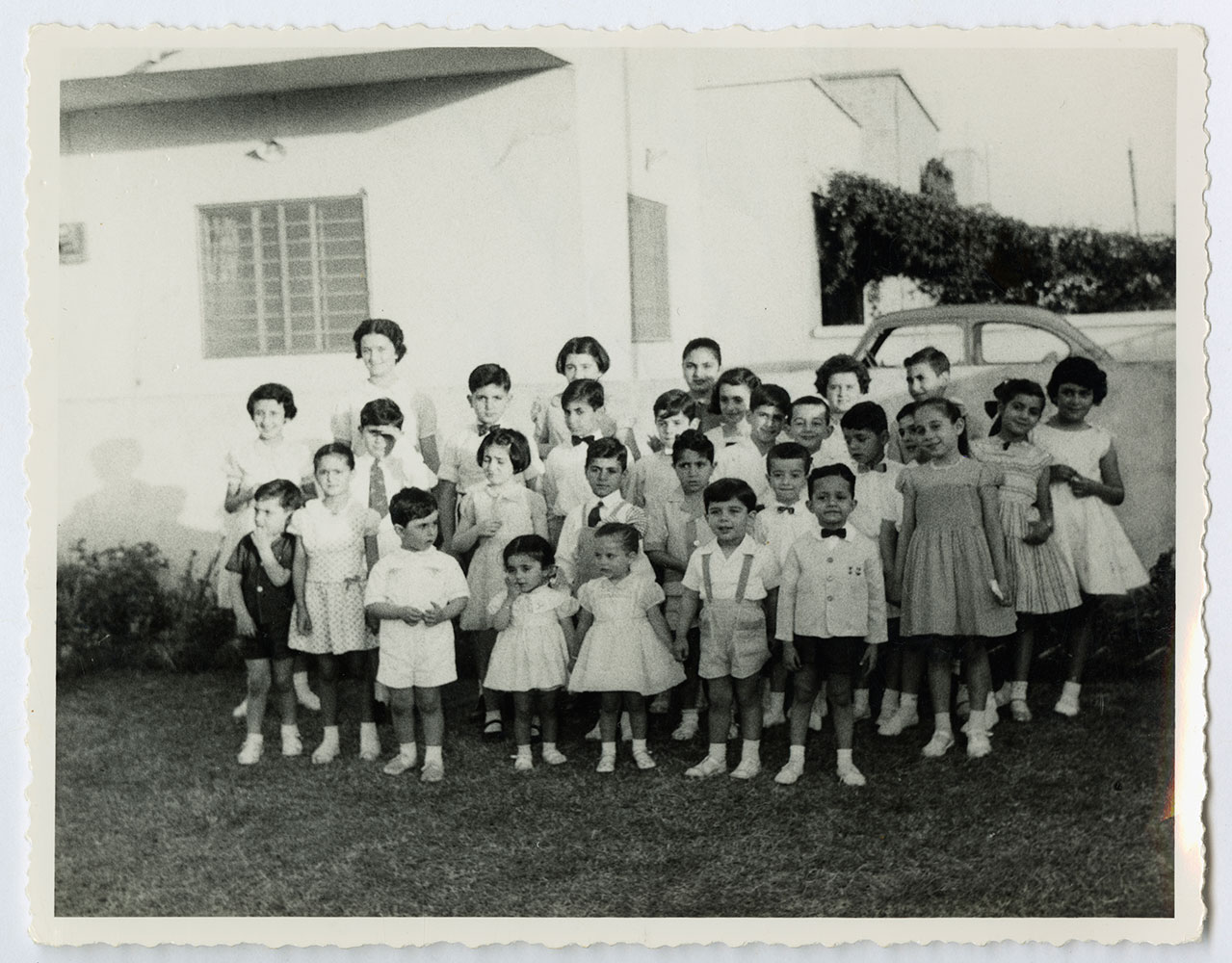
Children in a Jewish school in Baghdad, 1959

In the 14 July Revolution, the Hashemite monarchy were overthrown and numerous members of the royal family were killed brutally, creating a fear among the Iraqis. During the coup, Jews were subjected to violence. The Jews had their telephones cut off, Jewish government officials were fired and their homes were raided by the mobs. Most of the 15,000 Jews remained after Operation Ezra and Nehemiah. They stayed throughout the new Republic of Iraq. Conditions were improved and began to return normal during the era of Abdul-Karim Qasim, who took power in 1958. Qasim lifted restrictions on Jews. They were re-integrated into society. The Grand Rabbi pledged Qasim to protect the Jews, who fulfilled his promises.

Nevertheless, antisemitism increased during the rule of the Arif brothers (Abdul Salam Arif and Abdul Rahman Arif). With the rise of the Ba'ath Party to power in 1963, restrictions were placed on the remaining Iraqi Jews. Sale of property was banned, and Jews had to carry yellow identity cards. After the 1967 Six-Day War, Jewish property was expropriated, bank accounts were frozen, Jews were dismissed from public posts, their businesses were closed, trading permits owned by Jews were cancelled, they were not allowed to use telephones, they were placed under house arrest for extended periods of time, and were under constant surveillance and restricted to the cities.

== Ba'athist Iraq ==
=== Early persecution ===
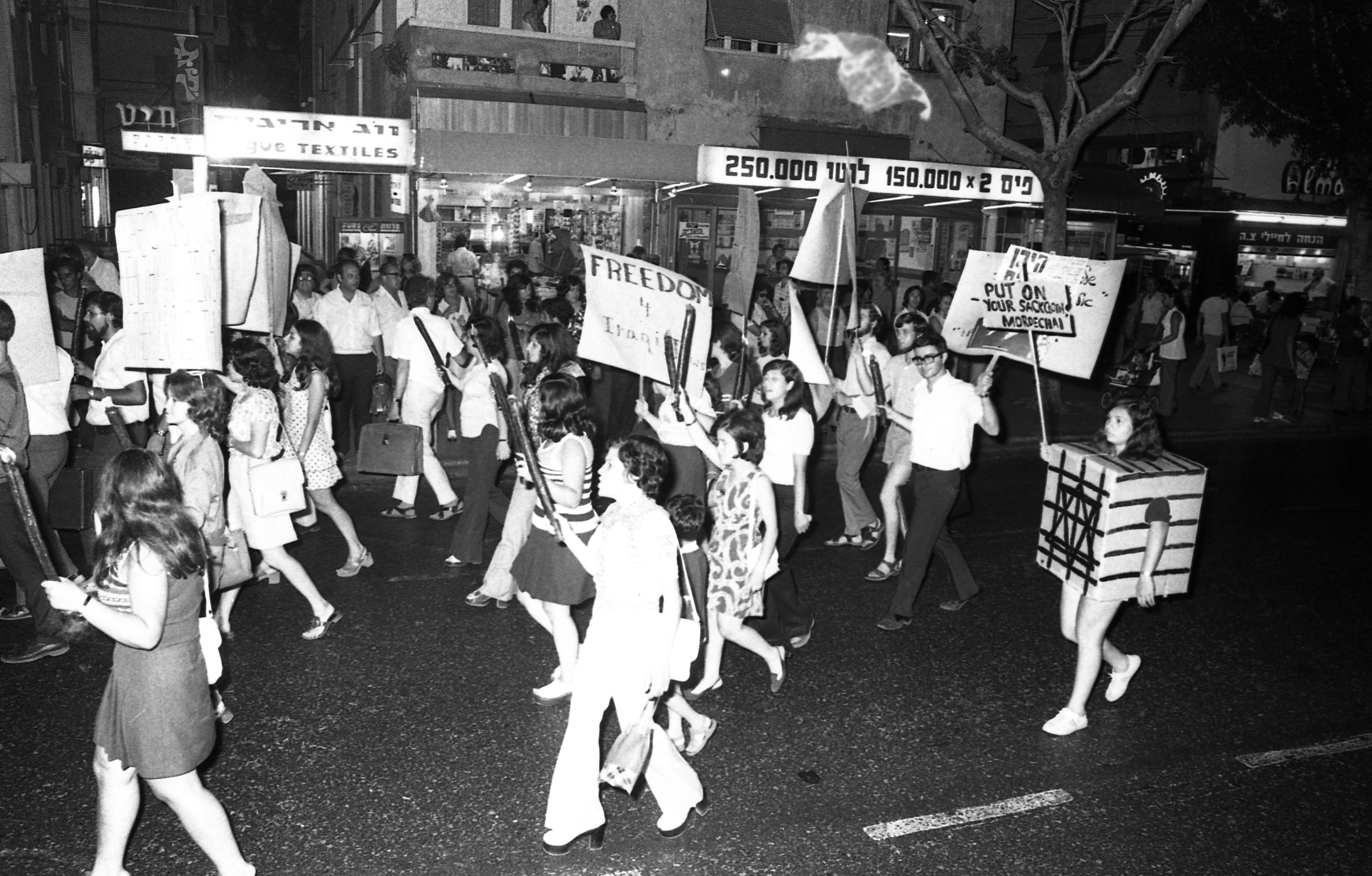
Israelis demonstrating against the persecution of Jews in Syria and Iraq, 1973

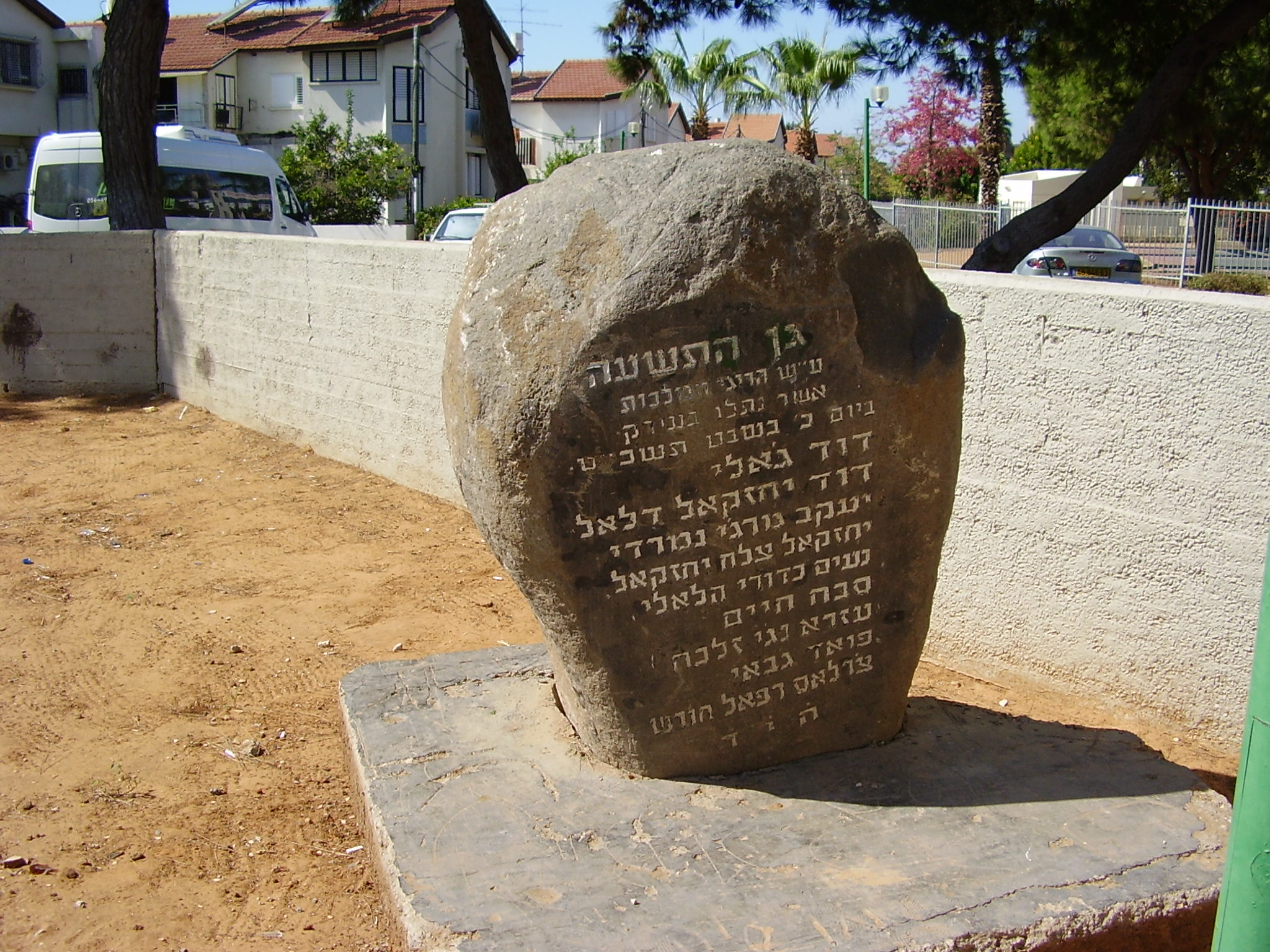
Memorial in Or Yehuda, Israel to Jews executed in 1969

In late 1968, scores of Jews were jailed on charges of spying for Israel, culminating in the 1969 public hanging of 14 men and boys, 9 of them Jews, and one of them a boy with a Muslim mother and a Jewish father, who were accused of spying for Israel. Other suspected spies for Israel died under torture. After Baghdad Radio invited Iraqi citizens to "come and enjoy the feast", half a million people paraded and danced past the scaffolds where the men were hanged, which resulted in international criticism. A Jew who later left wrote that the stress of persecution caused ulcers, heart attacks, and breakdowns to become increasingly prevalent in the Jewish community.

A further 18 Jews were hanged in secret from 1970 to 1972. In 1971, Amnesty International reported that at least 36 Jews were prisoners of conscience in Iraq, that most of Iraq's Jews lived in fear and under economic pressure and were not allowed to leave the country. In 1973, 23 Jews were murdered in Iraq, including five members of a single Jewish family. Repressive policies were enforced again. Passports were taken away and travel was restricted.

As a result, Jews escaped the country by traveling to Iraqi Kurdistan and then slipping into Iran with the help of Kurdish smugglers. From there many emigrated to Israel while some also moved to other countries such as the United Kingdom and Australia. In the early 1970s, bowing to international pressure and having concluded that its emigration ban was useless, the government allowed Jewish emigration and most of the remaining Jews left. (Note: Not shown on the map as maritime borders are not displayed "The situation of the remaining 6,000 Jews became increasingly precarious. Many were arrested on charges of spying for Israel, nine being sentenced to death and hanged publicly for this alleged offense".) The majority of those who stayed behind were elderly, and the community was subsequently pressured by the government to turn over $200 million worth of Jewish community property without compensation. (Note: "In 1969, Saddam and his mentor, al-Bakr, staged a show-trial of nine Jewish Iraqis who were later hanged in public for 'spying for Israel'".) (Note: "."A show trial culminated in the public hanging of twelve Jews on fabricated charges of spying for Israel in January 1969")

Only a few synagogues continued to function in Iraq, "a crumbling buildings tucked away in an alleyway" in Bataween, once Baghdad's main upscale Jewish neighborhood. Saddam helped in restoration of Meir Taweig Synagogue and construction Al-Habibiyah Jewish Cemetery. The Jews were allowed to visit and practice their rituals at religious sites revered by Muslims and Christians, such as Ezekiel's Tomb, Ezra's Tomb, Prophet Nahum Shrine, Tomb of Rabbi Joshua and Tomb of Daniel, all of which were preserved. The Administrative Committee was attached to the Ministry of Religious Endowments (Awqaf).

Under the orders of Saddam, a Jewish representative was appointed by the government, who was Naji Salman Salih. The Jews had their old businesses back, mainly in the Import and export trade and factories, and held respectable jobs and civil servants. Jewish merchants and traders were active in Shorja and Daniel Market and had their own cultural center in Baghdad. Some of the well-known doctors, officers and engineers in government, public universities and government hospitals were Jews, such as Shaul Sassoon, Eliyahu Basra, and Jack Abboud Shabi. Ibrahim Hesqel, a Jewish chemist was sent by the government on a trade mission to China in 1988. Few notable figures remained such as Salima Pasha and Sultana Yossef. Other popular Jewish figures included writer and poet Maliha Ishaq and singer and dancer Laila.

A committee was formed in 1973 by the Revolutionary Command Council, to oversee the endowed properties of Ezra Menachem Daniel located in Baghdad. They were tasked with managing these properties and allocating the revenues according to the endower's directives, focusing on supporting the poor and establishing various charitable, health, cultural, and vocational institutions. Incomes from former synagogues and hospitals supported charitable causes. During the 1980s, the United States pressured Saddam to adopt further measures to protect Jews. A department within the Ministry of National Security was set up to ensure their safety. During the Iran–Iraq War, Iran targeted areas near Jews in Baghdad with rockets and prompted Jews from Basra to relocate to Baghdad. After the war, some returned, while others moved abroad, occasionally visiting Iraq for family or financial reasons.

=== Later ===
Immediately prior to the Gulf War, the United States Department of State noted that there was no recent evidence of overt persecution of Jews. That said, international travel, particularly to Israel, was restricted, as was contact with Jewish groups abroad. In 1997, the Jerusalem Post reported that in the previous five years, some 75 Jews had fled Iraq, of whom about 20 moved to Israel and the rest mostly went to the United Kingdom and Netherlands. During Rosh Hashanah, a UN official visiting Baghdad filmed the Rosh Hashanah service at the synagogue. The only Ordained Rabbi died in 1996, and last kosher slaughterer (Shochet), emigrated in 2002. At this point, 500 to 1,000 Jews remained. In 2003, Emad Levy emerged as the leader of the Jewish community of Iraq. He functioned as the country's sole rabbi, kosher slaughterer, and advisor regarding Jewish issues.

According to the Jewish Virtual Library, the last Jewish wedding in Iraq took place in 1978; the last Brit Milah in 1984. In 1998, a Palestinian killed four people, including two Jews, at a community center, but the attacker was arrested and executed in 1999. This was the first time quick action was taken against crimes targeting Jews. Saddam ensured that the remaining Jews would not be harmed. He also said, "Anyone who hurts the Jews in Baghdad will pay a heavy price."

In 2001, Saddam Hussein ordered security services to identify all Jews remaining in Iraq, along with those born Jewish who converted to Islam and Christianity. Their investigation identified 39 Jews, the majority of whom—36 individuals—resided in Baghdad. Possibly there are more Jews, but hidden or distanced from reports. The report also noted approximately 220 people who had been born Jewish but later converted to Islam, as well as three who had converted to Christianity. The government was particularly alarmed by around 140 of these converts living in Northern Iraq, an area that had functioned autonomously since the conclusion of the Gulf War in 1991. Concerns arose because some of these individuals were reportedly leaving Islam to return to Judaism, with some even traveling between Northern Iraq and Israel.

According to Rabbi Emad Levy, "The lives of the Jews were good and the regime did not mess with us.". Jewish children had Muslim and Christian friends, relations with them were positive, and Jews lived alongside them as neighbors. Kosher food was available, with Jews having their own butchers. Ordinary life of Jews continued with a mix of caution, routine, and limited joy. They could go about their daily activities—work, socializing in private settings like swimming pools and reading books—without overt interference from the government. However, this "ordinary" life was far from carefree. Interactions with foreigners, particularly Israelis, were restricted. The government viewed foreigners with suspicion, and Levy avoided synagogues when foreigners visited, fearing they might be government agents. The years of sanctions, attacks and wars and conflict brought people of all religions and sects closer together. The Jews, like Christians and Muslims, became more religious.

== Post-Saddam period: 2003—present ==
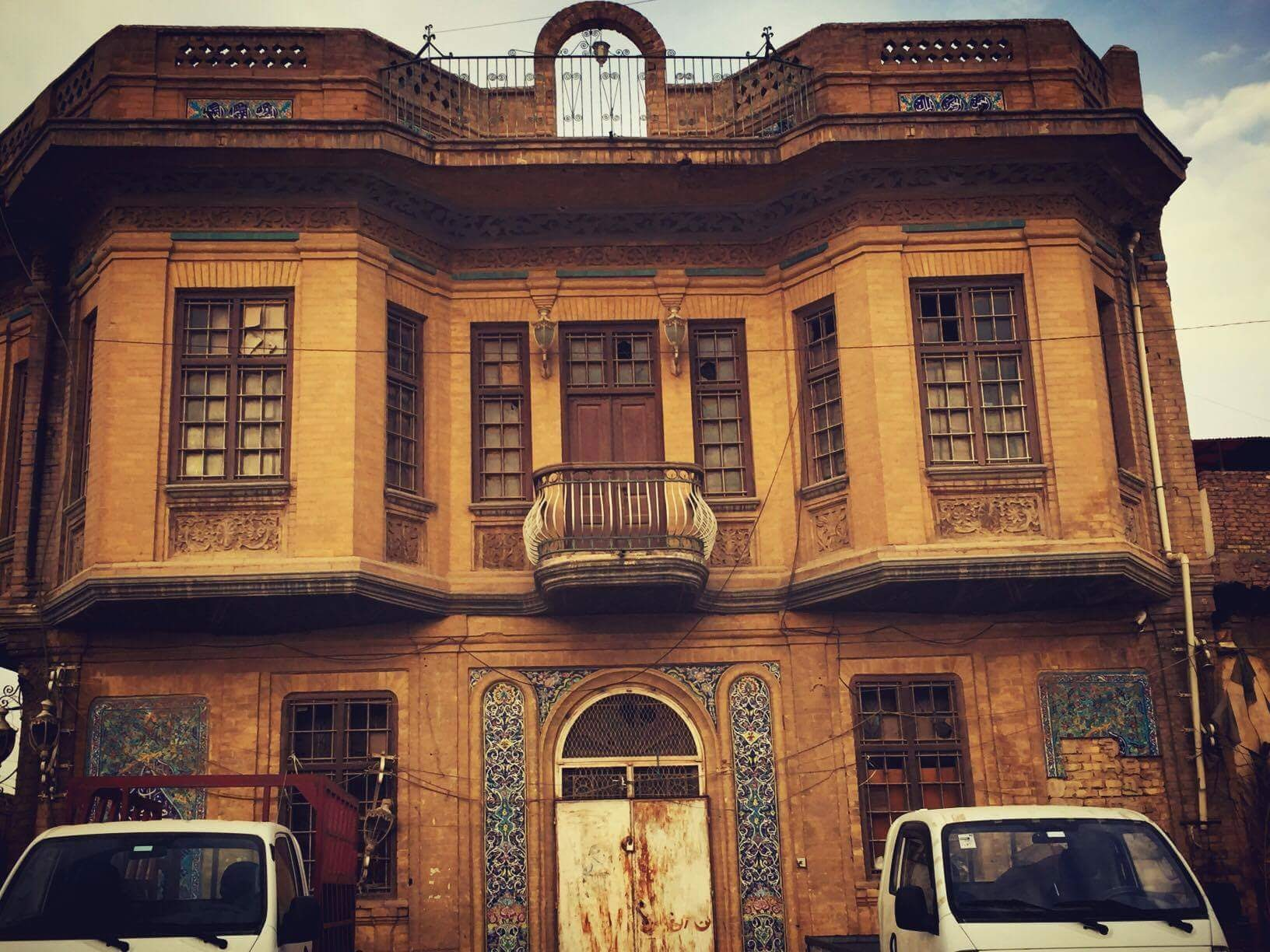
House of Sassoon Eskell, former finance minister of Iraq, in Baghdad

The last active synagogue closed a few weeks before the 2003 invasion of Iraq. The coalition forces bombed intelligence headquarters and founded Iraqi Jewish Archive. In the war's aftermath, the Jewish Agency attempted to locate all remaining Iraqi Jews and offer them the opportunity to emigrate to Israel. The agency identified 34 Jews in Baghdad, half of whom were over the age of 70. However, possibly there were more. While generally impoverished, some of the community members were middle class, such as two doctors. Ultimately, six Iraqi Jews chose to emigrate; among them was Ezra Levy, Emad Levy's father. After the Ba'ath Party fell, the process of establishing a new democratic government began. During deliberations over the Iraqi constitution, lawmakers debated whether Jews should be considered a minority group or left out of the constitution altogether. During the process, Israeli author Sami Michael was also invited to write the new constitution of Iraq.

In 2003, a mass of documents, manuscripts, books and ephemera belonging to the Jewish community was discovered in the basement of the headquarters of the Mukhabarat (secret police) and removed to the US for preservation.

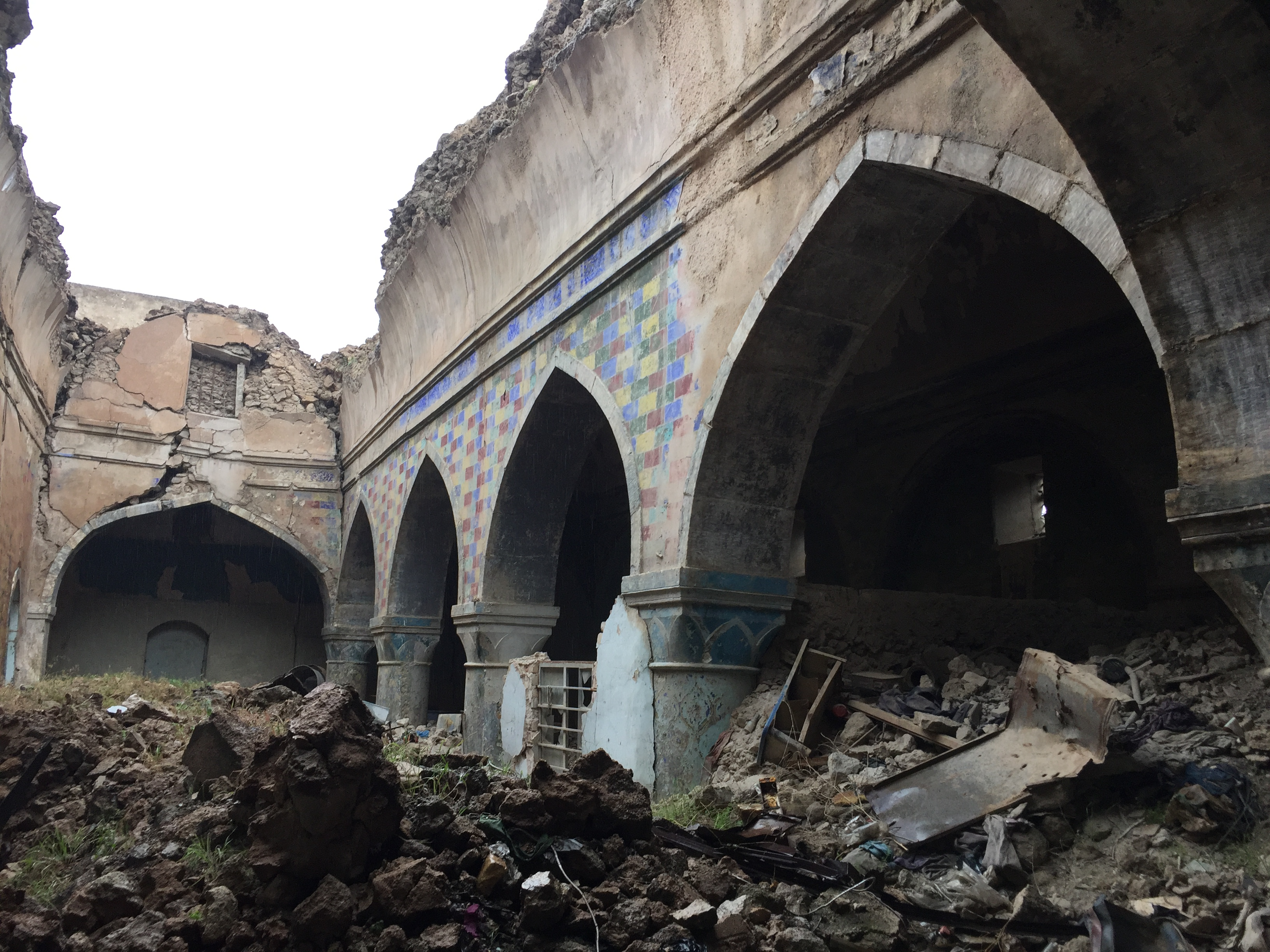
Ruined Sassoon Synagogue in Mosul

In October 2006, Rabbi Emad Levy announced that he planned to move to Israel. He compared the Jewish experience in Iraq to "living in a prison," reporting that most Jews stayed in their homes "out of fear of kidnapping or execution" amid ongoing sectarian violence. Despite numerous death threats, Levy remained in Iraq for four more years. He moved to Israel in 2010, subsequently marrying and starting a family.

In 2011, Wikileaks published the names of seven remaining Jews in Baghdad, and their names were reprinted in Iraqi newspapers, putting them at risk.

In 2018, a poll by the popular Facebook page Al-Khuwwa al-Nathifa (‘The Clean Brotherhood,’ over 1.7 million followers) recently showed that 77% of 62,000 respondents were in favor of the return of Jewish Iraqis. In 2021 only three Jews remained in Iraq.

In 2021, a conference in Erbil called for Iraq’s Jews to return, and at the same time, demanded the Iraqi government recognise Israel and make peace with it. In response, the Iraqi government condemned the conference, issued arrests for several participants and speakers and threatened to arrest all 300 participants. Several backtracked from their previous statements.

In 2022, the Iraqi parliament voted to make it a death penalty offence to have any ties with Israel.

In June 2025 the descendents of Jews who owned land in Iraq upon which the Embassy of France building stands have sued France for not paying rent on the land since 1967 [the Ba’ath party came to power in Iraq and demanded that France pay rent directly to the Iraqi treasury. The building had been sequestered.

On the weekend of Oct. 31, 2026, the former Shamash Jewish School on Al-Rashid Street in Baghdad reopened as the Shamash Jewish Museum, operating under the auspices of the Administrative Committee for Iraqi Jews.

== Iraqi Jews ==
- Many Tannaim and Amoraim, including:
  - Abba Arika, "Rabh", amora
  - Shmuel Yarchina'ah, "Mar Samuel", or Samuel of Nehardea, amora
  - Rav Huna
  - Rav Chisda
  - Abaye, amora
  - Rav Papa, amora
  - Rav Ashi (Abana), rav, amora
- Anan ben David, founder of Qara'ism
- Alan Yentob, television executive and broadcaster
- Salima Murad, singer
- Marina Benjamin, writer
- Avi Shlaim, Oxford Professor
- Binyamin Ben-Eliezer, politician
- Dodai ben Nahman, scholar
- Shlomo Hillel, diplomat and politician
- Ya'qub Bilbul, poet
- Samantha Ellis, writer
- Sir Sassoon Eskell, statesman and financier
- Marcus Samuel, 1st Viscount Bearsted, Lord Mayor of London and businessman
- Naeim Giladi, writer
- Sir Naim Dangoor, entrepreneur and philanthropist
- N.J. Dawood, translator (best known for his translation of the Koran)
- Hakham Yosef Chayyim of Baghdad, "Ben Ish Chai"
- Yitzchak Kadouri, rabbi and kabbalist
- Yitzhak Yamin, painter and sculptor
- Ran Cohen, Israeli politician
- Hila Klein, member of YouTube channel h3h3Productions. The Klein family is of mixed Libyan, Iraqi Jewish and Ashkenazi heritage.
- Elie Kedourie, historian
- Sylvia Kedourie, historian
- Jessica Meir, astronaut and physiologist
- Sami Michael^{*}, writer
- Shafiq Ades, wealthy businessman
- Samuel Hayek
- Samir Naqqash, novelist
- Selim Zilkha, entrepreneur
- Maurice & Charles Saatchi, advertising executives
- Yona Sabar, scholar, linguist, and researcher
- David Sassoon, merchant, and the Sassoon family
- Yaakov Chaim Sofer, rabbi
- Ovadia Yosef, rabbi

== See also ==
- Antisemitism in the Arab world
- Antisemitism in Islam
- Baghdad Jewish Arabic
- Baghdadi Jews (Jews of Iraqi origin who are now resident in India and Pakistan)
- Barzani Jewish Neo-Aramaic
- Freedom of religion in Iraq
- History of the Jews under Muslim rule
- Iraqi Jewish Archive
- Iraqi Jews in Israel
- Islamic–Jewish relations
- Jewish Babylonian Aramaic
- Jewish exodus from the Muslim world
- Judeo-Iraqi Arabic
- Lishana Deni
- Lishanid Noshan
- List of Jews from Iraq
- List of Jewish sites in Iraq
- Mandaeans
- Music of Iraq
- Operation Ezra and Nehemiah
- Racism in the Arab world
- Racism in Muslim communities
- Religion in Iraq
- Sassoon family
- Xenophobia and racism in the Middle East

== Bibliography ==
- Bard, Mitchell (2013). "The Jews of Iraq". Jewish Virtual Library.
- Gale, Naomi (2005). The Sephardim of Sydney: Coping with Political Processes and Social Pressures (2005 ed.). Sussex Academic Press. ISBN 9781845190354. – Total pages: 188
- Gat, Moshe (May 1, 1997), The Jewish Exodus from Iraq, 1948–1951, Routledge, ISBN 978-0-7146-4689-3
- Kalpakian, Jack (2004). Identity, Conflict and Cooperation in International River Systems (2004 ed.). Ashgate Publishing. ISBN 9780754633389. – Total pages: 213
- Levin, Itamar (2001). Locked Doors: The Seizure of Jewish Property in Arab Countries (2001 ed.). Greenwood Publishing Group. ISBN 9780275971342. – Total pages: 265
- Murphy, Verity (July 29, 2003). "Iraq Jews' spiritual move to Israel". BBC News.
- Rejwan, Nissim; Beinin, Joel (2010). The Last Jews in Baghdad: Remembering a Lost Homeland (2010 ed.). University of Texas Press. ISBN 9780292774421. – Total pages: 242
- Simon, Reeva S.; Laskier, Michael Menachem; Reguer, Sara (2013). The Jews of the Middle East and North Africa in Modern Times (2013 ed.). Columbia University Press. ISBN 9780231507592. – Total pages: 432

== Further viewing ==
=== Films ===
- 2002 – Forget Baghdad: Jews and Arabs – The Iraqi Connection. Directed by Samir.
- 2005 – The Forgotten Refugees
- 2007 – Baghdad Twist. Directed by Joe Balass.
- 2013 – Farewell Baghdad. Directed by Nissim Dayan.
- 2014 – Shadow in Baghdad. Directed by Duki Dror.
