= Aharon Geva Kleinberger =

Aharon Geva-Kleinberger
- אהרון גבע קלינברגר
- Born: 1963 (age 62–63)
- Known for: Documentation of endangered Jewish Arabic dialects

Academic background
- Education: University of Erlangen–Nuremberg
- Doctoral advisor: Otto Jastrow

Academic work
- Institutions: University of Haifa

Aharon Geva-Kleinberger (Hebrew: אַהֲרֹן גבע קלינברגר; born 1963) is an Israeli linguist and Full Professor in the Department of Hebrew Language at the University of Haifa, specializing in Arabic dialectology. His research focuses on endangered Arabic dialects spoken by Jewish communities across the Middle East, North Africa, and Asia, as well as Galilean and Judeo-Galilean Arabic dialects of northern Israel.

== Early life and education ==
Geva-Kleinberger was born in 1963. He completed his doctoral studies at the University of Erlangen-Nuremberg under the supervision of Otto Jastrow, with additional studies in Islamic Studies and Assyriology.

== Academic career ==
Between 2014 and 2019, he served two consecutive terms as Chair of the Department of Arabic Language and Literature at the University of Haifa. He currently teaches dialectology and Semitic languages within the Department of Hebrew Language at the University of Haifa. Since October 2025, he has held the Joseph & Racheline Barda Chair for the Study and Research of Jewish Heritage in Egypt.

== Research ==
=== Galilean and endangered Jewish Arabic dialects ===
Geva-Kleinberger's fieldwork focuses primarily on Galilean Arabic and Judeo-Galilean Arabic, which was still spoken in the 20th century. He also documents endangered Arabic dialects of Jewish communities originating from Arab countries, including Syria, Lebanon, Sudan, Egypt, and Yemen, as well as Judeo-Iraqi dialects in the Far East (India, Singapore, and Myanmar).

=== Multidisciplinary approach ===
Geva-Kleinberger's approach is macro-linguistic, viewing language as a living record of history, culture, and heritage. This perspective is reflected in his multidisciplinary research, where language serves as a toolkit that enhances the understanding of diverse fields such as ethnobotany, agriculture, geology, and archaeology.
