= Judeo-Iraqi Arabic =

Judeo-Arabic variety of Iraqi Jews

- Iraqi Judeo-Arabic; Yahudic
- Native to: Iraq, Israel
- Native speakers: (97,000 cited 1992–2018)
- Language family: Afro-Asiatic: Semitic; Central Semitic; North Arabian; Arabic; Mesopotamian; Qeltu; Judeo-Iraqi Arabic
- Dialects: Baghdadi Judeo-Arabic
- Writing system: Arabic alphabet Hebrew alphabet

Language codes
- ISO 639-3: yhd
- Glottolog: jude1266
- ELP: Judeo-Iraqi Arabic

Judeo-Iraqi Arabic (Arabic: عربية يهودية عراقية, romanized: ʻArabīyah Yahūdīyah ʻIrāqīyah, Hebrew: ערבית-יהודית עיראקית, romanized: ʻAravit Yehudit ʻIraqit), also known as Iraqi Judeo-Arabic and Baghdadi Judeo-Arabic, is a variety of Arabic spoken by Iraqi Jews.

== History ==
The language originated among Jews living in various regions of Iraq. With the migration of Iraqi Jews to other countries, the language spread to those new locations, mainly Israel, the US, the UK, Canada and Australia.

In Israel, the language was widely used among Jews who emigrated from Iraq, and to this day, many Israelis, including those whose parents emigrated from Iraq, continue to use it.

The language was also used in the Baghdadi community in India and other communities of Jewish Iraqi immigrants in the far east.

In 1992, there were 120 Judeo-Iraqi Arabic speakers remaining in Iraq. In 2018, there were 94,000 speakers of the language in Israel. The best known variety is Baghdadi Judeo-Arabic, although other dialects were spoken in Mosul and elsewhere.

The vast majority of Iraqi Jews have relocated to Israel and switched to Modern Hebrew as their first language.

The 2014 film Farewell Baghdad is mostly in the Baghdad dialect. It was the first movie filmed in Baghdadi Judeo-Arabic.

The language is being taught at the Oxford School of Rare Jewish Languages, by Dr Assaf Bar Moshe, whose family emigrated to Israel from Iraq and who speaks it as his mother tongue. His textbook Baghdadi Judeo-Arabic, an introductory text is available as an open source textbook.

Iraqi Jewish author Samantha Ellis wrote a book about Judeo-Iraqi Arabic, her mother tongue, called Chopping Onions on my Heart (in the UK) and Always Carry Salt (in the US) which was shortlisted for the Wingate Prize.

== Sample text ==
Judeo-Iraqi Arabic	Transliteration	English
יא אבאנא אלדי פי אלסמואת, יתׄקדס אסמך, תׄאתׄי מלכותׄך, תׄכון משיתך כמא פי אלסמא ועלי אלארץ, חבזנא אלדי ללעד אעטנא אליום, ואעפר לנא מא עלינו כמא נעפר נחן למן לנא עליה, ולא תׄדחלנא אלתׄגארב, לכן נגנא מן אלשריר, לאן לך למלך ואלקות ואלמגד אלי אלאבד	Yā abānā illedī fī al-samwāti, yaṯaqaddasu asmuka, ṯāṯī malakūṯuka, ṯakūnu mašyatuka kamā fī al-samā waʕalay al-ārṣi, ḥubzanāʔ al-ladī liluʕadi aʕṭinā al-yawma. Wāǧfir lanā mā ʕalaynū kamā naǧfiru naḥnu liman lanā ʕalayhi, walā ṯudḥilnāʔ al-ṯṯagāriba, lakin nagginā mina al-šširīri, lanna laka lamluka wālquqata wālmagida alay al-abdi.	Our father, which art in heaven, hallowed be thy name, thy kingdom come, thy will be done on earth as it is in heaven, give us this day our daily bread, and forgive us our debts, as we forgive our debtors, and lead us not into temptation, but deliver us from evil, for thine is the kingdom and the power and the glory for ever and ever.
