= Nahum the Mede =

First century rabbinical authority

Nahum the Mede (Hebrew: נחום המדי, transliteration: Nahum HaMadi) was a first-century tanna of the first generation who came to the Land of Israel from Media. He lived in Jerusalem and according to Nathan the Babylonian, he was one of the three most renowned criminal judges in the city. He was one of the seven great contemporaries of Johanan ben Zakai who had survived the destruction of Jerusalem by the Romans and who probably became members of the Sanhedrin at Yavne.

== Rulings ==
Only six of his laws have been preserved in the Babylonian Talmud, three of which were said not to have been recognized. Some, however, attribute to him four other and anonymous teachings. The opposition to the decisions of Nahum, according to the view of a later amoraim, seems to have been due to the dislike of the scholars of the Land of Israel for those of other countries.

Nahum's teachings include:

- "Nahum the Mede says one may use melted tallow for the Sabbath lamp, and the sages prohibit it."
- "If a man sold an ass, he has not sold its trappings, but Nahum the Mede says he has sold the trappings."

Jacob Neusner holds that there is no evidence that Nahum came from Parthia or was in fact a Medean, because the suffix "the Medean" may be indicative of the origins of his family before him.

15th-century scholar Abraham Zacuto in his Sefer Yuchasin (1498) speculates that mention of a certain "Nahum the Elder" in the Baraita refers to Nahum the Mede.

== Sources ==
Jewish Encyclopedia bibliography: Grätz, Gesch, iv. 22; Frankel, Darke ha-Mishna, p. 63, Leipsic. 1859.E. C.
