= Ya'qub Bilbul =

Iraqi Jewish writer

- Born: يعقوب بلبل; 1920; Baghdad, Iraq
- Died: 2003 (aged 82–83); Israel
- Occupations: Novelist, short story writer
- Writing career
- Genres: Fictional prose, Social realism

Ya'qub Bilbul (Arabic: يعقوب بلبل, Hebrew: יעקב (בלבול) לב, also transliterated Jacob Bilbul and Ya'coub Balbul; 1920–2003) was an Iraqi Jewish writer. His literary works were published in Arabic, and he achieved recognition as early as 1936 after publishing an article in the Iraqi journal, Al-Hatif. Known for his naturalistic stories, he is considered one of the first writers of social realist fiction in Iraq, and a pioneer of the Iraqi novel and short story.

== Education ==
Bilbul studied in English at the Shammash and Alliance schools in Iraq. He graduated in 1938 and continued on to study economics and business. After emigrating to Israel in 1951, he majored in law and economics at the University of Tel Aviv, graduating from there some five later.

== Career ==
In 1938, Bilbul released his first collection of short stories. Entitled Al-Jamrah al-Ūla ("The first coal"), he described it as the only belletristic book published in Iraq that year. In the introduction to the book, he writes of his desire for, "Iraq to unfurl the banner of literature," a statement interpreted by Nancy Berg as a declaration of his intent to form part of the Arab literary renaissance (known as the nahda).

Bilbul worked as a clerk in the Baghdad Chamber of Commerce, whose president between 1938 and 1945 was another poet, Meir Basri. He and Basri revived the muwashshahat, strophic forms of poetry that were popular in Andalusia. Between 1945 and 1951, Bilbul edited the Chamber's monthly journal and wrote its annual report. He wrote literary articles, as well as articles on economics and business which were published in Iraq and Egypt. Both Basri and Bilbul also wrote Shakespearean sonnets.

One of Bilbul's most popular short stories was Sura Tibq al-Asl, which is included in many anthologies. Expressive of the school of social realism, of which he was considered a pioneer, it tells the story of a midwife called to confirm the pregnancy of a young woman who is then murdered by her brother to restore the family's honor. The story is critical of the traditional practice of honor killings. It is the only story known to have been subject to pre-publication editing in Iraq, where such a practice was wholly uncommon. After two Muslim brothers who worked at the printing press expressed being offended by the assigning of obviously Muslim names to the two primitive and cruel characters in the book, while the midwife was given a common Jewish name, Bilbul changed all the names to more neutral ones to please his friends.

Reflective of his desire to present authentic accounts and to reach the masses, much of the dialogue in Bilbul's stories was written in colloquial Arabic. Praised for his short-story technique, focus and unity, and social realism, he was also criticized for naivete, lack of originality, and weakness in characterization. He is nevertheless cited as one of the 21 most important novel and short story writers from the period between 1920 and 1955.

Like other Jewish writers in Iraq in the 1930s and 1940s, his literary works were targeted toward a wide audience, were influenced by both Western and Islamic traditions, and he wrote not as a Jew, but as an Iraqi. He continued to write in Arabic after his emigration to Israel in 1951.

== Bibliography ==
- Bashkin, Orit (2008). The other Iraq: pluralism and culture in Hashemite Iraq (Illustrated ed.). Stanford University Press. ISBN 978-0-8047-5992-2.copy
- Berg, Nancy E. (1996). Exile from exile: Israeli writers from Iraq. SUNY Press. ISBN 978-0-7914-2979-2.
- Clark, Peter (2006). Suleiman, Yasir; Muhawi, Ibrahim (eds.). Literature and nation in the Middle East (Illustrated ed.). Edinburgh University Press. ISBN 978-0-7486-2073-9.
- Ghareeb, Edmund; Dougherty, Beth (2004). Historical dictionary of Iraq (Illustrated ed.). Scarecrow Press. ISBN 978-0-8108-4330-1.
- Giladi, G. N. (1990). Discord in Zion: conflict between Ashkenazi & Sephardi Jews in Israel. Scorpion Publishing. ISBN 978-0-905906-87-4.
- Moreh, Shmuel (1988). Studies in modern Arabic prose and poetry (Illustrated ed.). BRILL. ISBN 978-90-04-08359-2.
- Rejwan, Nissim (2004). The last Jews in Baghdad: remembering a lost homeland. University of Texas Press. ISBN 978-0-292-70293-6.
