= Samantha Ellis =

British playwright and writer

- Born: London, England
- Education: Queens' College, Cambridge
- Occupations: Playwright and writer
- Awards: Runner-up for the National Student Drama Festival Playwriting Award 1996 for The Candy Jar. Shortlisted for the Wingate Award for Chopping Onions on my Heart
- Website: samanthaellis.me.uk

Samantha Ellis is a British playwright and writer best known for her book How to Be a Heroine, her play How to Date a Feminist, and her book Chopping Onions on My Heart, published in the US under the title Always Carry Salt. and shortlisted for the Wingate Award.

== Early life ==
Ellis was born in London, England, to Iraqi-Jewish parents. She studied English at Queens' College, Cambridge.

== Career and works ==
Ellis's play The Candy Jar was produced at the Edinburgh Fringe in 1996. It was the runner-up for the 1996 National Student Drama Award for Playwriting. She worked as a journalist, and wrote a column on theatrical history for The Guardian newspaper.

Her play Patching Havoc was produced at Theatre503 in 2003. Her radio play Sugar and Snow, set in the Kurdish community in north London, was produced on BBC Radio 4 in 2006 and given a reading at the Hampstead Theatre. Her short play A Sudden Visitation of Calamity was produced at Menagerie Theatre in 2008. In 2010 her play The Thousand and Second Night was produced by LAMDA. In 2010, her play Cling to Me Like Ivy, published by Nick Hern Books, was produced by the Birmingham Repertory Theatre and went on tour. In 2012, she was a founder member of women's theatre company Agent 160.

Her book How to be a Heroine was published by Chatto & Windus in January 2014; and her biography of Anne Brontë, Take Courage: Anne Bronte and the Art of Life was published in January 2017. In the same years, Ellis worked on the screenplays of Paddington and Paddington 2. In 2016, her play How to Date a Feminist was produced at the Arcola Theatre. The Evening Standard called it "witty, slyly provocative and simply downright lovely" and Exeunt called it "a whip-smart romp...wonderfully funny.". It has been produced several times in Germany, in Istanbul, Mexico City, Rome and other places

Her third book, Chopping Onions on My Heart, was published by Chatto & Windus in 2025. The Guardian called it "a linguistic feast", and The Observer called it "a gift to the future". It was published in the US under the title Always Carry Salt and called "an urgent and tender exploration of cultural extinction...an act of cultural rescue" by the Jewish Book Council

== Bibliography ==
Books

Chopping Onions on my Heart, Chatto & Windus, 2025, ISBN 9781784745028; published in the US as Always Carry Salt, Pegasus Books, 2026, ISBN 9798897100286

Take Courage: Anne Brontë and the Art of Life, Chatto & Windus, 2017, ISBN 9781784701116

How to be a Heroine, Chatto & Windus, 2014, ISBN 9780099575566

Plays

Cling to me Like Ivy, Nick Hern Books, 2010, ISBN 9781848420656

How to Date a Feminist, Nick Hern Books, 2016, ISBN 9781780018188

15 Heroines, Nick Hern Books, 2020, ISBN 9781788503532

Prefaces

Agnes Grey by Anne Brontë, Vintage Books, 2017, ISBN 9781784872397 A Lady and her Husband by Amber Reeves, Persephone Books, 2018, ISBN 9781910263068
