= Ezekiel's Tomb =

Tomb in al-Kifl, Iraq

- قبر ذو الكفل; قبر حزقيال
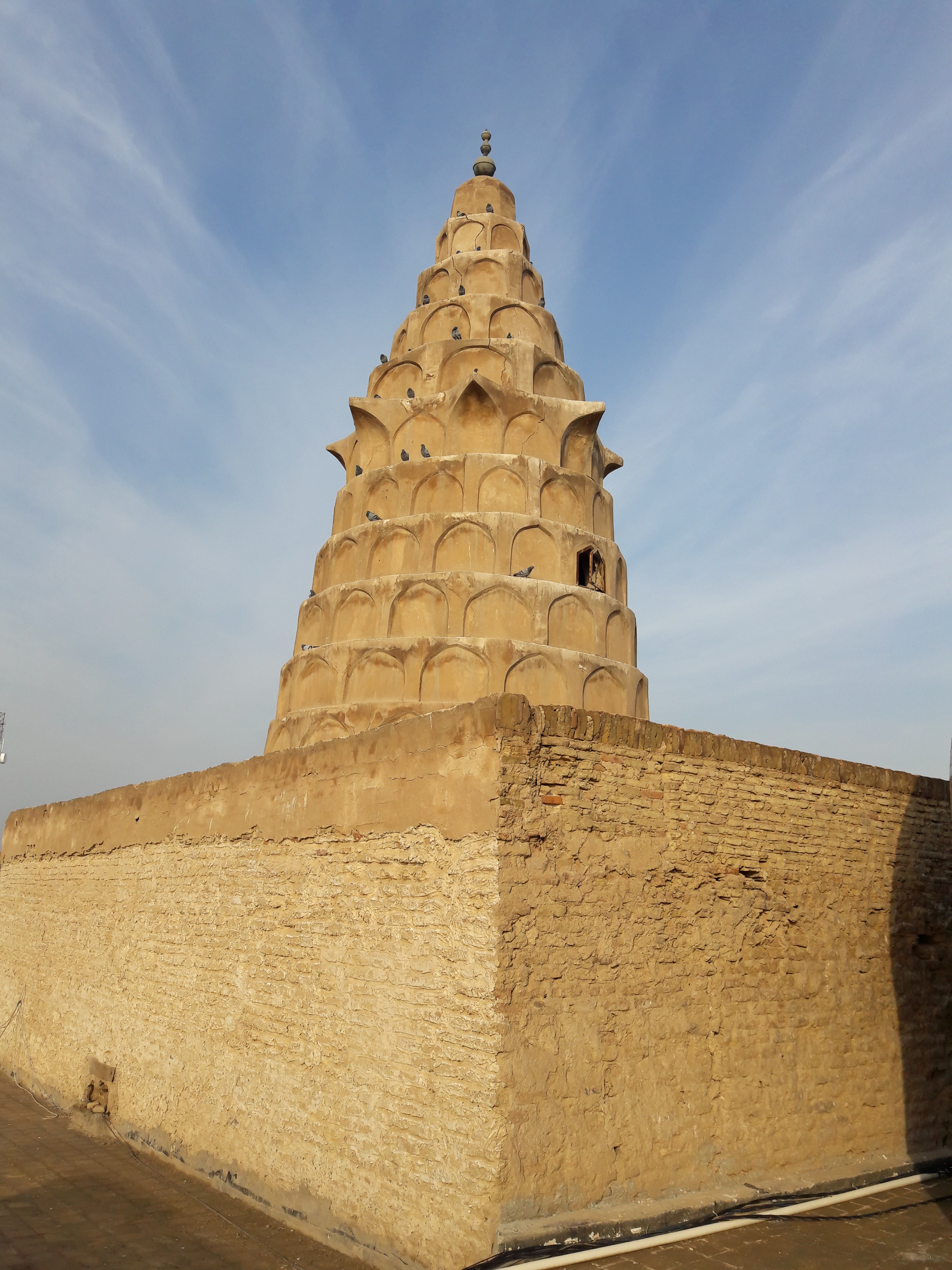
- The conical dome of the tomb

- Location of the tomb in Iraq

Religion
- Affiliation: Shia Islam (since 2003); Judaism (prior to 2003)
- Ecclesiastical or organisational status: Mausoleum
- Status: Active

Location
- Location: Al-Kifl
- Country: Iraq
- Interactive map of Ezekiel's Tomb
- Administration: Special Secretariat for the Shrine of the Prophet Dhel-Kifl and Annukhailiah Historical Mosque
- Coordinates: 32°13′36″N 44°22′02″E

Architecture
- Type: Muqarnas
- Established: 12th–14th century CE (current form); 2012–2014 (restoration)

Specifications
- Height (max): 17 m (56 ft)
- Spire: One: Ezekiel
- Site area: 54.06 m^{2} (581.9 sq ft)

Website
- alnukhailah.iq

Ezekiel's Tomb (Arabic: قبر ذو الكفل, romanized: Qabr Ḏū al-Kafal; Arabic: قبر حزقيال, romanized: Qabr Ḥizqiyāl) is a mausoleum, located next to the site of the Nukhailah Mosque, in al-Kifl, in the district of al-Hillah, in the province of Babylon, Iraq. The tomb is revered by Jews as the resting place of Ezekiel, an Israelite prophet who was deported from the Kingdom of Judah during the Babylonian captivity and serves as the eponymous protagonist of the Book of Ezekiel in the Hebrew Bible. Historically, it is the oldest and most important Jewish site in Mesopotamia.

The Jewish presence at Ezekiel's Tomb has greatly diminished since the Jewish exodus from Iraq in the 1950s, shortly after the beginning of the Arab–Israeli conflict. The larger complex has been extensively redeveloped since the 2003 invasion of Iraq; it is widely regarded by Muslims to be the resting place of Dhul-Kifl, an unknown Islamic prophet who is often identified with Ezekiel, and work was reportedly underway to convert the site's disused synagogue into part of the mosque.

== Historical background ==
=== Ancient sources ===
One of the oldest mentions of a tomb of Ezekiel occurs in the ancient apocryphal text known as Lives of the Prophets which recounts the lives of several Abrahamic prophets mentioned in the Old Testament. Among those is Ezekiel, who's mentioned to have been slain by an Israelite leader during exile due to the prophet rebuking him for worshipping idols and then buried in the "land of Chaldea". His burial area is described as a cave located in an area given the name Nahor. Also, according to the apocryphal, the cave also contained Shem's and Arpachshad's burials, ancestors of Abraham.

A tradition mentioned by Benjamin of Tudela recounts that Jeconiah, the former king of Judah, with the help of the Jews had built a settlement in the area after he was released from imprisonment by Amel-Marduk. Around this time, the Abrahamic prophet Ezekiel passed away and was buried in a cave named the "Cave of Eliyahu" (named after the Cave of Eliyahu) where Shem and Arpachshad were also claimed to have been buried. Benjamin also says that the tomb, including its dome, was built by Jeconiah upon Ezekiel's death.

According to the 8th-century rabbinical text Pirkei De-Rabbi Eliezer, Ezekiel was buried in Babylonia and mention of his tomb is first made by the 10th-century Jewish sage Sherira Gaon. The tomb, alongside the town its located in, was later mentioned by Abbasid Muslim scholar Yaqut al-Hamawi in his Kitāb Mu'jam al-Buldān, saying it was five hours away from Hillah. He noted that the town also contained the Nukhailah Mosque and that the tomb of Ezekiel also contained Baruch ben Neriah and other Jewish figures.

=== Under the Islamic Caliphates ===
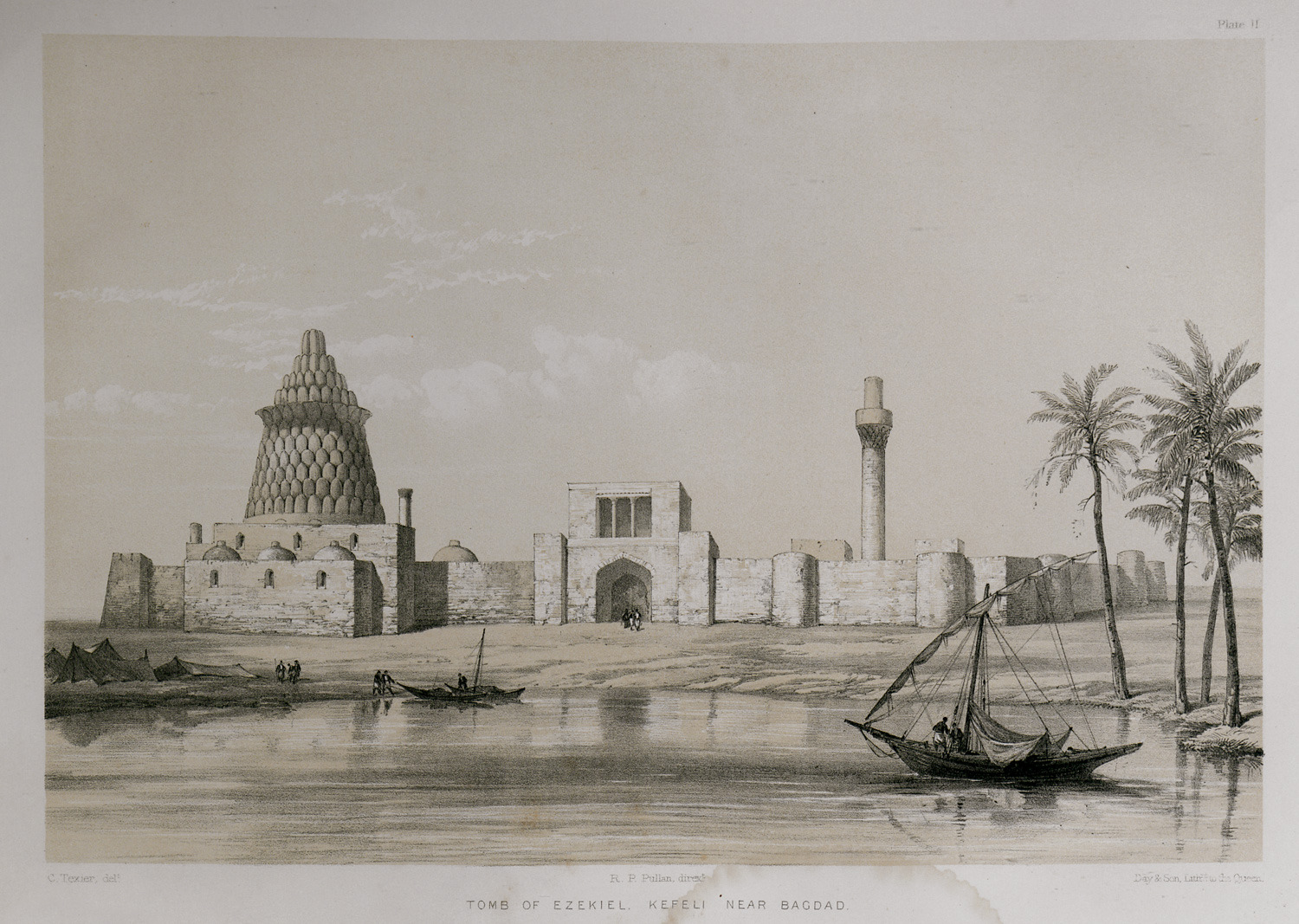
The exterior of the tomb of Ezekiel illustrated by Charles Texier in 1864.

The German-Jewish medieval explorer Petachiah reported in around 1180 that the Jews held the keys to the site and relates that between 60,000 and 80,000 Jews converged on the tomb during the week of Sukkot. He documents that the Abbasid Caliphs respected the site and that Arab merchants typically came to the town to sell their goods. He also noted pilgrims that came from Iraq and Iran, who stopped by for praying. He also stated that pilgrims to the site believed bringing votive deposits would give them children, and give them prolific animals to cultivate. Benjamin of Tudela mentioned that there were several synagogues at the location and noted that Muslim notables also frequented the site to pray.

Until the mid-20th century, over 5,000 Jews used to come to the tomb from Baghdad and other major cities during Passover. During this period, the tomb walls contained various inscriptions, including three poems honoring various donors. An adjoining room contained five tombs said to belong to five Rabbis who transmitted and wrote the Babylonian Talmud. Another room was referred to as "Cave of Eliyahu" and a third room contained the tombs belonging to Baghdad's prominent Daniel family, who were custodians of the site. A Hebrew plaque above the doorway dating from 1810 read:

This is the tomb of our master Ezekiel the Prophet, son of Buzi the Kohen, may his merit shield us and all Israel. Amen.

==== Ownership dispute ====
By the time of Ottoman imperial rule, the significance had faded. The diminishing of its importance also led Turkish inhabitants to disagree with the inhabitants over the ownership of the Tomb of Ezekiel and its affiliation with the Jews. Causing many Jews to submit complaints to the authorities. In 1860, Ottoman viceroy of the Baghdad vilayet, Mustafa Nuri Pasha, attempted to stir controversy by claiming that the site belonged to Muslims only due to having a minaret. Disregarding that the site was historically significant and sacred to both Jews and Muslims. The British consul in Baghdad attempted to resolve the issue of ownership and wrote that the Jews claimed that "the tomb has been in their possession for upwards of 2,000 years and that their right to it has never before been questioned". Upon the intervention of the Anglo-Jewish Association, an Ottoman government emissary from Istanbul decided in favor of the Jewish claim. At the turn of the 20th century, the Gazetteer of the Persian Gulf, Oman and Central Arabia stated that the tomb is "more venerated by Jews than it is by Muhammadans."

== Architecture and design ==
The dating of the current structure's construction is unknown, the earliest agreed archeological date of the construction of the modern structure is 1316 which coincides with the construction of the mosque. The tomb begins with a rectangular hall containing four longitude niches, each akin to an iwan. Those arches are vaulted with barrel vaults ending in pointed arches that join together in four to form a circular structure in which the muqarnas are held. These muqarnas are part of the larger conical dome that provides the first hall above the shrine and adjacent tombs, dedicated to other Jewish figures, that are also located in the shrine. There is a door in the center of the western hall, dating back to the Mongol period, that leads to the shrine and connects it to the prayer hall, decorated with medieval Islamic floral designs.

=== The conical dome ===
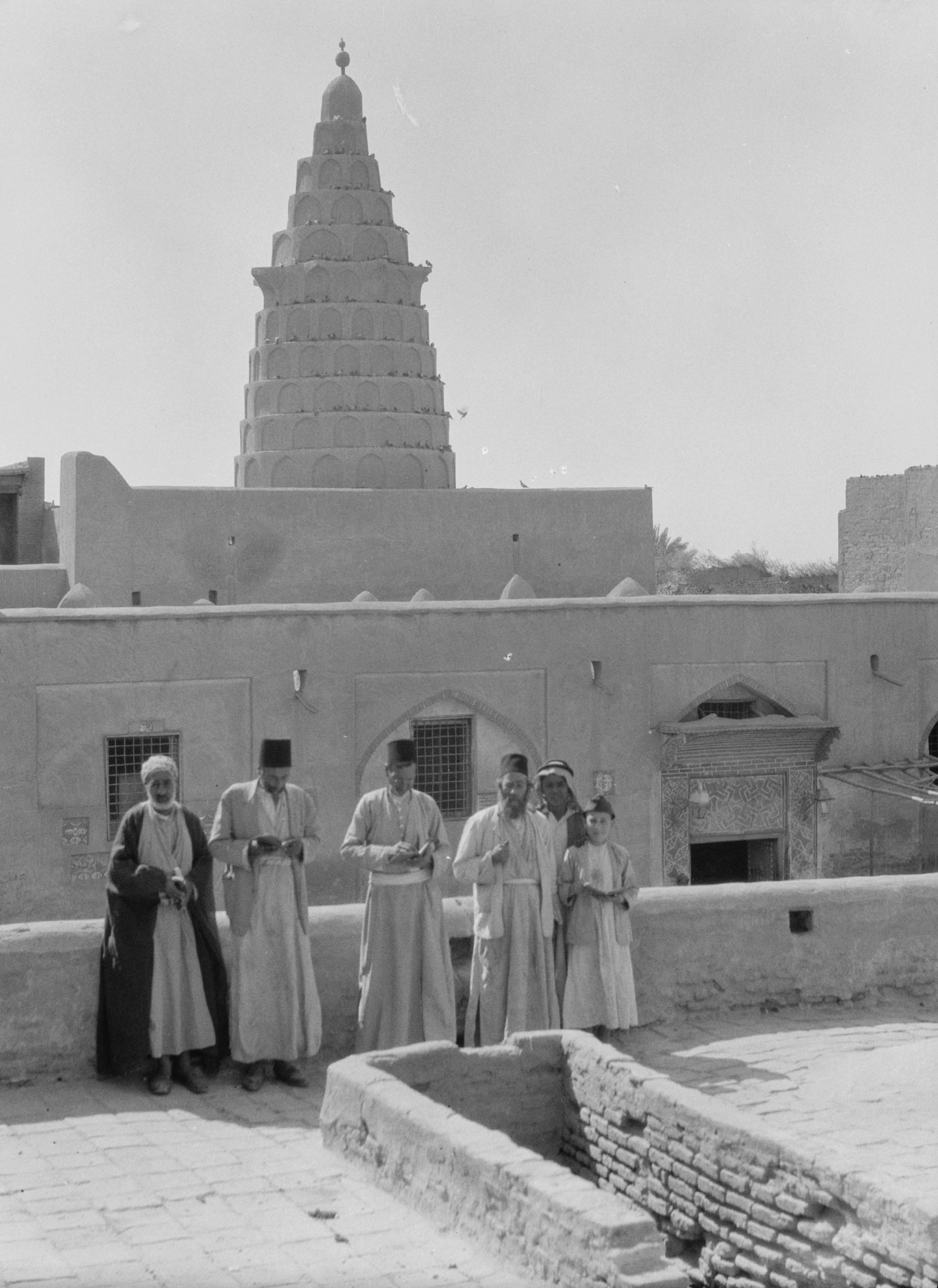
Iraqi Jews at Ezekiel's Tomb, 1932.

The conical dome's interior is also decorated with medieval Islamic floral designs accompanied by ancient Hebrew inscription from the Torah beneath it in a circular band. Between both are three windows. The dome is conical in shape, it contains 10 layers of muqarnas excluding the dome's tiny covering. Each layer is composed of an arcade of pointed arches that are flat on their interiors. The sixth layer, however, consists of simple squinches also topped with pointed arches. The conical dome of the tomb is similar to that of the many Abbasid era mausoleums around Iraq, such as the tomb of Zumurrud Khatun, the tomb of Umar Suhrawardi, and the tomb of Imam Hasan of Basra.

=== The shrines ===
A zarih covers the grave of Ezekiel, with a green Arabic textile wishing peace upon the prophet. In the mosque section of the shrine are four tombs of the companions of the Abrahamic prophet Jeremiah, including Baruch, credited to be the author of the Book of Baruch.

== Present day ==
After the fall of Iraqi president Saddam Hussein in 2003, the new Iraqi authorities redeveloped the tomb complex and converted the old synagogue sahn into an area for Muslim prayer. Some Hebrew-language Jewish inscriptions from the tomb chamber were removed and replaced with Quranic verses. The site's status was reportedly protected while under Saddam Hussein's regime. In 2020, it was reported that Iraqi authorities were transforming the synagogue at Ezekiel's Tomb into a mosque.

== See also ==
- Judaism in Iraq
- List of mosques in Iraq
- Shia Islam in Iraq
- Tomb of the Prophet Hazkiel
