= Al-Nukhailah Mosque =

Twelver Shi'ite mosque in Al Kifl, Iraq

An-Nukhailah Mosque
- Arabic: مسجد النخيلة
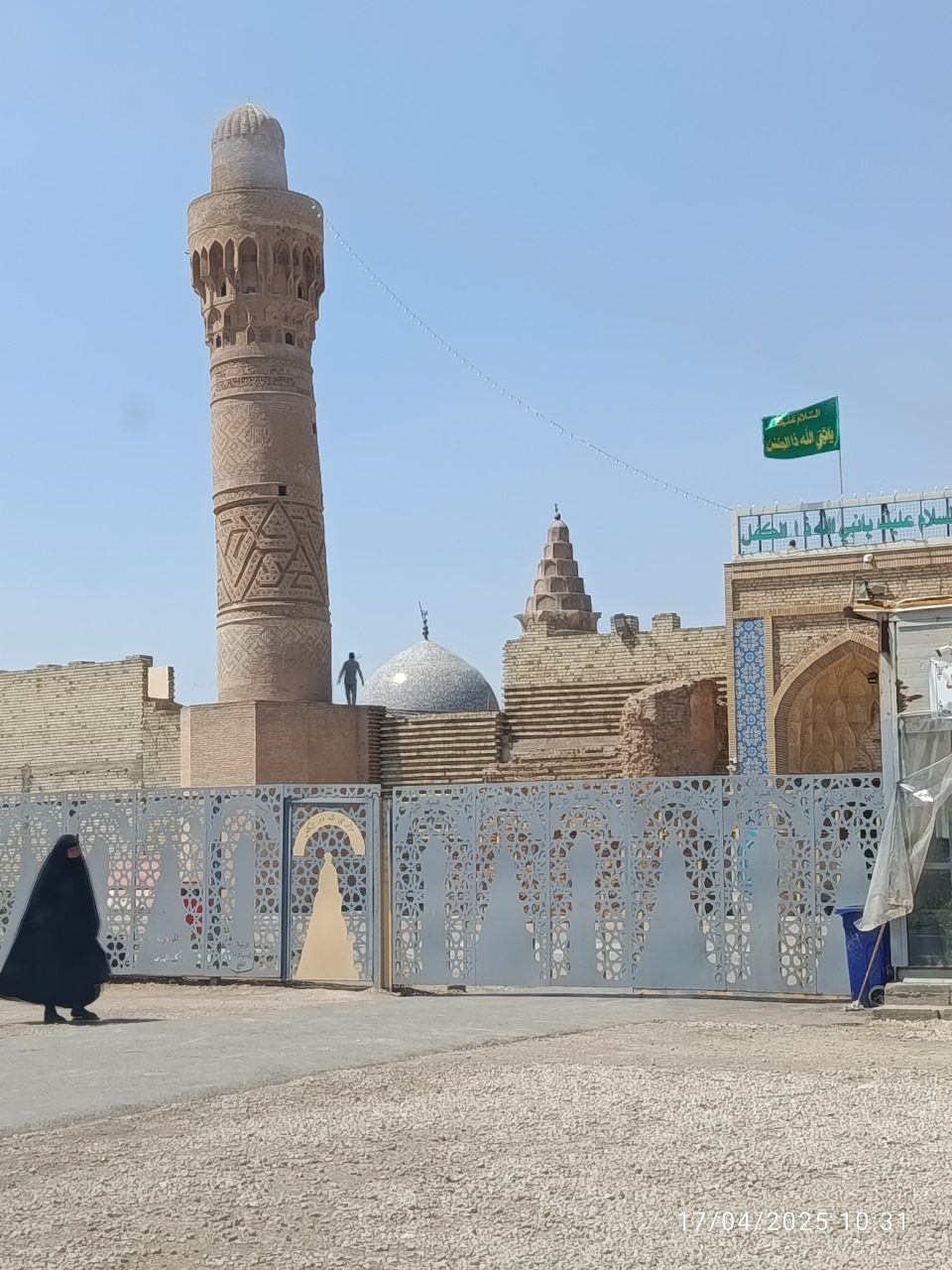
- The exterior view of the mosque

- Location of the mosque in Iraq

Religion
- Affiliation: Shia (Twelver)
- Ecclesiastical or organizational status: Mosque and shrine
- Status: Active

Location
- Location: al Kifl, Al-Hilla District, Babylon Province
- Country: Iraq
- Interactive map of An-Nukhailah Mosque
- Coordinates: 32°13′36″N 44°22′01″E

Architecture
- Type: Islamic architecture
- Style: Ilkhanid
- Completed: 7th century CE (tomb); 1316 CE (mosque)

Specifications
- Dome: One
- Dome height (outer): 20 m (66 ft)
- Minaret: One
- Shrines: Three: Ezekiel's Tomb; Tombs of the Jewish saints; Spot of al-Khidr

Website
- alnukhailah.iq

The Nukhailah Mosque (Arabic: مسجد النخيلة) is a historic Twelver Shi'ite mosque in the town of al-Kifl, in the district of Al-Hilla, in the province of Babylon, Iraq. The mosque is a large complex built over a former Jewish site. The building contains Ezekiel's Tomb (Arabic: مرقد نبي الله ذي الكفل), which is believed to be the tomb of the Quranic prophet Dhu al-Kifl, who is traditionally considered to be Ezekiel.

== History ==
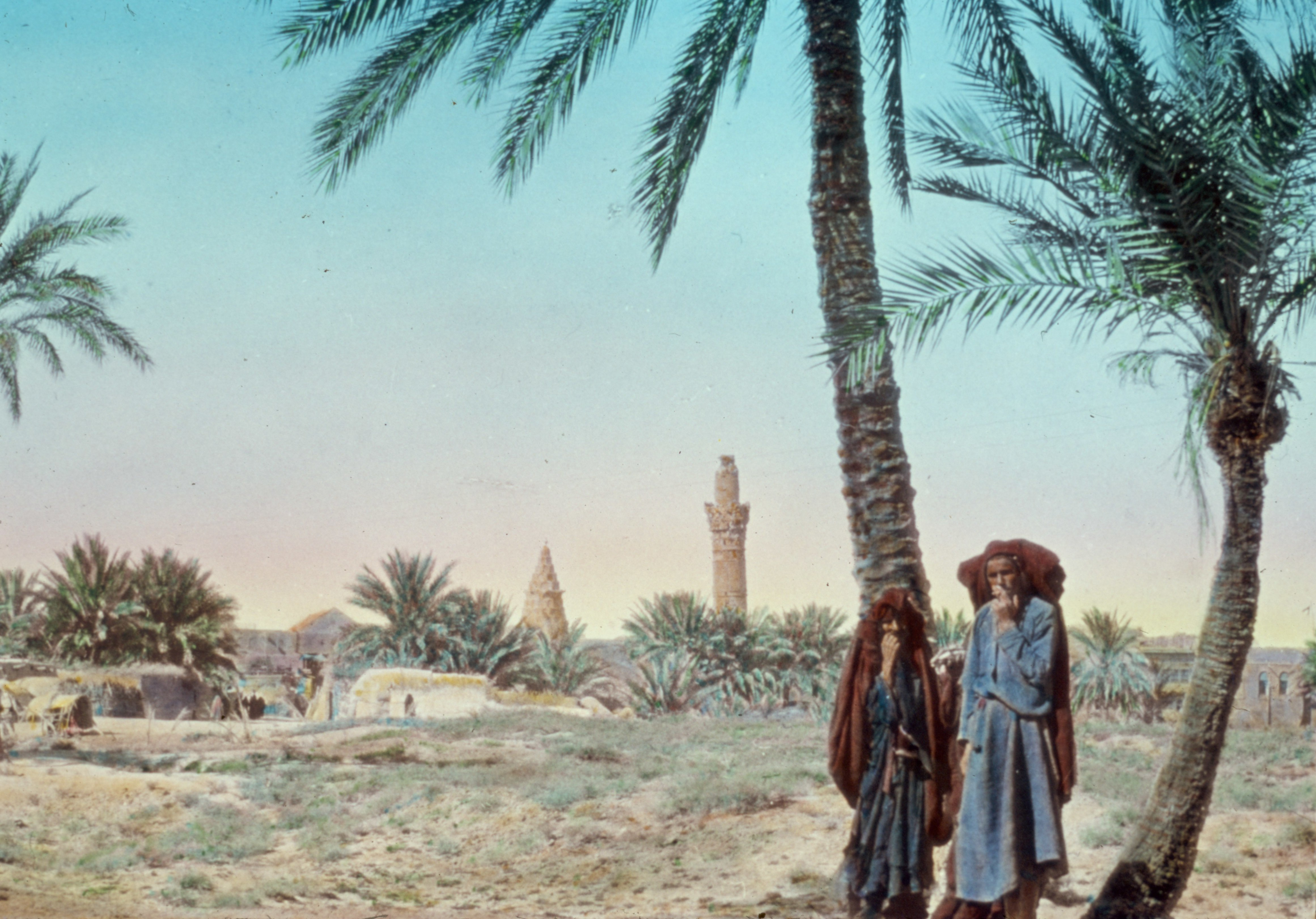
The minaret of the mosque in the 20th century.

The complex was originally a pilgrimage site for Jews; it contained the tomb of the prophet Ezekiel built in the 7th century CE. However, the Twelver Shi'a believe this site has its roots on a shrine built by Abraham, indicated by the description of the Mahdi by Muhammad al-Jawad, the ninth Imam. In 1316 CE, the Il-khan Öljaitü acquired the right of guardianship over the tomb and his son Abu Sa'id Bahadur Khan fully rebuilt the mosque. Since then the site was restored and developed as an Islamic religious site. The iconic minaret and the mosque were erected in the same period.

In 2014, the site, in particular the minarets, were restored by the Iranian companies and the waqf of the Shi’a community, which cost approximately 800 million dinars.

== Architecture ==
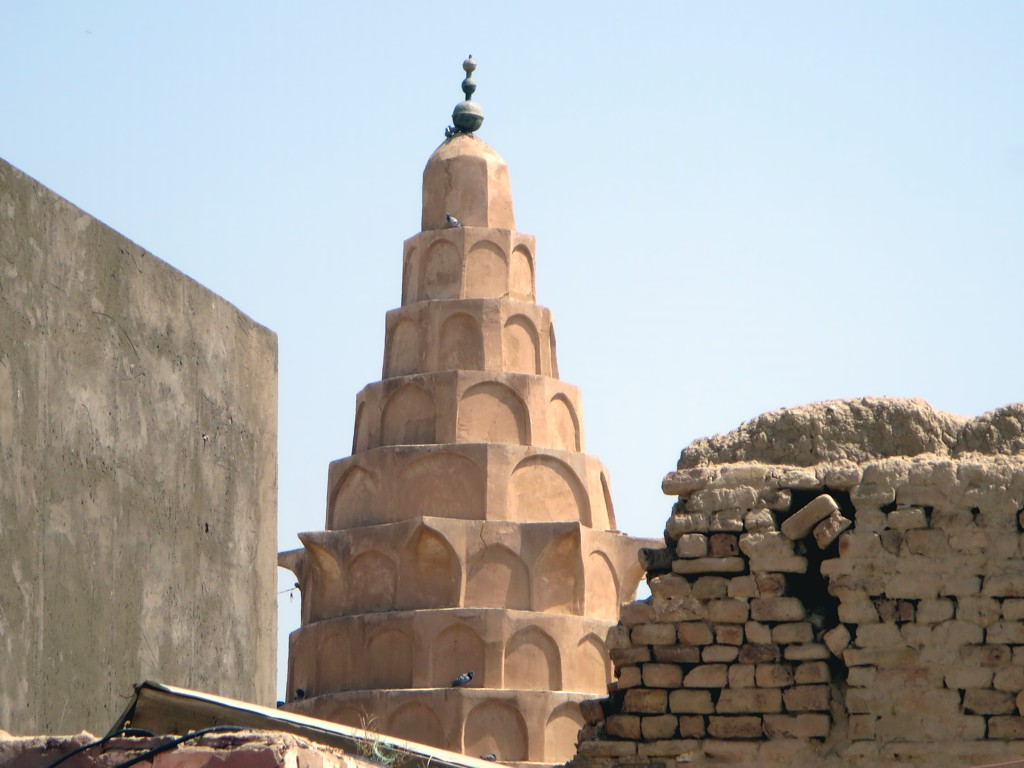
The conical muqarnas dome built above Ezekiel's Tomb (or Dhu'l Kifl)

The unique dome of the tomb has muqarnas adorned inside and mimics the honeycomb pattern on the outside. The surface and the upper part of the wall is painted with a polychrome pattern during Ottoman Iraq. It reaches 20 metres (66 ft) high and sits on the foundation of 4 cubic metres (140 cu ft).

The minaret is accessible through a small door. The body of the minaret is adorned with multiple forms of geometric decorations. It includes three fields of patterns, such as friezes and repeating belts, all of which revolve around the body of the lighthouse. These decorations combine geometric shapes, plant outlines, keffiyeh patterns and naskh calligraphy. Persian inscriptions on the minaret and the walls of the mosque are slightly visible, and they praise the founder of the mosque, the Il-khan Öljaitü.

Next to Ezekiel's Tomb is a hallway which contains the tombs of five Jewish saints on either side who are believed to have either transmitted or compiled the Babylonian Talmud. Their names are Jose ben Halafta, Joshua ben Hananiah, Yohanan ben Zakkai, Baruch ben Neriah (whose grave is isolated from the others), and one of the Kohens who is said to have been a transmitter of the Talmud. A small shrine dedicated to Khidr is also present within the mosque.

To the left of the southern wall is a small commemorative spot which represents a place featured in a legend; it is said that it is where Ali prayed while staying in the mosque on a campaign against Kharijites.

== See also ==
- List of mosques in Iraq
- Shia Islam in Iraq
- Twelver Shia Islam

== Bibliography ==
- al-Janabi, Tariq Jawad (1982). Studies in Medieval Iraqi Architecture. Baghdad: Ministry of Culture and Information, State Organization of Antiquities and Heritage. pp. 96–105.
- Michell, George, ed. (1978). Architecture of the Islamic World. London: Thames and Hudson. p. 246.
