= Kifl =

Kifl may refer to:

- Al Kifl, a town in southern Iraq
- Dhul-Kifl, a person variously considered to be a Muslim prophet or righteous man
- Arabic: kifl, an archaic Arabic word meaning "double" or "duplicate"

== Acronym ==
KIFL may refer to:

- Kangaroo Island Football League, an Australian football league
- Kent Invicta Football League, an English non-league football competition
