= Zulkifl Mausoleum =

Islamic burial site in Surkhan Darya Region, Uzbekistan

Zulkifl mausoleum
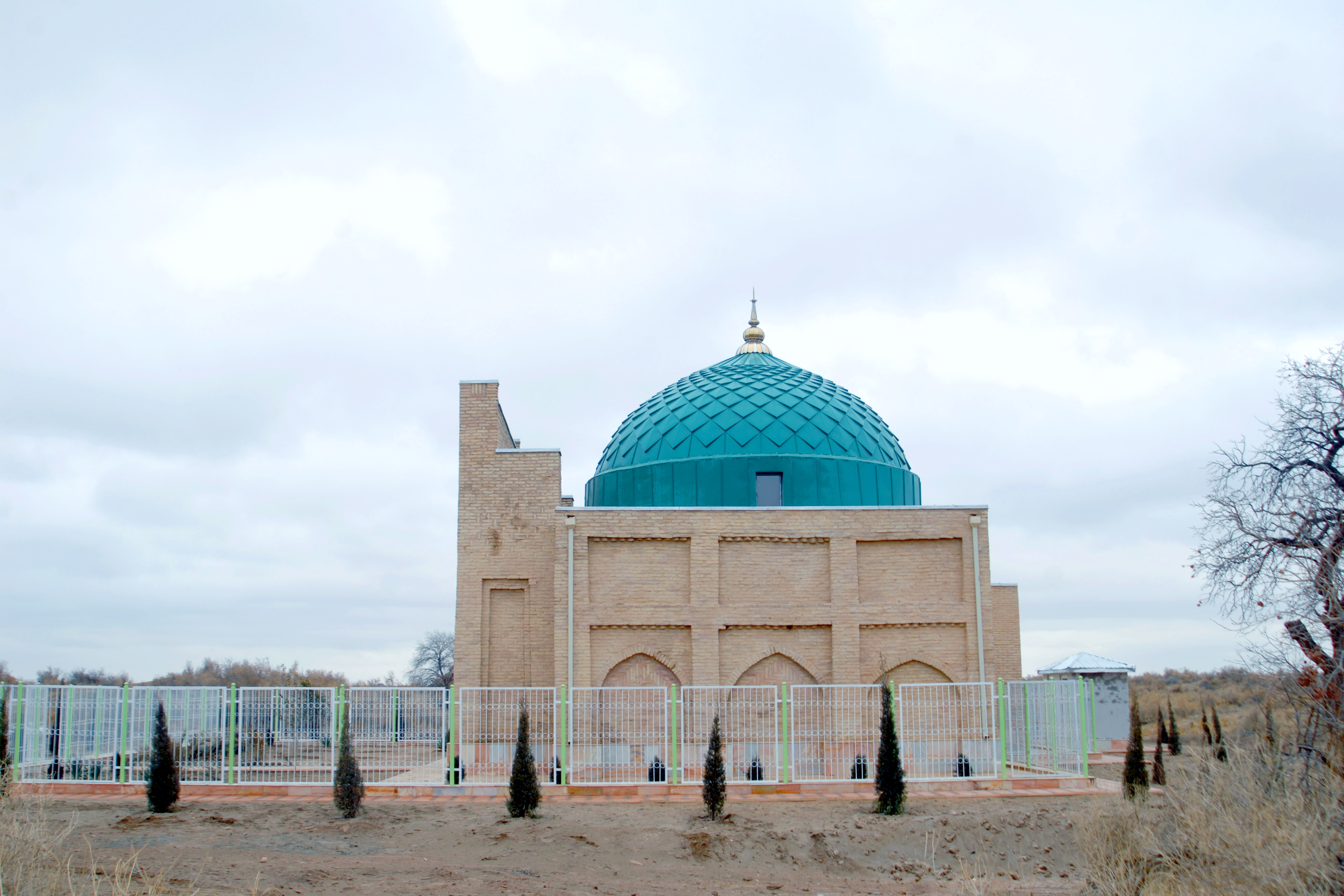
- The Zulkifl mausoleum near Termez
- Interactive map of the Zulkifl mausoleum area

General information
- Architectural style: Islamic
- Location: Aral-Paygambar island, Surkhan Darya Region, Uzbekistan
- Coordinates: 37.2247°N 67.2783°E
- Year built: 11th - 12th centuries

The Zulkifl mausoleum is an architectural monument (11th - 12th centuries) located near Termez. According to legend, the prophet Zulkifl was buried here. Historical sources mention that Ishoq ibn Kunaja (died in 992/993), a descendant of the Abbasid military commanders, was also buried here. The exact years of construction of the mausoleum are unknown, but the buildings date back to the 11th-12th centuries and were built during the reign of Mahmud of Ghazni.

== Naming ==
There are assumptions that the prophet Zul Kifl was buried in this mausoleum. Zul Kifl is considered to be the son of the prophet Ayyub. The Quran and hadiths provide almost no information about him. The prophet Zul Kifl is mentioned in the Anbiya (85-48 verses) and Sad surahs.

The word Zul Kifl means “the owner of the pledge”.

== Location ==
The Zul Kifl mausoleum is located on the Aral-Paygambar island - the Aral-Paygambar reserve area. The island was named after the prophet Zul Kifl, who was supposedly buried there.

== Architecture ==
The mosque, the tomb and two adjacent rooms are located on the southern part of the Aral-Paygambar island. The buildings were built in different periods. The mosque is square-shaped (area 6.95 x 6.95 meters), domed, with a front arch. The niche is decorated with carved plaster. The tomb (area 6 x 4 meters) is built 1 meter higher than the mosque, and contains a sarcophagus. The tomb has two doors that lead to two adjacent rooms. The walls of the rooms are covered with wooden beams in a wavy shape.

The Bukhara scholar Muhammad ibn Valiy wrote about the tomb of the prophet Zul-Kifl in his 17th century work “Bahr al-Akhor”. According to popular legends, the prophet Zul-Kifl threw his body into the Amu Darya river and instructed to bury him where the coffin would stop.

== Aral-Paygambar island ==
The Aral-Paygambar island covers an area of 4000 hectares. The length of the island is eight kilometers, and the width is approximately five-six kilometers. According to experts, the Amu Darya river changes its nature when it approaches the island. In 1971, a reserve was established in this area. Currently, the area is part of the Surkhan State Reserve. The island is covered with forests on 970 hectares.

=== Aral-Paygambar Reserve ===
The Aral-Paygambar Reserve Reserve is located on the shore of the Amu Darya river, and a small ensemble of mausoleums is built on its southern part. There is also a large domed mosque, a small chapel on the southern slope, and two rooms on the western side.
