= Tomb of the Prophet Hazkiel =

Abrhamic holy site in Kurdistan Region, Iraq

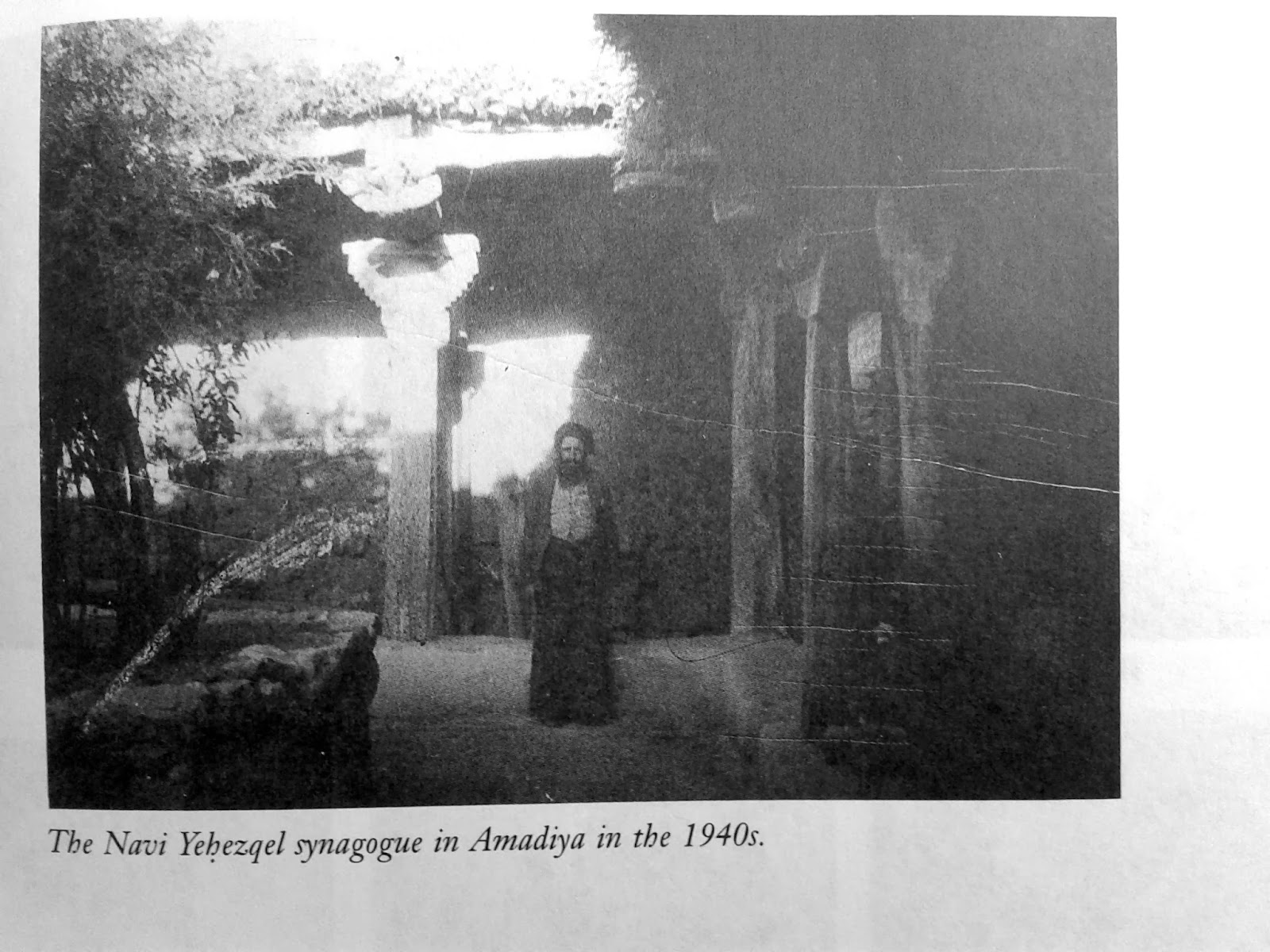
- The synagogue Knis Navi Yehezqel in the 1940s.
- Interactive map of Tomb of the Prophet Hazkiel
- Location: Amadiya, Kurdistan Region
- Coordinates: 37.094248°N 43.387802°E
- Completion date: 1250 for building (tomb attributed to 500–700 BC by Ezekiel interpretation)
- Dedicated to: Ezekiel or Hazana or Hazan David / Hazan Yosef
- Website: General Board of Tourism of Kurdistan Iraq

The Tomb of the Prophet Hazkiel, also known as the Tomb of Hazana (popular name) or Be Hazane (Jewish name), is a shrine in Amedi in Kurdistan Region, and was part of the former synagogue Knis Navi Yehezqel. The tomb is holy to Muslims, Christians and Jews, though there are varying opinions on the identity of who is in the burial vault.

The view of the Kurdistan Region government is that the biblical prophet Ezekiel is buried there, and attributes the burial vault to the time of Ezekiel, 500–700 BC. The synagogue Knis Navi Yehezqel was dedicated to Ezekiel, but the Jews did not consider him to be buried in Amadiyah.

The popular tradition is that it is an obscure Jewish prophet known as Hazana, described by locals as a son of David or a grandson of Joseph or simply as a forgotten figure, and who is associated with purity and fertility.

The Jewish tradition is that it is the burial site of two brothers, Hazan David and Hazan Yosef, who were the first of that community to settle in Amadiya (Hazan is a Jewish title nearly equivalent to Hakham or Rabbi). Hazan David died by tradition in 936, and the synagogue Knis Navi Yehezqel was constructed ca. 1250, perhaps in 1228. Jewish pilgrimages were made during the festival of Shavuot. Mordechai Zaken believes that the founder figure was Hazan Yosef, who was the son of Hazan David.

== See also ==
- Tomb of Nahum, another shrine in Dohuk Governorate
- Ezekiel's Tomb, a shrine attributed to Ezekiel in Babil Governate
