= Al Sahlan =

Qaryat Al Sahlan قرية آل سهلان
- Village
- Location within Iraq
- Coordinates: 32°22′39.1″N 44°19′20.5″E
- Country: Iraq
- Province: Babylon
- District: Al Hillah
- Elevation: 72 ft (22 m)

Qaryat Āl Sahlān (Arabic: آل سهلان) is a village by the Euphrates river, located in Al-Hilla District, Babil Governorate, in central Iraq, about 20 km southwest of the main city Al Hillah.
