= Al-Kifl =

Historical town in Babylon province, Iraq

Al-Kifl الكفل
- City
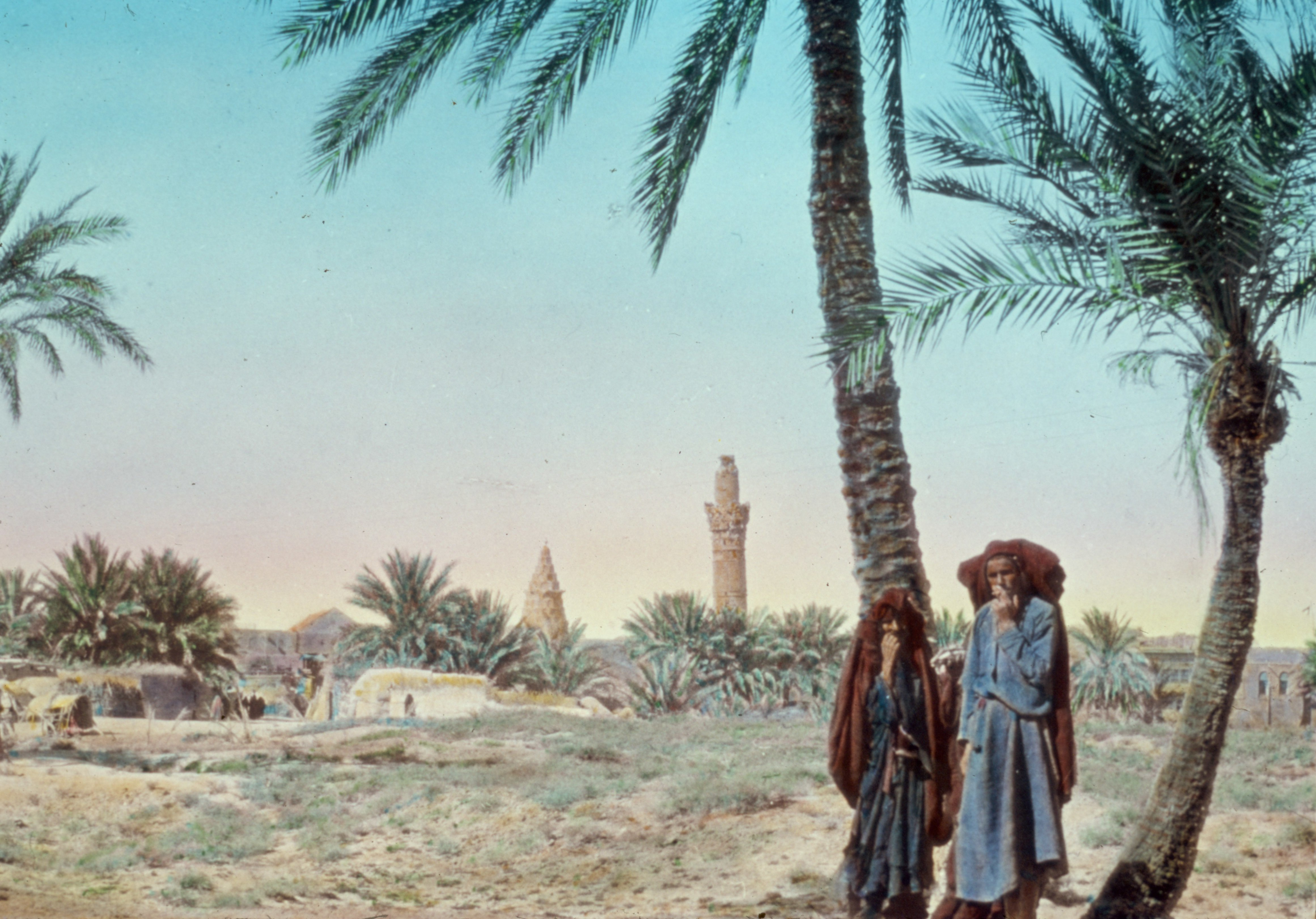
- Al-Kifl between 1950 and 1977.

- Location within Iraq
- Coordinates: 32°13′27″N 44°22′36″E
- Country: Iraq
- Province: Babylon
- District: Al-Hillah
- Named for: Dhul-Kifl

Area
  - Total: 439 sq mi (1,137 km^{2})
- Elevation: 115 ft (35 m)

Population (2018)
  - Total: 22,800
  - Density: 51.9/sq mi (20.1/km^{2})
- Time zone: UTC+3
- Postal code: 50006

Al-Kifl (Arabic: الكفل; also known as Kifl) is a town in southeastern Iraq on the Euphrates River, between Najaf and al-Hilla. The population in and near the town is about 15,000. Al-Kifl is the location of al-Nukhailah Mosque, containing the tomb of Dhu al-Kifl who is believed to be the biblical prophet Ezekiel. A project to renovate the tomb and develop it as a tourist attraction has proven controversial. The town was once a significant Jewish pilgrimage site and home to a community of Iraqi Jews until the late 1940s.

Despite being an ordinary town in the present day, al-Kifl is recognized as a historically important town in Iraq due to its history of coexistence between the three major Abrahamic religions, mainly Islam and Judaism, who collectively give respect to the main city's entombed prophet. The town and its landmarks are also listed on a tentative world heritage list by UNESCO due to its historical and religious importance.

== Names ==
Several names have been given to the town since the Neo-Babylonian era such as Balashakr, Tel al-Ahmar (Arabic: التل اللأحمر, romanized: 'The Red Hill'), and al-Qasunat (Arabic: القسونات, romanized: 'The Pastors'). But the town's current name was adopted during the Ilkhanate era. According to several scholars such as Ignác Goldziher and Hamdallah Mustawfi, the Arabic name of Dhu al-Kifl (Arabic: ذُو الْكِفْل, romanized: 'Possessor of the Portion') is the Arabic and Islamic equivalent of the English Ezekiel. This translation explains the strong connection between the two names, and why the town's tomb is also significant to Iraqi Muslims. The Jewish community who once lived there called the town Chifil (Baghdadi Judeo-Arabic: צ׳פל)

== History ==
=== Early history and legends ===
Like many old settlements in Iraq, the historical origins of the town are disputed among historians. Despite the antiquity of Mesopotamian civilizations, archeological evidence to determine the settlement's true age is nonexistent. Apart from dates recorded next to the old minaret of the main mosque, and the towers and remains of the Khan al-Saif caravanserai. Even so, this archeological evidence is considered incomplete and doesn't give the full scope of the site's true age. Instead, the town's early history is dependent on ancient traditional narrations.

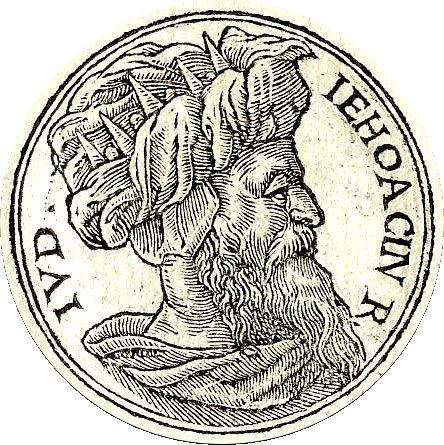
According to several legends, many of the properties related to al-Kifl were owned by the exiled King of Judah Jeconiah.

The site is traditionally believed to have been part of assets and lands belonging to the exiled King Jeconiah. According to a tradition recorded by Andalusian traveler Benjamin of Tudela in the book The Journey of Benjamin translated by Ezra Haddad, a synagogue dedicated to the Abrahamic prophet Ezekiel was built on the banks of the Euphrates with the help of around 35 thousand Jews during the Babylonian captivity. One of the corners of the synagogue housed the five books of the Hebrew Bible said to have been written by Ezekiel himself. Another tradition mentioned by Benjamin recounts that King Jeconiah, with the help of the Jews, had built a wall around their settlement with towers after he was released from imprisonment by Amel-Marduk, so that whoever climbed to the top could see the Tower of Babel from a distance. Around this time, Ezekiel passed away and was buried in a cave named the "Cave of Eliyahu," where Shem and Arpachshad, ancestors of Abraham, were also claimed to have been buried. Benjamin also says that the tomb, including its dome, was built by Jeconiah upon Ezekiel's death.

One of the oldest mentions of a tomb of Ezekiel in ancient Iraq occurs in the ancient apocryphal text known as Lives of the Prophets which recounts the lives of several Abrahamic prophets mentioned in the Old Testament. Among those is Ezekiel, who's mentioned to have been slain by an Israelite leader during exile due to the prophet rebuking him for worshipping idols and then buried in the "land of Chaldea". His burial area is described as a cave located in an area given the name Nahor. Also, according to the apocryphal, the cave also contained Shem's and Arpachshad's burials, and had the same plan as the Cave of the Patriarchs' burial in Palestine that Abraham built for his wife, Sarah.

The current town was also built on the ruins of an old trading outpost named Balashkar, later known as Be'er al-Mallaha in Arabic, which was built around 60 CE by the Parthian King Vologases I. The town acquired its modern name from Dhu al-Kifl in his honor, and is a geographically significant location. In the ancient world, it was located only 30 kilometers from Babylon. Today, it is situated at the crossroads between Hillah and Kufa, on the eastern banks of the Euphrates. As well as being 125 kilometers south of Baghdad, the capital of Iraq. Due to its location on the banks of the Euphrates, it also gained another geographical importance: it is situated near the midpoint between Najaf and Karbala. As such, al-Kifl had been a home to many caravanserais and stopping stations for visitors and travelers.

=== Under the Abbasid Caliphate ===
Benjamin of Tudela visited the town once during the Abbasid Caliphate. He documented that an estimated 60,000 to 80,000 Jews visit the town and its tomb during the week of Sukkot, as well as mawlid and festivals related to Ezekiel by Muslims. He also documents that the Caliphs respected the site and that Arab merchants typically came to the town to sell their goods. The town was later mentioned by Muslim scholar Yaqut al-Hamawi in his Kitāb Mu'jam al-Buldān by the name of al-Qasunat, saying it was five hours away from Hillah. He noted that the town contained the Nukhailah Mosque and the tomb of Ezekiel, Baruch ben Neriah, and other Jewish figures.

Festivals such as mawlid and yom hillula were held in the town and visited by both Muslim and Jewish dignitaries, and were a gathering place for merchants. The German Rabbi Petachiah of Regensburg also recognized the site's celestial and religious importance for trade and hajj caravans, ones that came from Iraq and Iran, who stopped by for praying. He also stated that pilgrims to the site believed bringing votive deposits would give them children, and give them prolific animals to cultivate.

=== After the Mongol Invasions and Ottoman rule ===
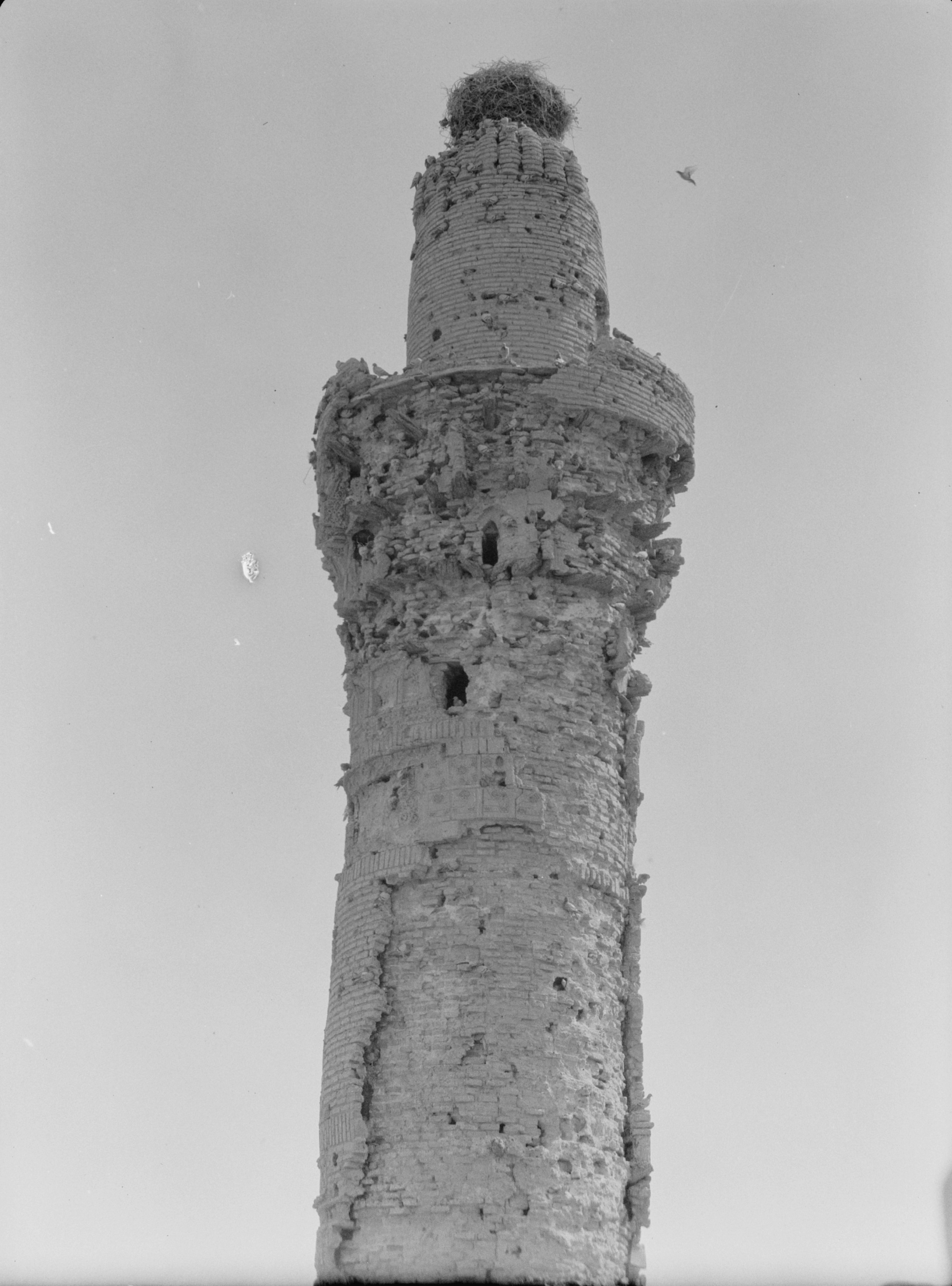
The old minaret of al-Nakhailah Mosque topped by a stork's nest.

After the Mongol invasions, the town housed the home of the Mongol Ilkhanate Sultan representative and noble Taj al-Din al-'Ubi al-Fasti. This enhanced the city's importance at the time, but its importance faded after the death of Ilkhanate Padishah Mohammad-e Khodabandeh in 1316. By the time of Ottoman imperial rule, the significance had faded. The diminishing of its importance also led Turkish inhabitants to disagree with the inhabitants over the ownership of the Tomb of Ezekiel and its affiliation with the Jews. Causing many Jews to submit complaints to the authorities. One such incident occurred in 1860 when Ottoman viceroy of the Baghdad vilayet, Mustafa Nuri Pasha, attempted to stir controversy by claiming that the site belonged to Muslims only due to having a minaret. Disregarding that the site was historically significant and sacred to both Jews and Muslims. This caused controversy among the people of al-Kifl and Baghdad; a special minister from Istanbul was sent to investigate the matter, and he ruled in favor of the Jews.

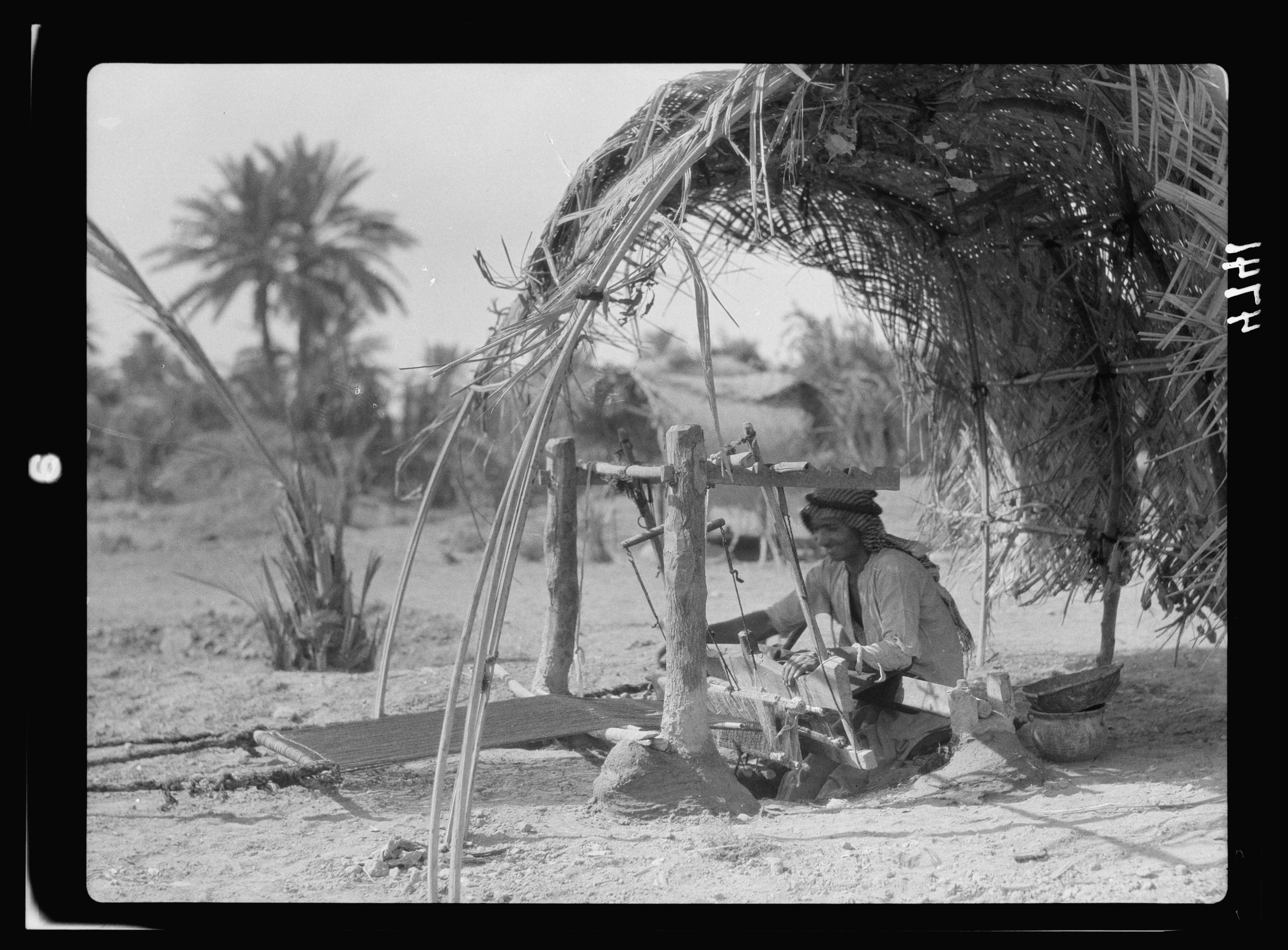
An Arab weaver in al-Kifl, circa 1932.

Another principal reason for the decline of al-Kifl during the Ottoman era was the constant rebelling of Arab tribes, who lacked obedience to the Ottomans, against the Ottoman authorities. In 1725, the Arab tribes of the region, including Shammar, Banu Lam, and other tribes, met in the town to pledge to resist the Ottoman occupation. The meeting prompted the tribes to raid villages and estates and cut off trade roads. Several months later, the viceroy in Baghdad, Ahmad Pasha, led an army crackdown in al-Kifl to defeat and disperse the tribes so that he could return to Baghdad afterwards. Another uprising occurred in 1883 during the reign of viceroy Abdi Pasha. Several of al-Kifl's tribes revolted against the Ottoman garrison, which numbered 13 troops, in an effort to join the Muntafiq confederation instead of being under occupation rule.

German traveler Carsten Niebuhr visited the town in 1766 and noted it for its tomb, mosque, and Arab population. All of al-Kifl was surrounded by a sturdy wall 30 feet in height and 1200 feet in circumference. He noted that the wall was constructed by a man from Kufa named Sulayman. Implying that this is a different wall from the ancient one recorded by Benjamin of Tudela. This wall was also noted by J. J. Benjamin during his visit in 1859.

== Present day and archeology ==
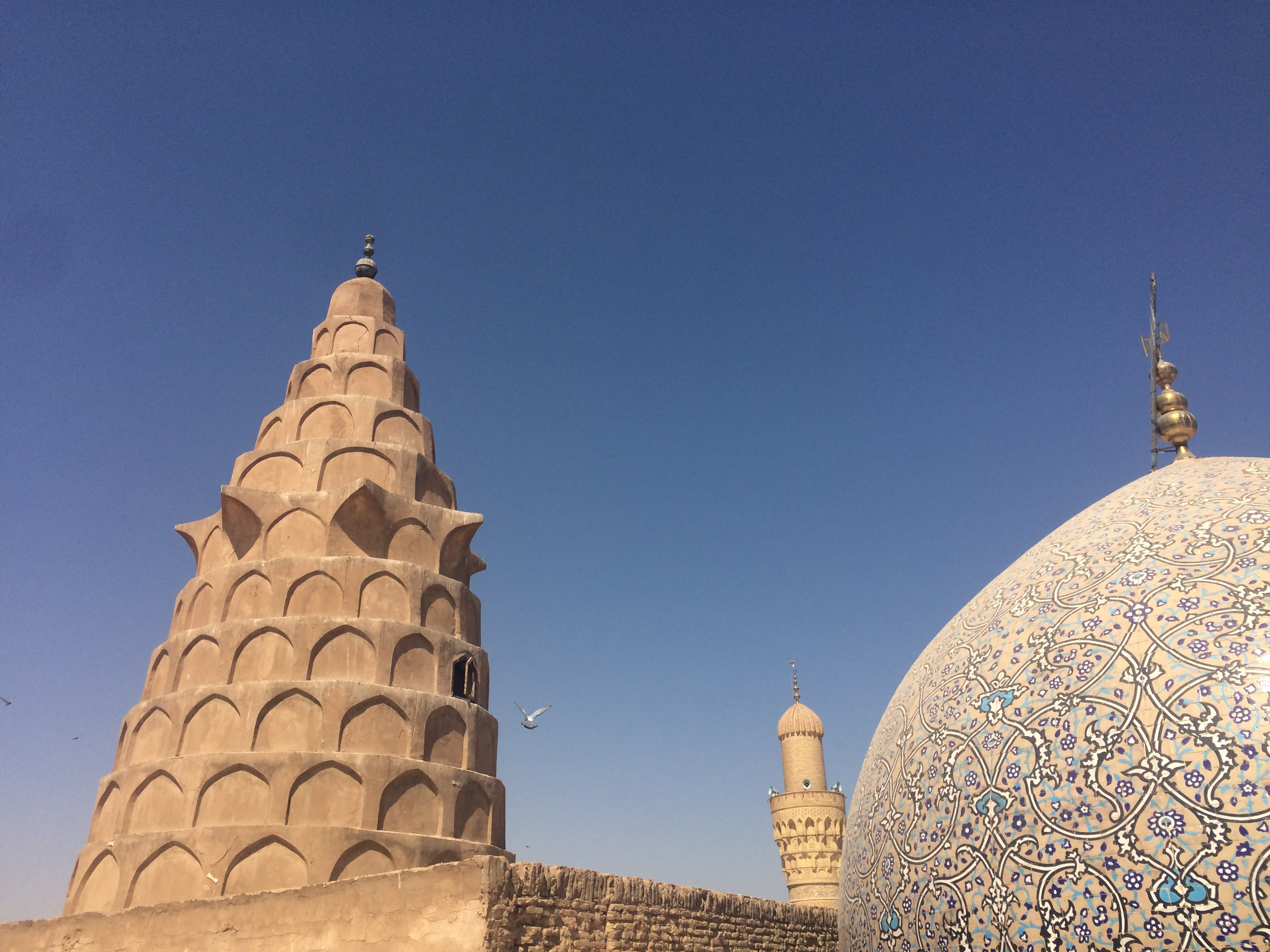
The newly constructed dome and minaret alongside the conical dome of the Tomb of Ezekiel.

The Antiquities and Heritage Authority records that there are 68 immovable antiquities in al-Kifl that date back to both the Mesopotamian and Islamic periods, such as archeological mounds and tombs. Efforts have been made to preserve what remains of the antiquities of al-Kifl and its historical center in general. Beginning in 1978, through a project managed by Abd al-Sattar al-Azzawi, archeological sites and features of the town began to be maintained. In 2002, the Antiquities and Heritage Authority Law No. 55 was passed, which determined that immovable heritage antiquities were those that are over 200 years old, while movable ones were less than 200 years old. This law helped carry out maintenance work on the historical center of al-Kifl, which continued until 2007. Some of the restorations, including that of the mosque, were carried out under the supervision of UNESCO.

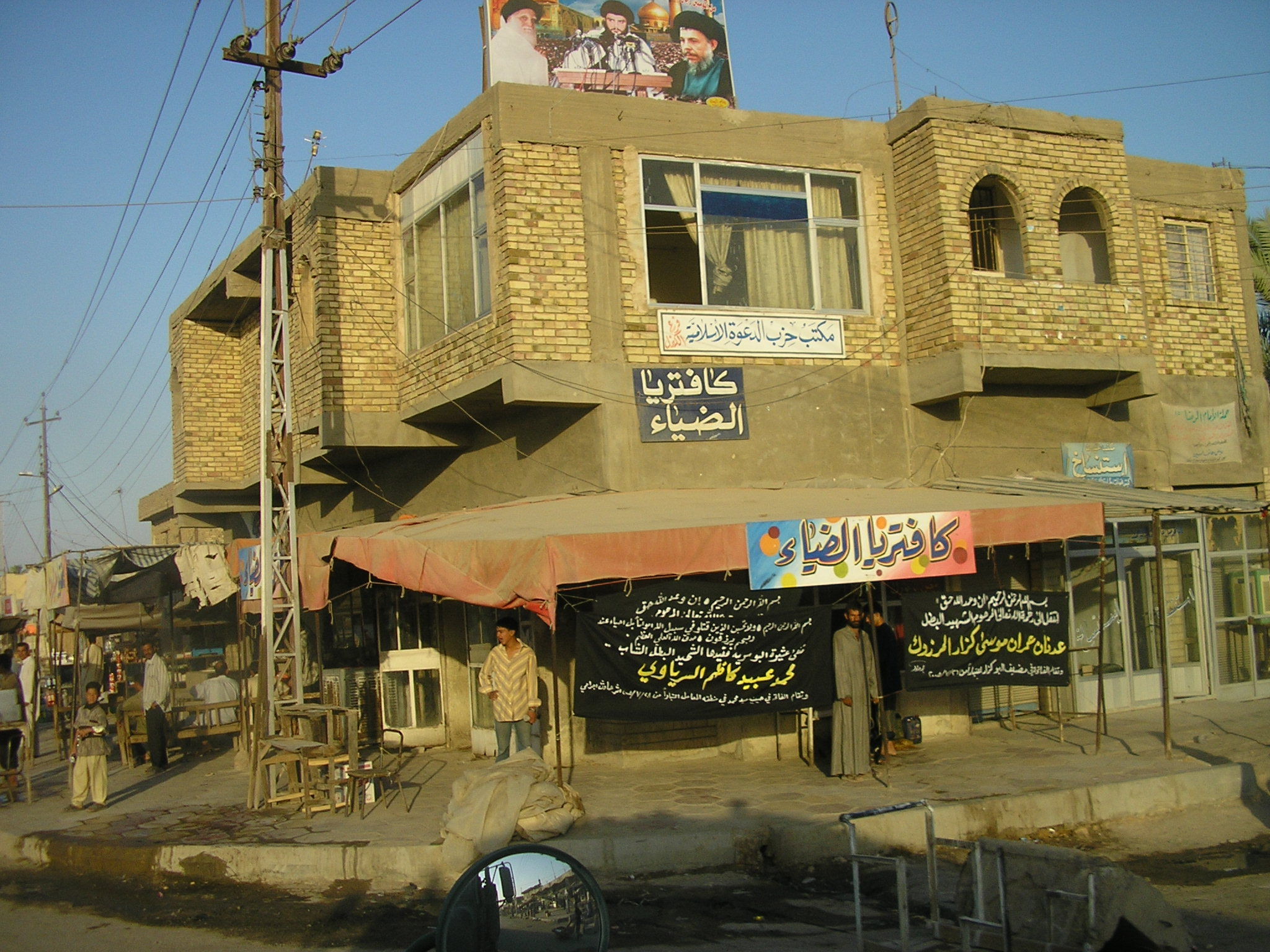
Vendors line the main road through al-Kifl, 2007.

Since the Iraq War, several groups, such as the World Jewish Congress, refused and condemned the restoration of the mosque due to fears of destruction of Jewish features of the complex. A Jewish Iraqi named David Musa Salim Daniel reportedly tried to appeal to the Iraqi government to take care of the complex of al-Kifl well due to its shared cultural and heritage significance to both Jews and Muslims. In beginning in 2010 to 2014, the site, in particular the minarets, was restored by the Iranian companies and the Shi'i Endowment Office, which cost approximately 800 million dinars. However, this project was controversial due to the Shi'is' attempt to erase the complex from its Jewish background.

As for the town of al-Kifl, the town saw a major decline after the Iraq War. Many of its families resorted to extensive child labor to earn enough money to go to school. However, the Saudi newspaper Arab News reported in 2025 cases of female workers working in dire conditions who have been working since they were children in the 2010s to produce bricks at a factory.

== Major sites ==
=== Tombs of Ezekiel and Baruch ===
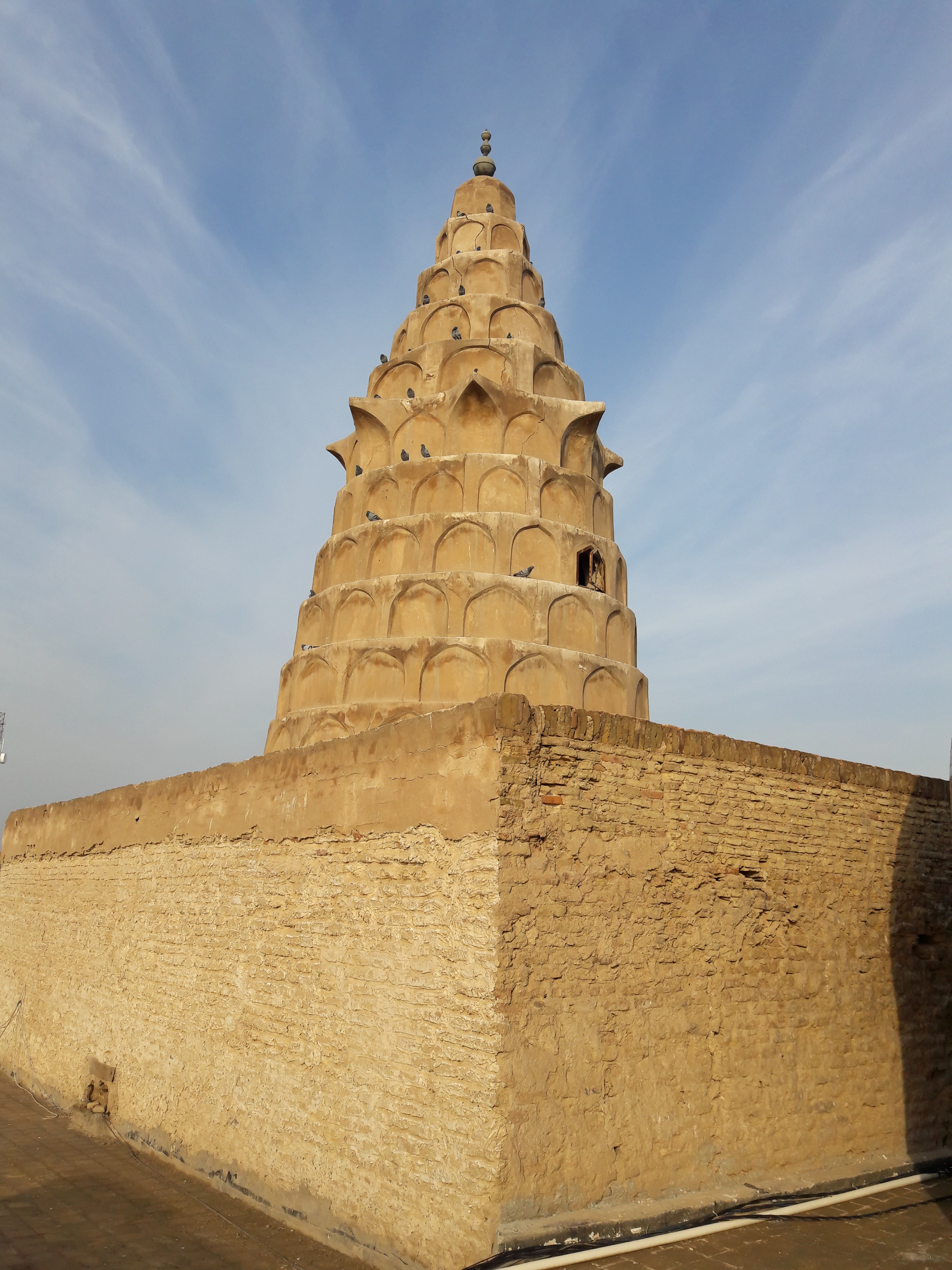
The old conical dome that tops the Tomb of Ezekiel.

The central point of the town is the tomb of the Abrahamic prophet Ezekiel, which has historically been recognized as a sacred site for both Jews and Muslims in Iraq. His tomb is topped by a conical dome and decorated with motifs painted on plaster on the inside. The conical dome sits on an octagonal base that has four windows spread on four sides, and is topped by 10 layers, excluding the tiny covering on the top. Adjacent to the main tomb are other tombs dedicated to Biblical companions. Historical evidence indicates that the current shrine was built shortly before the mosque around 1316. However, the exact age of the entire complex is unknown. The conical dome of the tomb is similar to that of the many Abbasid era mausoleums around Iraq, such as the tomb of Zumurrud Khatun, the tomb of Umar Suhrawardi, and the tomb of Imam Hasan of Basra.

A zarih covers the grave of Ezekiel, with a green Arabic textile wishing peace upon the prophet. In the mosque section of the shrine are four tombs of the companions of the Abrahamic prophet Jeremiah, including Baruch, credited to be the author of the Book of Baruch.

=== Al-Nukhailah Mosque ===
The mosque and its old minaret were built by Ilkhanate Padishah Mohammad-e Khodabandeh in 1316. The minaret was excavated on 8 August 1978 by Professor Khalid Abd al-Salim al-Azzawi, and his excavations were documented and published in volume 43 of Sumer Magazine in 1984.

=== Souk Daniel ===
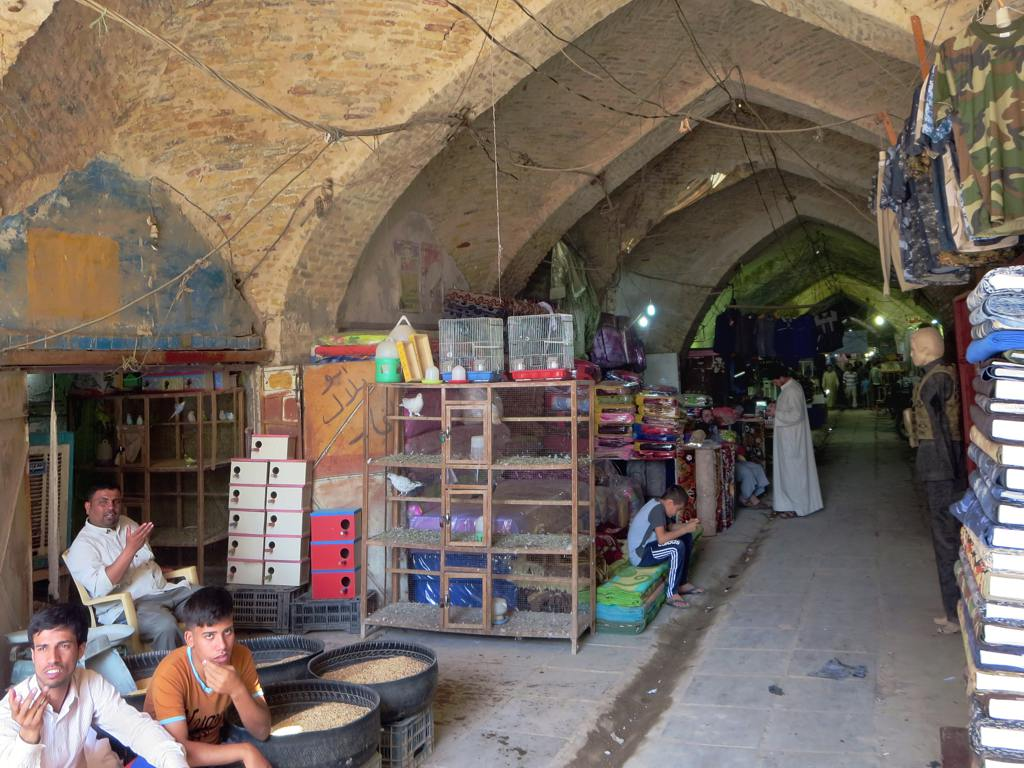
Souk Daniel, a well-preserved cover market in the town.

Souk Danial, also known as the Grand Souk, is the main market of al-Kifl. The souk was established by a wealthy Jewish merchant named Menachem Saleh Daniel. It is located south of the Tomb of Ezekiel and the former caravanserais of Khan al-Saif and Khan al-Tamar. Currently, the souk remains in business and is still maintained. The market has an elongated, strip-like layout. With stores situated on both sides inside of iwans. It was originally built in the Ottoman era when a commercial market was needed at the peak of commercialization in the empire. The souk contains 81 stores, with a length of 91 meters and a height of eight meters. The souk also faces challenges from reckless residents who violate the area by building residential houses in restricted areas.

A second market, Souk al-Ariyya, is located perpendicular to Souk Daniel on its western side. It intersects and crosses with the Souk, and leads through to Khan al-Tamar.

=== Historical caravanserais ===
There are four archeological caravanserais in al-Kifl. Their precise dates are unknown, but their architectural features date back to at least the 18th century. These are:

- Khan al-Saif (Arabic: خان السيف, romanized: 'The Sword's Inn'), which lies on the eastern part of the shrine in the northern wall of which the main mosque's minaret's base was constructed. It contains a courtyard, which is measured 12X15m, surrounded by corridors containing iwans topped by vaults. The caravanserai was demolished by the Shi'i Endowment Office during their expansion of the mosque.
- Khan al-Quraysh (Arabic: خان القريش, romanized: 'The Inn of the Quraysh'), located north of Khan al-Saif, and contains a courtyard measuring 10X12m built with baked bricks and gypsum.
- Khan al-Tamar (Arabic: خان التامر, romanized: 'The Inn of the Palm Dates'), which is located on the western part of the shrine. It was also consisting of an open courtyard measured 15X20m, and built with baked bricks and gypsum. This caravanserai was also removed by the Shi'i Endowment Office during their expansion of the mosque.
- Khan al-Dibs (Arabic: خان الدبس, romanized: 'The Inn of the Palm Dates Syrup'), located in the middle of the main souk of al-Kifl. Located south of the Tomb of Ezekiel, a half-circular dome was centered over the building, which consisted of several chambers and iwans. Likewise, it is also built with baked bricks and gypsum.

== See also ==
- Babylonian Captivity
- History of the Jews in Iraq
- Nehardea – A Jewish Neo-Babylonian city in al-Anbar.
- List of Jewish sites in Iraq
