= Dhu'l-Nun =

Dhu'l-Nun, Dhu'n-Nun or Zu'n-Nun (Arabic: ذو النون, romanized: Ḏū n-Nūn, lit. 'he who possesses the great fish') is an epithet of Jonah in Islam.

It is also a masculine given name. Variants include Zünnûn (in Turkish).

People named Dhu'l-Nun or its variants include:

- Dhu'l-Nun al-Misri, a 9th-century Sufi
- Melik Zünnun, a 12th-century Danishmendid ruler
- Dhu'l-Nun Ayyub (1908–1988), Iraqi novelist

== See also ==
- Dhunnunid dynasty
