= Ezekiel =

Prophet in the Abrahamic religions

Ezekiel יְחֶזְקֵאל
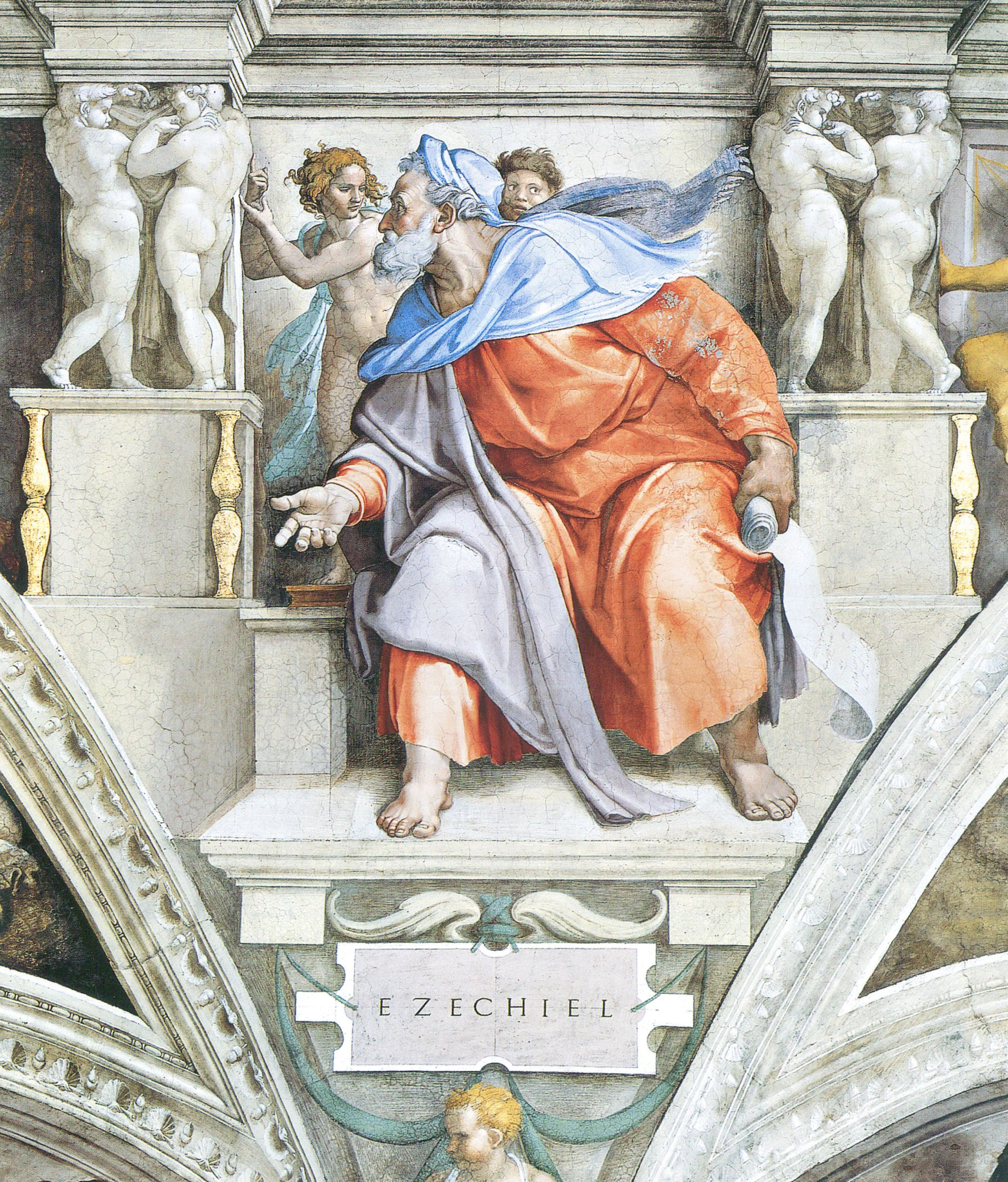
- Depiction by Michelangelo on the Sistine Chapel ceiling

Prophet and Priest
- Born: Possibly c. 623 BC; Jerusalem, Kingdom of Judah
- Died: After c. 571 BC; Babylon, Neo-Babylonian Empire
- Venerated in: Judaism; Christianity; Islam; Baháʼí Faith; Rastafari
- Major shrine: Ezekiel's Tomb, Iraq
- Feast: August 28 – Armenian Apostolic Church; July 23 – Orthodoxy and Roman Catholicism; July 21 – Lutheranism
- Controversy: Babylonian captivity

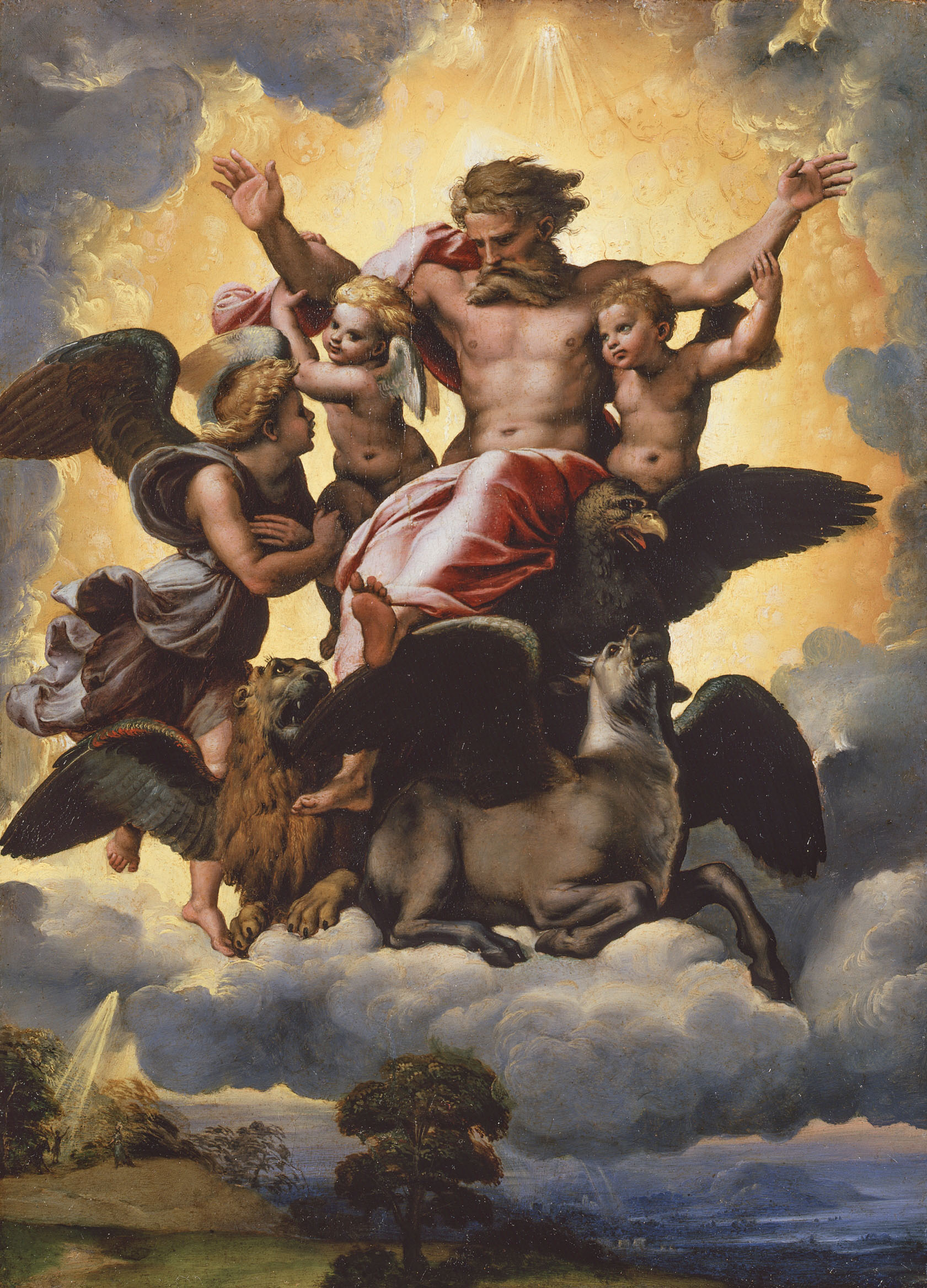
Ezekiel's Vision by Raphael, c. 1518 AD

Ezekiel, also spelled Ezechiel (/ɪˈziːkiəl/; Hebrew: יְחֶזְקֵאל, romanized: Yəḥezqēl [jə.ħɛzˈqeːl]; Koine Greek: Ἰεζεκιήλ, romanized: Iezekiḗl [i.ɛ.zɛ.kiˈel]), was an Israelite priest. The Book of Ezekiel, relating his visions and acts, is named after him.

The Abrahamic religions acknowledge Ezekiel as a prophet. According to the narrative, Ezekiel prophesied the destruction of Judah's capital city Jerusalem. In 587 BC, the Neo-Babylonian Empire conquered Jerusalem, destroyed Solomon's Temple, and sent the Judahite upper classes into the Babylonian captivity.

However, Ezekiel also prophesied the eventual restoration of the Jewish people to the Land of Israel. It is believed he died around 570 BC; Ezekiel's Tomb is a Jewish religious site in Mesopotamia. Three decades later, in 539 BC, the Persian empire conquered Babylon and the Edict of Cyrus repatriated the exiles.

== Etymology ==
The name "Ezekiel" means "God is strong" or "God strengthens" in Hebrew.

== Biblical account ==
The author of the Book of Ezekiel presents himself as Ezekiel, the son of Buzi, born into a priestly (kohen) lineage. The author dates his first divine encounter to "the thirtieth year" according to Ezekiel 1:1–2. Ezekiel describes his calling to be a prophet, detailing his encounter with God and four "living creatures" with four wheels beside them.

According to Ezekiel 1:1 and 3:15, Ezekiel and his wife lived during the Babylonian captivity on the banks of the Kebar Canal in Tel Abib near Nippur (Note: Not to be confused with modern day Tel Aviv, located on the Mediterranean coastline. However, this location's name was influenced by Ezekiel 3:15.) with other exiles from the Kingdom of Judah. There is no mention of him having children.

=== Chronology ===
In the text, the "thirtieth year" is identified as the fifth year of the exile of Jeconiah, King of Judah, by the Neo-Babylonian Empire beginning in 597 BC (though the kingdom was allowed to continue under Zedekiah); this dates Ezekiel's vision to 593 BC. The last recorded prophecy of Ezekiel dates to April 571 BC, sixteen years after the destruction of Jerusalem in 587 BC. Thus, Ezekiel's prophecies occurred over about 22 years.

The "thirtieth year" may refer to Ezekiel's age at the time of his first vision, making him fifty-two years old at his final vision. However, the Targum Jonathan on Ezekiel 1:1 and the 2nd-century rabbinic work Seder Olam Rabba (chapter 26) interpret it to mean "in the thirtieth year after Josiah was presented with a Book of the Law discovered in the Temple" in 622 BC, the time of Josiah's reforms and Jeremiah's prophecies. These two interpretations can be reconciled if Ezekiel was born around the same time as Josiah's reforms.

== Extrabiblical accounts ==
=== Jewish tradition ===
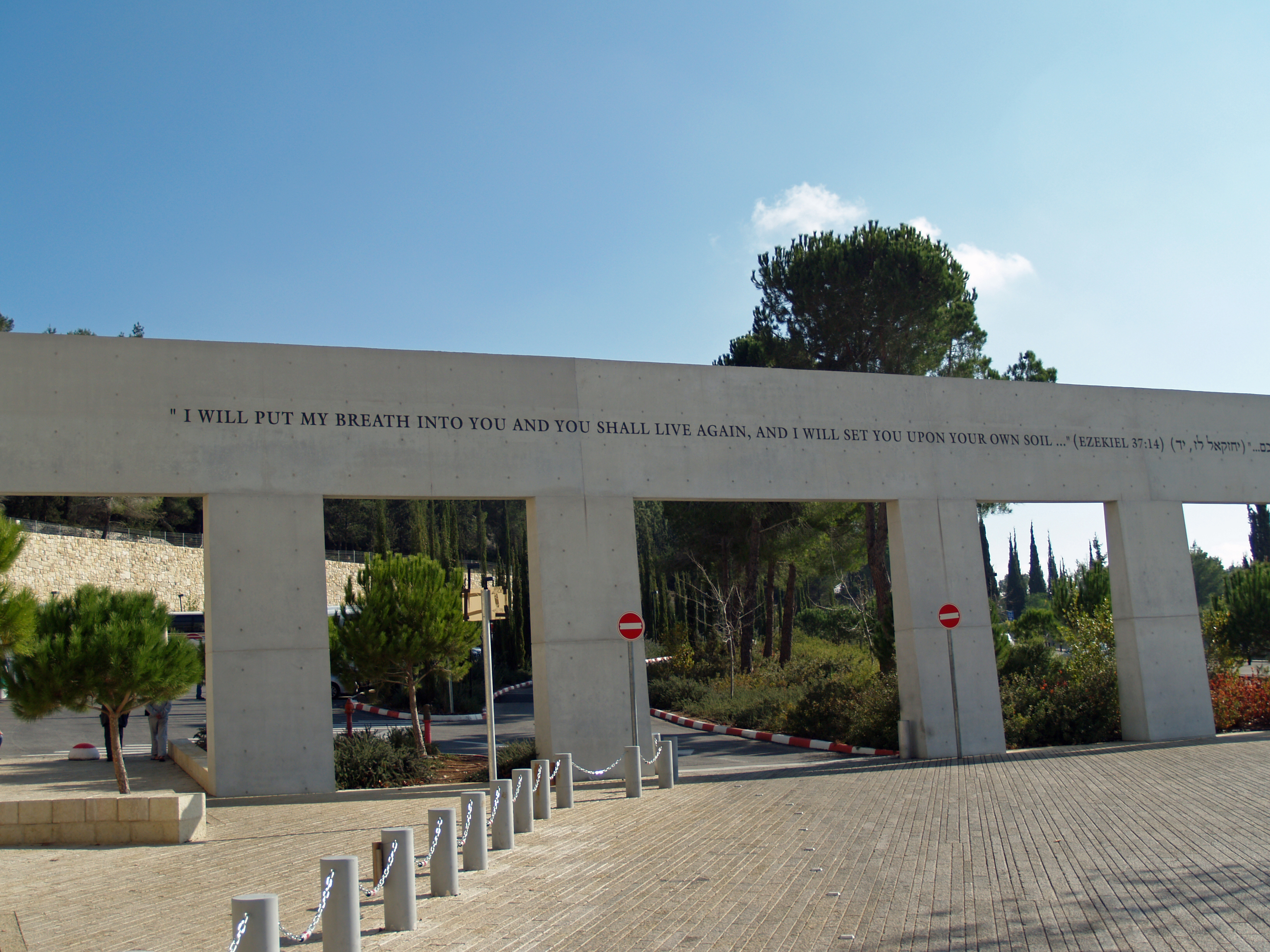
Monument to Holocaust survivors at Yad Vashem in Jerusalem; the quote is Ezekiel 37:14.

According to Jewish tradition, Ezekiel did not write the biblical Book of Ezekiel, but rather his prophecies were collected by the Great Assembly.

Ezekiel, like Jeremiah, is said by Talmud and Midrash to have been a descendant of Joshua by his marriage with the proselyte and former prostitute Rahab. Some statements found in rabbinic literature posit that Ezekiel was the son of Jeremiah, who was (also) called "Buzi" because he was despised by the Jews.

According to Josephus, Ezekiel was already active as a prophet while in the Land of Israel, and he retained this gift when he was exiled with King Jehoiachin and the nobles of the country to Babylon. Josephus relates that Nebuchadnezzar's Babylonian armies exiled 10,832 people from Judah, after deposing Jehoiachin in 598 BC.

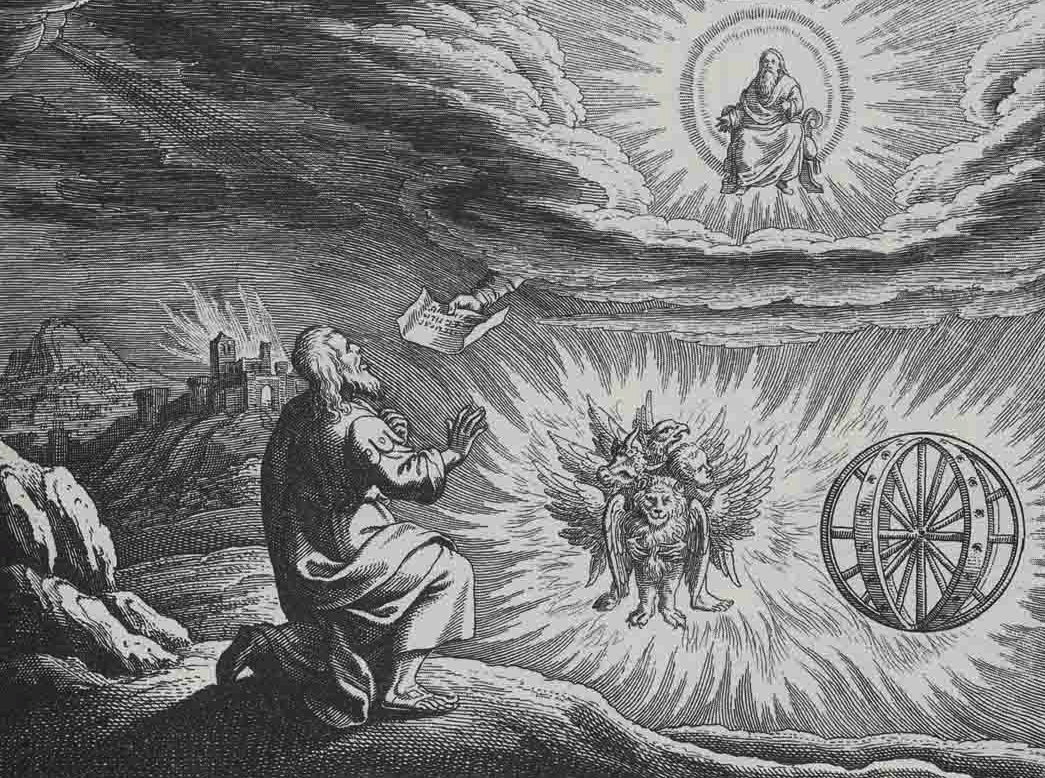
One traditional depiction of the cherubim and chariot vision, based on the description by Ezekiel

Rava states in the Babylonian Talmud that although Ezekiel describes the appearance of the throne of God (merkabah), this is not because he had seen more than the prophet Isaiah: on the contrary, Isaiah described the divine glory as a courtier would describe the royal court where he served; whereas Ezekiel wrote as a peasant floridly embellishing a distant majesty. Ezekiel, like all the other prophets, has beheld only a blurred reflection of God, as if seen in a poor mirror.

According to the midrash Shir HaShirim Rabbah, it was Ezekiel whom the three pious men, Hananiah, Mishael, and Azariah (also called Shadrach, Meshach, and Abednego) asked for advice as to whether they should resist Nebuchadnezzar's command and choose death by fire rather than worship his idol. At first God revealed to the prophet that they could not hope for a miraculous rescue, and the prophet grieved for these men who were the "remnant of Judah". But when they left fully determined to sacrifice their lives to God, Ezekiel received this revelation:

When they went out from before Ezekiel, the Holy One blessed be He revealed Himself and said: 'Ezekiel, what do you think, that I will not stand by them? I will certainly stand by them.' That is what is written: "So said the Lord God: Concerning this too, I will acquiesce to the house of Israel" (Ezekiel 36:37). 'But leave them and do not say anything to them. I will leave them to proceed unsuspecting.'

=== Christian tradition ===
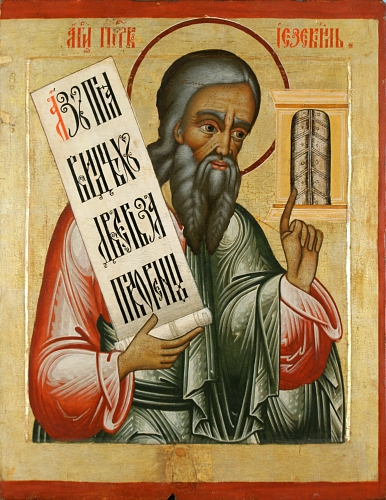
Russian icon of the Prophet Ezekiel holding a scroll with his prophecy and pointing to the "closed gate" (18th century, Iconostasis of Kizhi monastery, Russia)

Ezekiel’s “renewed covenant “ with Israel promises to “remove your hearts of stone and put in a heart of flesh so you can follow my statutes” (EZ 37:21-27). This is quoted by the apostle Paul in his second letter to the Corinthians (3:3). Ezekiel’s visions of the 4 living creatures (EZ chapter 1), the battle against Gog of Magog (EZ chapters 38-39) and his vision of a river flowing from the temple EZ 47:1-12) are quoted and reinterpreted in Revelation (4:6, 20:7, 22:1).

Ezekiel is commemorated as a saint in the liturgical calendar of the Eastern Orthodox Church—and those Eastern Catholic Churches which follow the Byzantine Rite—on July 21 (for those churches which use the traditional Julian Calendar, July 21 falls on August 5 of the modern Gregorian Calendar). Ezekiel is commemorated on August 28 on the Calendar of Saints of the Armenian Apostolic Church, and on April 10 in the Roman Martyrology.

Certain Lutheran churches also celebrate his commemoration on July 21.

Saint Bonaventure interpreted Ezekiel's statement about the "closed gate" as a prophecy of the Incarnation: the "gate" signifying the Virgin Mary and the "prince" referring to Jesus. This is one of the readings at Vespers on Great Feasts of the Theotokos in the Eastern Orthodox and Byzantine Catholic Churches. This imagery is also found in the traditional Catholic Christmas hymn "Gaudete" and in a saying by Bonaventure, quoted by Alphonsus Maria de' Liguori: "No one can enter Heaven unless by Mary, as though through a door." The imagery provides the basis for the concept that God gave Mary to humanity as the "Gate of Heaven" (thence the dedication of churches and convents to the Porta Coeli), an idea also laid out in the Salve Regina (Hail Holy Queen) prayer.

John B. Taylor credits the subject with imparting the Biblical understanding of the nature of God.

=== Islamic tradition ===
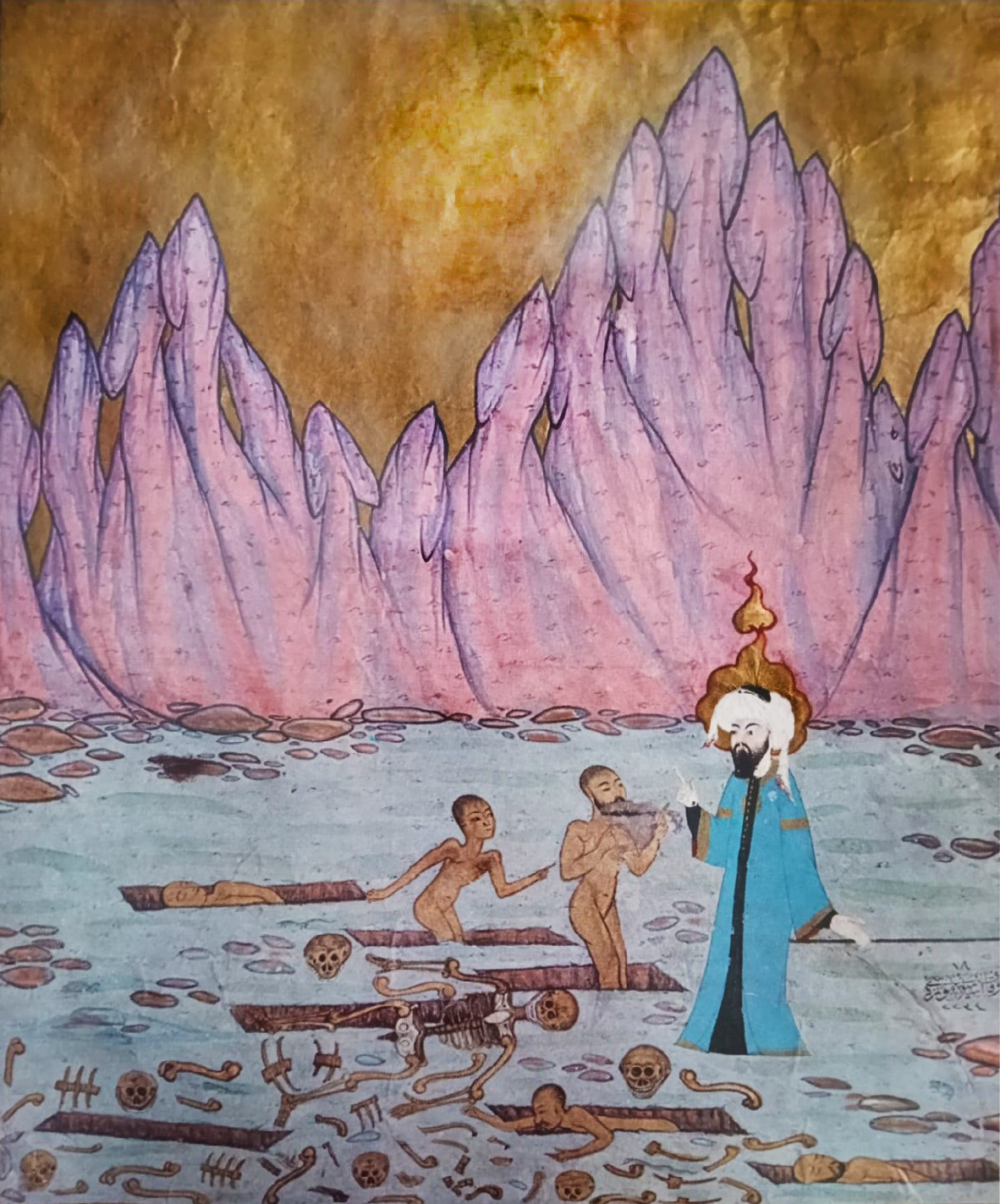
Allah raised the dead at the request of Ezekiel. He is standing in a desert with skulls and bones scattered. He is depicted with a halo in the form of flames, typical in Islamic arts.

Ezekiel (Arabic: حزقيال; "Ḥazqiyāl" (Note: "Ḥazqiyāl" is also romanised as "Ḥizqiyāl", "Ḥizqīl", and "Ḥizkīl")) is recognized as a prophet in Islamic tradition. Although not mentioned by name in the Quran, Muslim scholars, both classical (Note: Ibn Kutayba, Ukasha, Tabari, Ibn Kathir, Ibn Ishaq, Masudi, Kisa'i, Balami, Thalabi and many more have all recognized Ezekiel as a prophet) and modern (Note: The greatest depth to the figure is given by Abdullah Yusuf Ali, in his commentary; his commentary's note 2743: "If we accept "Dhul al Kifl" to be not an epithet, but an Arabicised form of "Ezekiel", it fits the context, Ezekiel was a prophet in Israel who was carried away to Babylon by Nebuchadnezzar after his second attack on Jerusalem (about BCE 599). His Book is included in the English Bible (Old Testament). He was chained and bound, and put into prison, and for a time he was dumb. He bore all with patience and constancy, and continued to reprove boldly the evils in Israel. In a burning passage he denounces false leaders in words which are eternally true: "Woe be to the shepherds of Israel that do feed themselves! Should not the shepherds feed the flocks? Ye eat the fat, and ye clothe you with the wool, ye kill them that are fed: but ye feed not the flock. The diseased have ye not strengthened, neither have ye healed that which was sick, neither have ye bound up that which was broken ...... etc. (Ezekiel, 34:2–4).") have included Ezekiel in lists of the prophets of Islam.

The Quran mentions a prophet called Dhū al-Kifl (Note: "Dhū al-Kifl" is also romanised as "Dhul-Kifl", "Zu al-Kifl", and "Zul-Kifl") (ذو الكفل). Although Dhu al-Kifl's identity is disputed, he is often identified with Ezekiel. Carsten Niebuhr, in his Reisebeschreibung nach Arabien, says he visited al-Kifl in Iraq, midway between Najaf and Hilla and said Kifl was the Arabic form of Ezekiel. He further explained in his book that Ezekiel's Tomb was present in al-Kifl and that the Jews came to it on pilgrimage. The name "Dhu al-Kifl" means "Possessor of the Double" or "Possesor of the Fold" (ذو dhū "possessor of, owner of" and الكفل al-kifl "double, folded"). Some Islamic scholars have likened Ezekiel's mission to the description of Dhu al-Kifl. During the exile, the monarchy and state were annihilated, and political and national life were no longer possible. In the absence of a worldly foundation, it became necessary to build a spiritual one and Ezekiel performed this mission by observing the signs of the time and deducing his doctrines from them. In conformity with the two parts of his book, his personality and his preaching are alike twofold.

Regardless of the identification of Dhu al-Kifl with Ezekiel, Muslims have viewed Ezekiel as a prophet. Ezekiel appears in all collections of Stories of the Prophets. Muslim exegesis further lists Ezekiel's father as Buzi (Budhi) and Ezekiel is given the title ibn al-‘ajūz, denoting "son of the old (man)", as his parents are supposed to have been very old when he was born. A tradition, which resembles that of Hannah and Samuel in the Hebrew Bible, states that Ezekiel's mother prayed to God in old age for the birth of an offspring and was given Ezekiel as a gift from God.

==== Bibliography ====
- Ibn Kutayba, K. al-Ma'arif ed. S. Ukasha, 51
- Tabari, History of the Prophets and Kings, 2, 53–54
- Tabari, Tafsir, V, 266 (old ed. ii, 365)
- Masudi, Murudj, i, 103ff.
- K. al-Badwa l-tarikh, iii, 4/5 and 98/100, Ezechiel
- Abdullah Yusuf Ali, Holy Qur'an: Translation and Commentary, Note. 2473 (cf. index: Ezekiel)
- Emil Heller Henning III, "Ezekiel's Temple: A Scriptural Framework Illustrating the Covenant of Grace", 2012.

== Resting place ==
=== Ezekiel's Tomb, Iraq ===
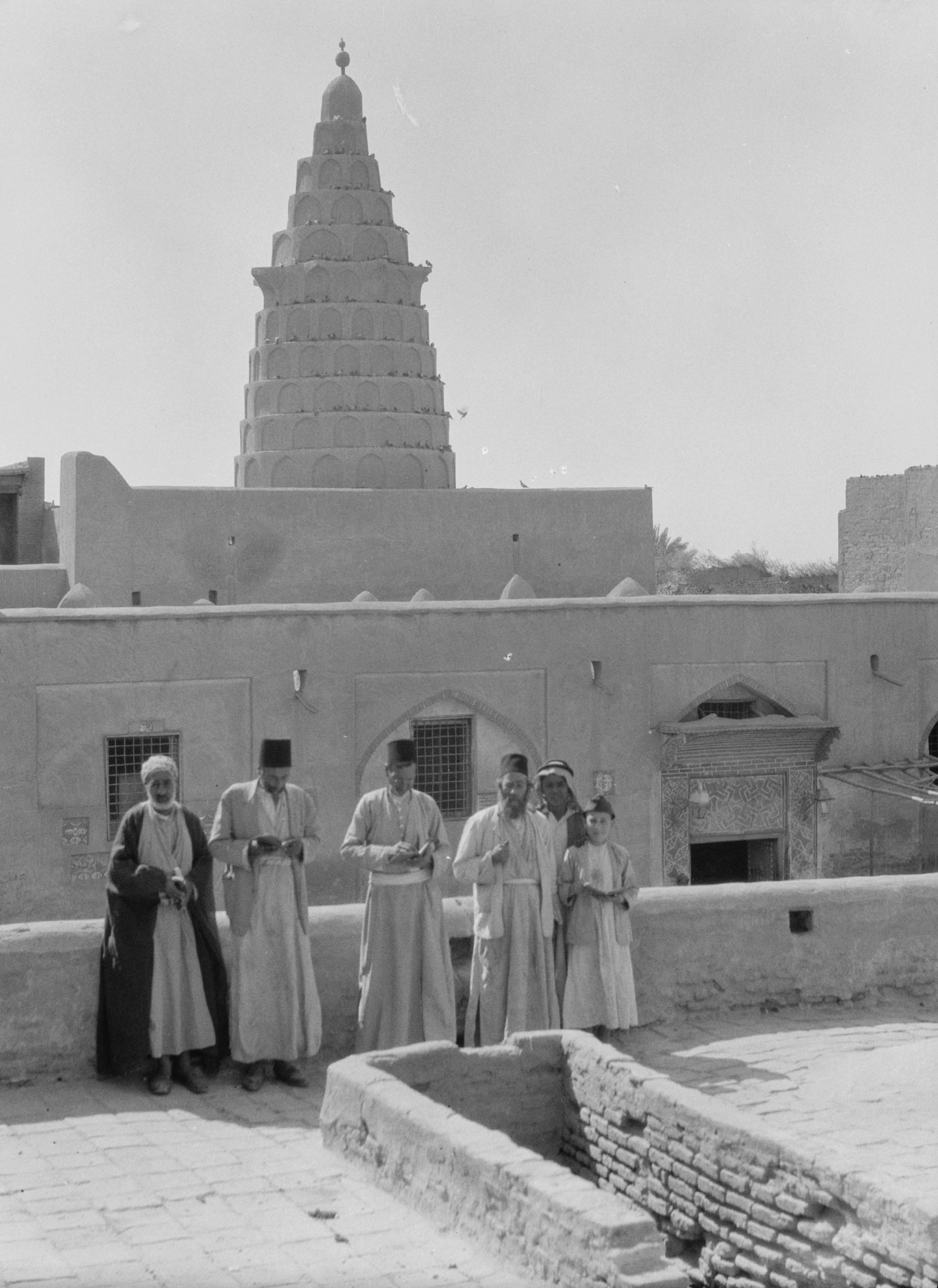
Iraqi Jews at the tomb of Ezekiel in al-Kifl in the 1930s

Ezekiel's Tomb is located in al-Kifl, Iraq, near Babylon. Historically an important Jewish site, the Nukhailah Mosque for Shi'a Muslims was constructed over it. Due to the Jewish exodus from Iraq in the 1950s, the presence of the Iraqi Jewish community has diminished, although a disused synagogue remains in place at the location. In 2020, work was reportedly underway to transform the synagogue into a mosque.

=== Tomb at Ergani, Turkey ===
A tomb in the Ergani District of Diyarbakır Province in Turkey is also believed to be the resting place of Ezekiel. It is located 5 kilometres (3.1 mi) from the city centre on a hill, where it is revered and visited by local Muslims, called Makam Dağı.

== In popular culture ==
Ezekiel is portrayed by Darrell Dunham in a 1979 episode of the television series Our Jewish Roots (1978–).

== See also ==
- Apocryphon of Ezekiel
- Pseudo-Ezekiel
- List of names referring to El
