= Buzi =

Father of the prophet Ezekiel

Buzi (Hebrew: בּוּזִי, Būzī) was the father of Ezekiel and a priest in Jerusalem (Ezekiel 1:3). In rabbincal tradition, Ezekiel, like Jeremiah, is said to have been a descendant of Joshua by his marriage with the proselyte Rahab (Talmud Meg. 14b; Midrash Sifre, Num. 78).

The name Buzi comes from the Hebrew word Buz (בּוּז), meaning "despise." Buz is also a name of the second son of Nahor, therefore making the name "Buzi" potentially mean a "son of Buz" (denoting Buzi most likely being a descendant of Buz son of Nahor or inhabitants of his land).

Because the etymological connection to the word "despise," some traditions argue that Buzi is the same figure as the prophet Jeremiah, who was also called "Buzi" because he was despised—"buz"—by his compatriots in Judah (Targ. Yer., quoted by Ḳimḥi on Ezek. 1:3).
