= Dhu'l-Kifl =

Islamic prophet often identified as Ezekiel

Prophet Dhu'l-Kifl Alayhi as-Salam
- ذُو الْكِفْل; Ezekiel
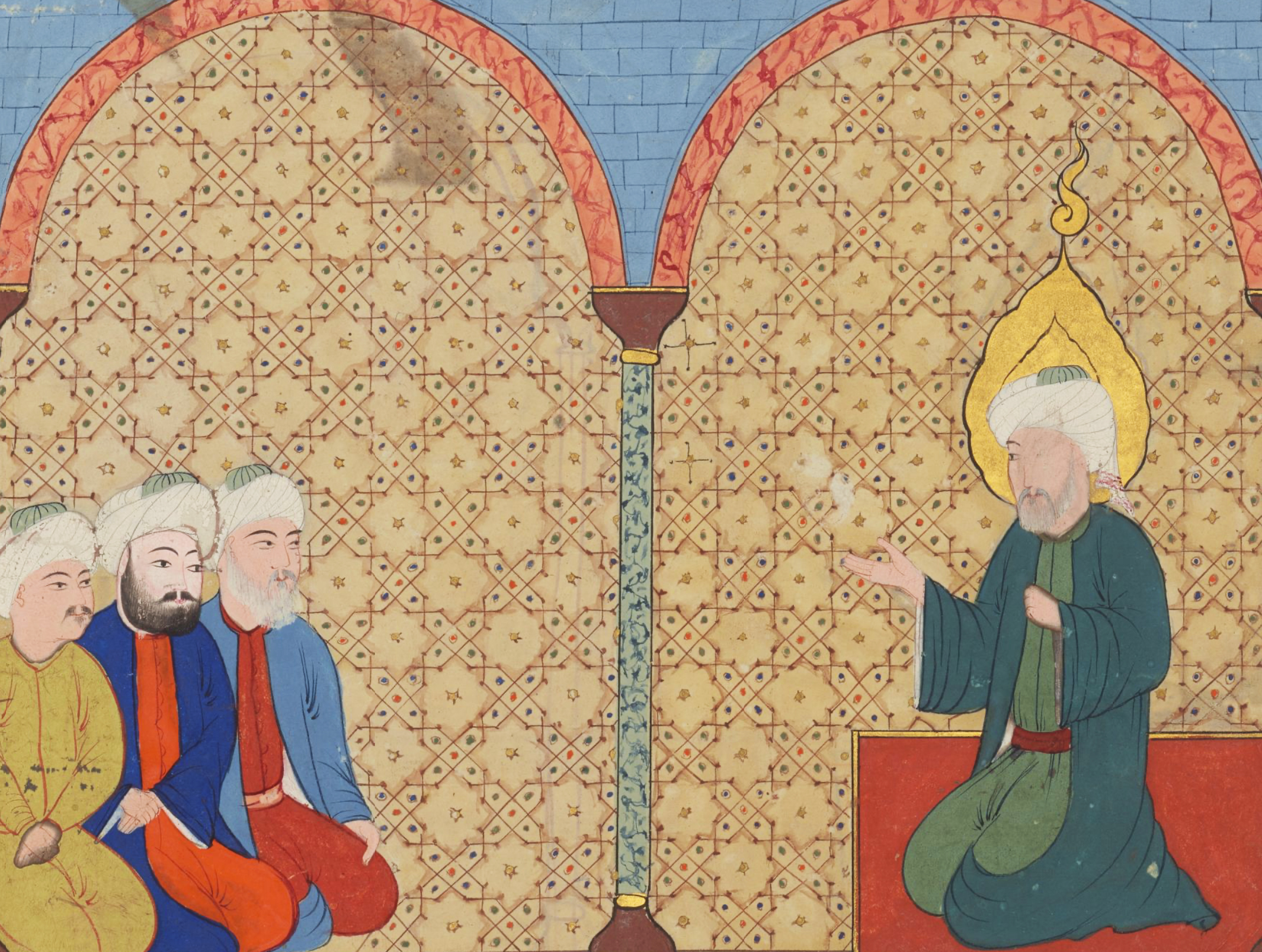
- Dhu'l-Kifl (right) leading a congregation in prayer.

Prophet of Islam
- Preceded by: Irmiyyah
- Succeeded by: Zechariah

Religious life
- Religion: Islam

Dhu'l-Kifl (Arabic: ذُو الْكِفْل, romanized: ḏū l-kifl, lit. 'Possessor of the Portion'), also spelled Dhu al-Kifl, Dhu l-Kifl, Dhul-Kifl, Zu al-Kifl, Zul Kifl, or Zu l-Kifl, is an Islamic prophet. Although his identity is unknown, his identity has been theorised and identified as various Hebrew Bible prophets and other figures, most commonly Ezekiel. Dhu'l-Kifl is believed to have been raised by Allah to a high station in life and is chronicled in the Qur'an as a man of the "Company of the Good". Although not much is known of Dhu'l-Kifl from other historical sources, all the writings from classical commentators, such as Ibn Ishaq and Ibn Kathir, speak of Dhu'l-Kifl as a prophetic, saintly man who remained faithful in daily prayer (Arabic: صلاة, romanized: ṣalāh) and worship (Arabic: عبادة, romanized: ʿibāda).

A tomb in the Ergani province of Diyarbakir, Turkey is believed by some to be the resting place of Dhu'l-Kifl. It is located 5 km from the city centre on a hill called Makam Dağı.

== Etymology ==
The name Dhu'l-Kifl literally means "the possessor of kifl ", using a type of name where ذُو dhū ("possessor of") precedes some characteristically associated feature. Such names were used of other notable figures in the Quran, for example Dhu'l-Qarnayn (Arabic: ذُو ٱلْقَرْنَيْن, lit. 'He of the Two Horns/He of the Two Times'), and Dhu'l-Nun (Arabic: ذُو ٱلْنُّون, lit. 'the One with the Fish'), referring to Yunus. Kifl (Arabic: كِفْل) is an archaic Arabic word meaning "double" or "duplicate", from the root ka-fa-la (ك-ف-ل) meaning "to double" or "to fold"; it was also used for a fold of cloth. The name is generally understood to mean "one of a double portion." Some scholars have suggested that the name means "the man with the double recompense" or rather "the man who received recompense twice over", that is to say that it is a title for Job, as his family was returned to him according to the Qur'an and the Book of Job.

== In the Qur'an ==
Dhu'l-Kifl has been mentioned twice in the Qur'an, in the following verses:

And ˹remember˺ Ishmael, Enoch, and Ⱬul-Kifl. They were all steadfast.
We admitted them into Our mercy, for they were truly of the righteous.

— Surah Al-Anbiya 21:85-86

Also remember Ishmael, Elisha, and Ⱬul-Kifl. All are among the best.

— Surah Sad 38:48

In both cases, Dhu'l-Kifl is mentioned in the context of a list of Qur'anic prophets, including many others not mentioned in the ayatayn quoted above.

== Identifications ==
=== Ezekiel ===
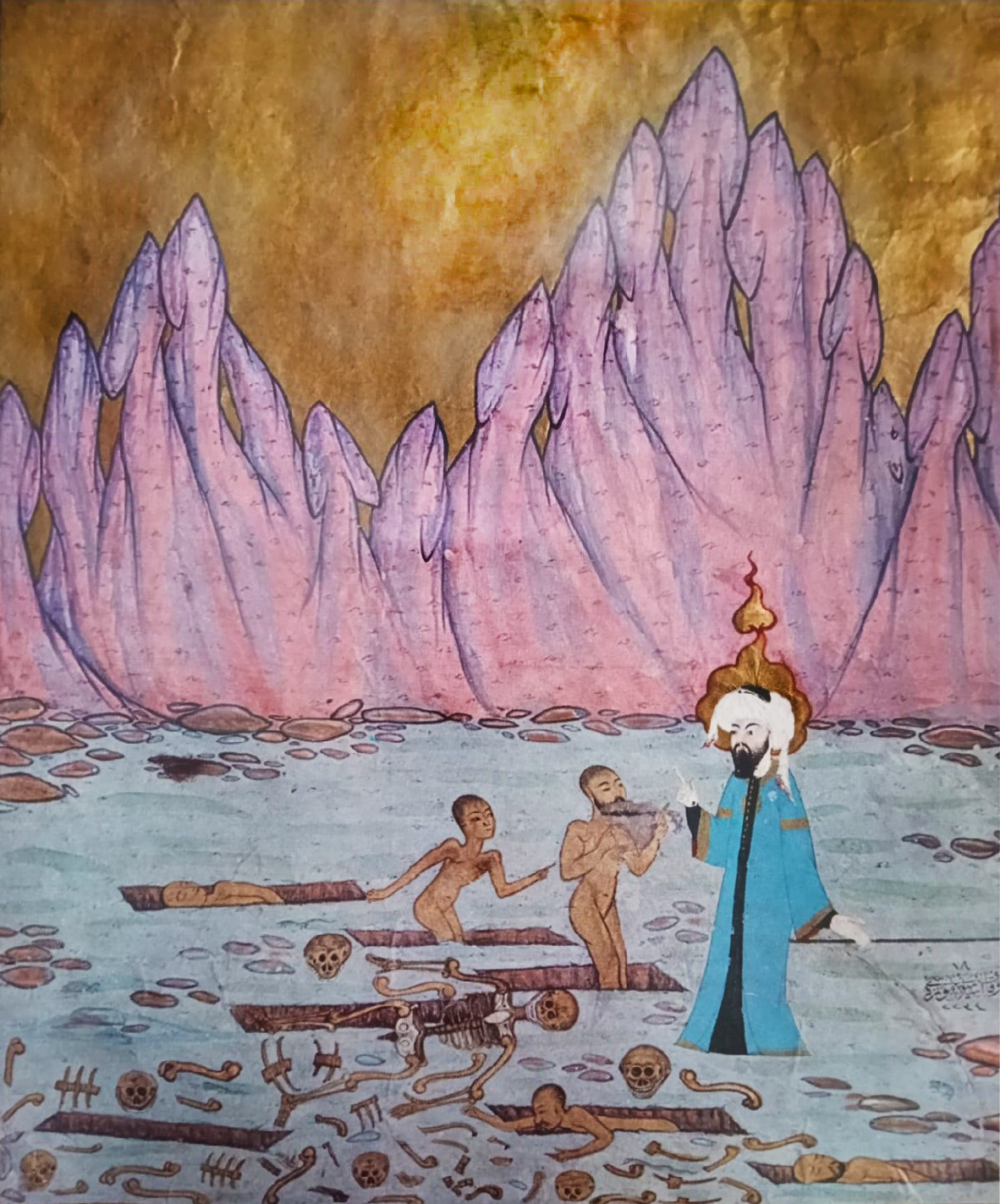
Islamic depiction of Ezekiel raising the dead with God's help.

Some identify Dhu'l-Kifl is Ezekiel. When the exile, monarchy, and state were annihilated, political and national life was no longer possible. In conformity with the two parts of his book, his personality and his preaching are alike, and the title Dhu'l-Kifl means "the one to double" or "to fold."

In a story repeated in a fragment from the Cairo Geniza and a work by the 12th century Jewish scholar Moses ben Jacob of Coucy, the tomb of Ezekiel is at al-Kifl and was visited by Jews.

In his Qur'anic commentary, Abdullah Yusuf Ali says:

Dhu al-Kifl would literally mean "possessor of, or giving, a double requital or portion"; or else, "one who used a cloak of double thickness," that being one of the meanings of Kifl. The commentators differ in opinion as to who is meant, why the title is applied to him. I think the best suggestion is that afforded by Karsten Niebuhr in his Reisebeschreibung nach Arabien, Copenhagen, 1778, ii. 264–266, as quoted in the Encyclopaedia of Islam under Dhul-Kifl. He visited Meshad 'All in 'Iraq, and also the little town called Kifl, midway between Najaf and Hilla (Babylon). Kefil, he says, is the Arabic form of Ezekiel. The shrine of Ezekiel was there, and the Jews came to it on pilgrimage. If we accept "Dhu al-Kifl" to be not an epithet, but an Arabicised form of "Ezekiel", it fits the context, Ezekiel was a prophet in Israel who was carried away to Babylon by Nebuchadnezzar after his second attack on Jerusalem (about B.C. 599). His Book is included in the English Bible (Old Testament). He was chained and bound, and put into prison, and for a time he was dumb. He bore all with patience and constancy, and continued to reprove boldly the evils in Israel. In a burning passage he denounces false leaders in words which are eternally true: "Woe be to the shepherds of Israel that do feed themselves! Should not the shepherds feed the flocks? Ye eat the fat, and ye clothe you with the wool, ye kill them that are fed: but ye feed not the flock. The diseased have ye not strengthened, neither have ye healed that which was sick, neither have ye bound up that which was broken......".

— Abdullah Yusuf Ali, The Holy Qur'an: Text, Translation and Commentary

Al-Kifl is a town in southeastern Iraq on the Euphrates between Najaf and Hillah. Variant names for the shrine within al-Kifl are the Dhu'l-Kifl Shrine, Marqad Dhu'l-Kifl, Qubbat Dhu'l-Kifl, Qabr al-Nabi Dhu'l-Kifl, Dhu'l-Kifl Shrine, Zul-Kifl Shrine, Qabr Hazqiyal, Hazqiyal Shrine. Hazqiyal (Arabic: حزقيال) is the Arabic version of the Hebrew name for Ezekiel, which was mostly utilized by Arabic-speaking Sephardic Jews. This indicates that the Jews equated Ezekiel and Dhu'l-Kifl, and Muslim exegetes followed suit.

The Iraqi authorities assert that in 1316 (715–16 AH), the Il khan Öljaitü acquired the rights of guardianship over the tomb of Dhu'l-Kifl from the Jewish community. Consequently, the shrine was renamed according to the Islamic nomenclature for the same prophet. Öljaitü added to the structure by building a mosque and a minaret and restored the shrine, implementing some alterations made clear by comparing its present state with pre-Ilkhanid travelers' descriptions.

The site remained a Muslim pilgrimage place until the beginning of the nineteenth century, when Menahem ibn Danyal, a wealthy Jew, successfully converted it back to a Jewish site and restored it. The minaret remained as the only witness to its tenure as an Islamic site. Although the mosque and minaret were built in the 14th century, the antiquity of the shrine and grave cannot be determined.

=== Others ===
Dhu'l-Kifl has also been identified variously with Joshua, Obadiah, Isaiah, and even Gautama Buddha.

== See also ==
- Biblical and Qur'anic narratives
- List of legends in the Qur'an
- Prophets and messengers in Islam
- Qisas al-Anbiya
