= Al-Hilla District =

District of Iraq

Coordinates: 32.3958°N 44.36279°E

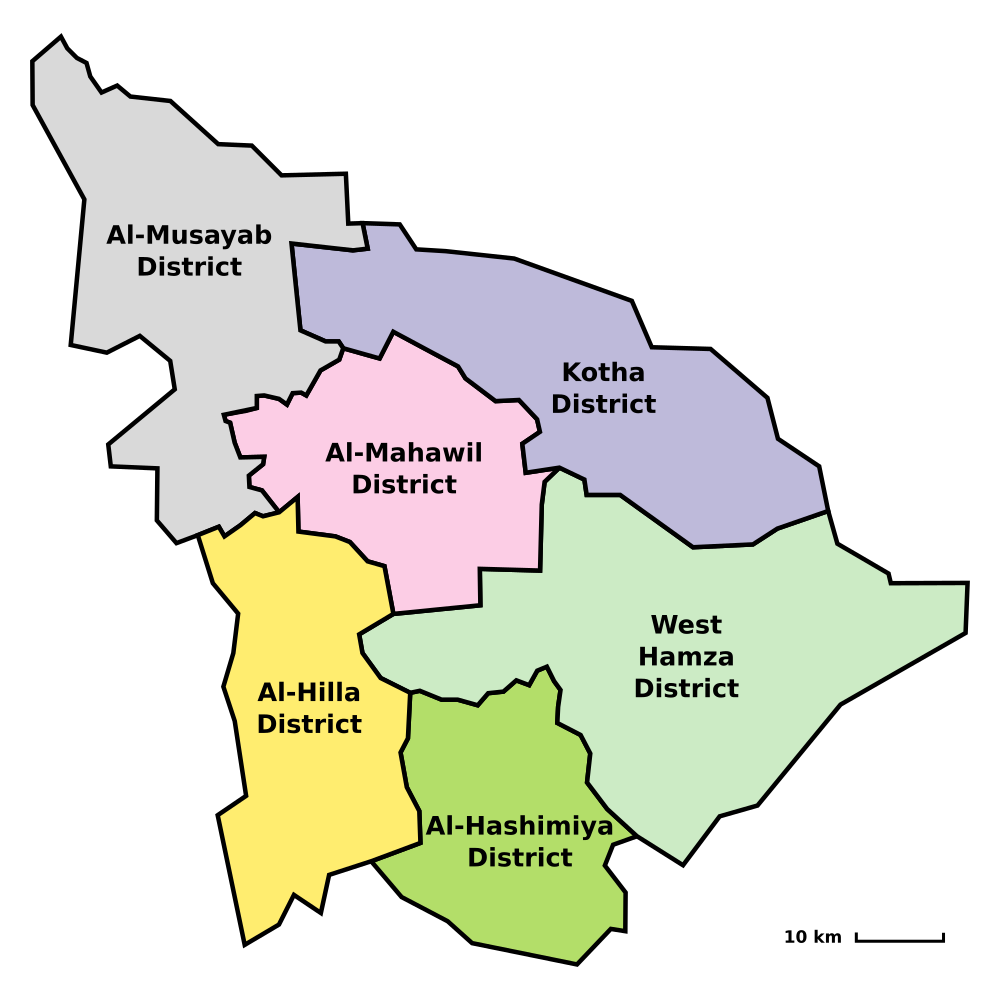
Map of Babil Governorate showing districts

Al-Hillah (الحلة) is a district in Babil Governorate, Iraq. It is centred on the city of Al Hillah.

Al-Hillah covers 908 km², its population is 857,804 as of 2015 which makes it the most densely populated in Babil Governorate.

== Cities ==
- Al Hillah
- Al Sahlan
