= Orthodox Christianity in Iraq =

The term Orthodox Christianity in Iraq may refer to:

- Eastern Orthodox Christianity in Iraq, representing communities and institutions of Eastern Orthodox Church, in Iraq
- Oriental Orthodox Christianity in Iraq, representing communities and institutions of Oriental Orthodox Church, in Iraq

== See also ==
- Orthodox Christianity (disambiguation)
- Orthodoxy in Iraq (disambiguation)
- Iraq (disambiguation)
