= Irreligion in Iraq =

Irreligion in Iraq has a societal, political and historical background. Although the Constitution of Iraq guarantees freedom from religious coercion and states that all citizens are equal before the law without regard to religion, sect, or belief, irreligious people may encounter difficulties with the authorities. Another source of the problem is usually the community and family, with reactions varying from one family to another. The “Global Index of Religiosity and Atheism” listed Iraq as one of six countries as having the lowest rate of atheism in 2012. After six years, with religious figures coming to power, the situation changed rapidly as the tide of religiosity receded. According to various Iraqi thinkers, this occurred after the religious politicians came to power, and their role in sectarianism and state corruption, and by regularly occupying television slots to spread their agendas. The increasing prevalence of atheism and agnosticism signals a tidal public opinion change.

There are no exact numbers, as atheists fear persecution, especially from religious militias and many fear telling their families or friends about their beliefs. An unknown number of Iraqis left Islam due to religious terrorism and corruption of Islamic politicians, especially after many conflicts.

== List of non–religious Iraqis ==
- Amir Ashour Iraqi LGBTQIA+ activist.
- Faisal Saeed Al Mutar Iraqi-born satirist, human-rights activist and writer who was admitted to the United States as a refugee in 2013.
- Ma'ruf al-Rusafi Considered a national poet of Iraq, he was a Sunni Muslim imam, and later became an atheist.
- Bashshar ibn Burd Poet of the late Umayyad and early Abbasid periods.
- Rifat Chadirji Iraqi architect, photographer, author and activist. He is admired as the greatest modern architect of Iraq, and taught at the Baghdad School of Architecture for many years.
- Sami Michael Iraqi-Israeli author, first in Israel to call for the creation of an independent Palestinian state to exist alongside Israel.
- Khazal Al Majidi Iraqi scholar of religion and ancient civilizations.
- Jim Al-Khalili Iraqi-British theoretical physicist, author and broadcaster.
- Selim Matar Writer, novelist and sociologist with Swiss and Iraqi nationalities, was born in Baghdad and resides currently in Geneva.

== See also ==
- Islam in Iraq
- Christianity in Iraq
- Demographics of Iraq
- Freedom of religion in Iraq
- Religion in Iraq
