= Iraqis =

People of Iraq

العراقيون (Arabic)
- Map of the Iraqi diaspora, including people of full or partial Iraqi origin and their descendants

Regions with significant populations
- Iraq
- 46,100,000
- United Kingdom: 350,000–450,000
- Germany: 380,000
- Sweden: 245,586
- Iran: 203,000
- United Arab Emirates: 200,000
- United States: 155,055
- Jordan: 131,000
- Australia: 104,170
- Lebanon: 90,000
- Netherlands: 85,000
- Canada: 84,130
- Finland: 26,653
- France: 14,500
- Austria: 13,000+

Languages
- Majority: Iraqi Arabic; Minority: Kurdish, Turkmen Turkic, Neo-Aramaic, Assyrian, Armenian, Mandaic, Shabaki, Domari, etc. (See: Languages of Iraq)

Religion
- Majority: Islam (~95%) (Note: ~64% Shia and ~34% Sunni.); Minority: Christianity (1%), (Note: Church of the East, Oriental Orthodox, Eastern Orthodox, Eastern Catholic, etc.); Yazidism, Mandaeism,Yarsanism, Judaism, etc. (See: Religion in Iraq)

Related ethnic groups
- Other Middle Eastern ethnic groups

Iraqis (Arabic: العراقيون al-ʿIrāqiyyūn) are the citizens and nationals of the Republic of Iraq. The majority of Iraqis are Arabs (split between Sunni Arabs mostly in the north/west and Shia Arabs in the south), followed by ethnic minorities mainly in the north (Kurds in the Kurdistan Region, followed by Turkmen, and others including Yazidis, Chaldo-Assyrians and Mandaeans). Approximately 95% of Iraqis adhere to Islam, with nearly 64% of this figure consisting of Shia Muslims and the remainder consisting of Sunni Muslims. The largest minority religion is Christianity at 1%, while other religions collectively represent as much as 4% of the Iraqi populace.

The territory of modern-day Iraq largely overlaps with what was historically known as Mesopotamia, which was home to many noteworthy civilizations, such as Sumer, Akkad, Assyria, and Babylonia. The fall of these native Mesopotamian civilizations, particularly Babylon in the 6th century BC, marked the beginning of centuries-long foreign conquests and rule. Recent studies showed that two individuals from the same group (Iraqi Arab or Iraqi Kurd) could differ more genetically from each other than the average genetic difference between Iraqi Arabs and Iraqi Kurds as populations.

Arabic and Kurdish are Iraq's two official languages; Mesopotamian Arabic is the Iraqi Arabic variety, having emerged in the aftermath of the Arab conquest of Mesopotamia in the 7th century. The process of Arabization and Islamization that began during the medieval era resulted in the decline of various Eastern Aramaic languages and local religions, most notably during the Abbasid Caliphate, when the city of Baghdad became the capital of the Muslim world and the centre of the Islamic Golden Age. Mesopotamian Arabic is considered to be the most Aramaic-influenced dialect of Arabic, as Aramaic originated in Mesopotamia and spread throughout the Fertile Crescent during the Neo-Assyrian period, eventually becoming the lingua franca of the entire region prior to the early Muslim conquests. Other languages spoken within the Iraqi community include Turkmen Turkic, Neo-Aramaic, and Mandaic.

== History ==
In ancient and medieval times Mesopotamia was the political and cultural centre of many great empires and civilizations, such as the Akkadian Empire, Assyria, Assyrian Empire and Babylonian Empire. The ancient Mesopotamian civilization of Sumer is the oldest known civilization in the world, and thus Iraq is widely known as the Cradle Of Civilization. Iraq remained an important centre of civilization for millennia, up until the Muslim conquest of Mesopotamia and subsequently Abbasid Caliphate (of which Baghdad was the capital), which was the most advanced empire of the medieval world (see Islamic Golden Age). Hence, Mesopotamia has witnessed many periods of emigration and immigration in the past.

Further information on Iraq's civilization and cultural history can be found in the following chronology of Iraqi history:

- Nemrik 9 (9800 BC – 8200 BC)
- Jarmo (7000 – 5000 BC)
- Sumer (6500 – 1940 BC)

- Ubaid period (6500 – 4000 BC)
- Uruk period (4000 – 3000 BC)
- Early Dynastic period (3000 – 2334 BC)

- Sumer and Akkad (1900 – 539 BC)

- Akkadian Empire (2334 – 2218 BC)
- Gutian dynasty (2218 – 2047 BC)
- Neo-Sumerian Empire (2047 – 1940 BC)

- Akkadian era

- Babylonia (1900 - 539 BC)
- Assyria (1900 – 609 BC)
- Neo-Assyrian Empire (745 – 626 BC)
- Neo-Babylonian Empire (626 – 539 BC)
- Fall of Babylon (539 BC)

- Achaemenid Empire (539 – 330 BC)

- Achaemenid Assyria (539 – 330 BC)

- Seleucid Babylonia (331 – 141 BC)
- Parthian Babylonia (141 BC – 224)

- Characene (141 BC – 222)
- Araba (100 BC – 240)
- Adiabene (15 – 116)

- Sassanid Persia (224 – 638)

- Asuristan (224 – 638)
- Arbayistan (262 – 638)
- Lakhmids (266 – 633)

- Islamic conquest (632 – 1258)

- Rashidun Caliphate (638 – 661)
- Umayyad Caliphate (661 – 750)
- Abbasid Caliphate (750 – 1258)

- Ilkhanate (1258 – 1335)
- Turkic dynasties (1335 – 1501)

- Jalayirid Sultanate (1335 – 1410)
- Kara Koyunlu (1410 – 1468)
- Ak Koyunlu (1468 – 1501)

- Safavid dynasty (1501 – 1533)
- Ottoman Iraq (1533 – 1918)

- Mamluk dynasty (1747 – 1831)

- British Mandate for Mesopotamia (1920 – 1932)
  Mandatory Iraq (1920 – 1932)
- Kingdom of Iraq (1932 – 1958)
- Republic of Iraq (1958 – present)

- Iraqi Republic (1958 – 1968)
- Ba'athist Iraq (1968 – 2003)

== Genetics ==
One study found that Haplogroup J-M172 originated in northern Iraq. In spite of the importance of this region, genetic studies on the Iraqi people are limited and generally restricted to analysis of classical markers due to Iraq's modern political instability, although there have been several published studies displaying a genealogical connection between all Iraqi peoples and the neighboring countries, across religious, ethnic and linguistic barriers. Studies indicate that the different ethno-religious groups of Iraq (Mesopotamia) share significant similarities in genetics and that Mesopotamian Arabs, who make up the majority of Iraqis, Genetic analysis indicates that Iraqi Arabs have the smallest genetic distance to Iraqi Kurds, and show similarly close affinities to Yemenis and Kuwaitis.

No significant differences in Y-DNA variation were observed among Iraqi Mesopotamian Arabs, Assyrians, or Kurds. Modern genetic studies indicate that Iraqi Arabs and Iraqi Kurds are distantly related, though Iraqi Mesopotamian Arabs are more related to Iraqi-Assyrians than they are to Iraqi Kurds.

For both mtDNA and Y-DNA variation, the large majority of the haplogroups observed in the Iraqi population (H, J, T, and U for the mtDNA, J-M172 and J-M267 for the Y-DNA) are those considered to have originated in Western Asia and to have later spread mainly in West Asia. The Eurasian haplogroups R1b and R1a represent the second most frequent component of the Iraqi Y-chromosome gene pool, the latter suggests that the population movements from Central Asia into modern Iran also influenced Iraq.

Many historians and anthropologists provide strong circumstantial evidence to posit that Iraq's Marsh Arabs share very strong links to the ancient Sumerians—the oldest human civilization in the world and most ancient inhabitants of central-southern Iraq.

The Iraqi-Assyrian population was found to be significantly related to other Iraqis, especially Mesopotamian Arabs, likely due to the assimilation of indigenous Assyrians with other people groups who occupied and settled Mesopotamia after the fall of the Neo-Babylonian Empire.

According to Dogan et al. (2017), the most prevalent lineages among north Iraqis are J1 (17.98%), R1b (12.81%), R1a (12.40%) and J2a1b (12.19%) but distributions vary according to ethnicity. 14 different haplogroups were observed in Iraqi Arabs, with the three most common being J1 (38.61%), R1a (12.87%) and T (8.91%). The high prevalence of J1 is indicative of the indigeneity of Iraqi Arabs, which is similarly observed in Marsh Arabs. Prevalence of R and J macrohaplogroups is also attributed to pre-Last Glacial Maximum events in the Near East. Meanwhile, 15 different haplogroups were observed in Kurds, with the three most common being J2a1b (20.20%), J1 / R1a (17.17%) and E1b1b (13.13%). 10 different haplogroups were observed in Syriacs, with the three most common being R1b (30.23%), T (17.44%) and J2a1b (15.12%). 16 different haplogroups were observed in Turkmens, with the three most common being E1b1b (17.53%), J1 / J2a1b / R1a (12.37%) and G2a (10.31%). 11 different haplogroups were observed in Yazidis, with the three most common being R1b (20.79%), L (11.88%) and G2a / J2a1x J2a1b/h (10.89%).

== Languages ==
Iraq's national languages are Arabic and Kurdish. The two main regional dialects of Arabic spoken by the Iraqi people are Mesopotamian Arabic (spoken in the Babylonian alluvial plain and Middle Euphrates valley) and South Mesopotamian Arabic and North Mesopotamian Arabic (spoken in the Assyrian highlands). The two main dialects of Kurdish spoken by Kurdish people are Central Kurdish (spoken in the Erbil and Sulaymaniyah Governorates) and Northern Kurdish (spoken in Dohuk Governorate). In addition to Arabic, most Assyrians and Mandaeans speak Neo-Aramaic languages. Mesopotamian Arabic has an Aramaic substratum.

== Demographics ==
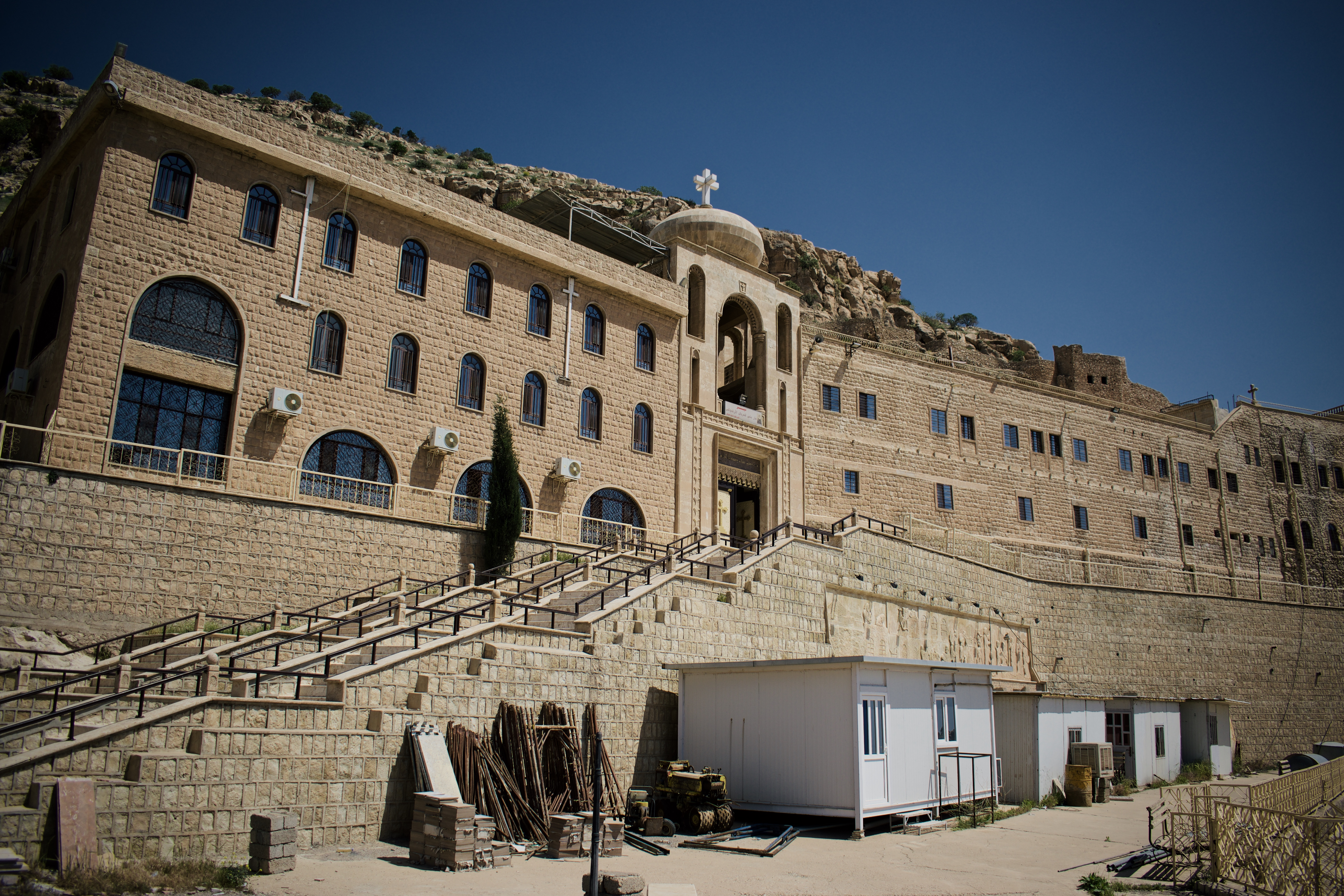
Mor Mattai Monastery

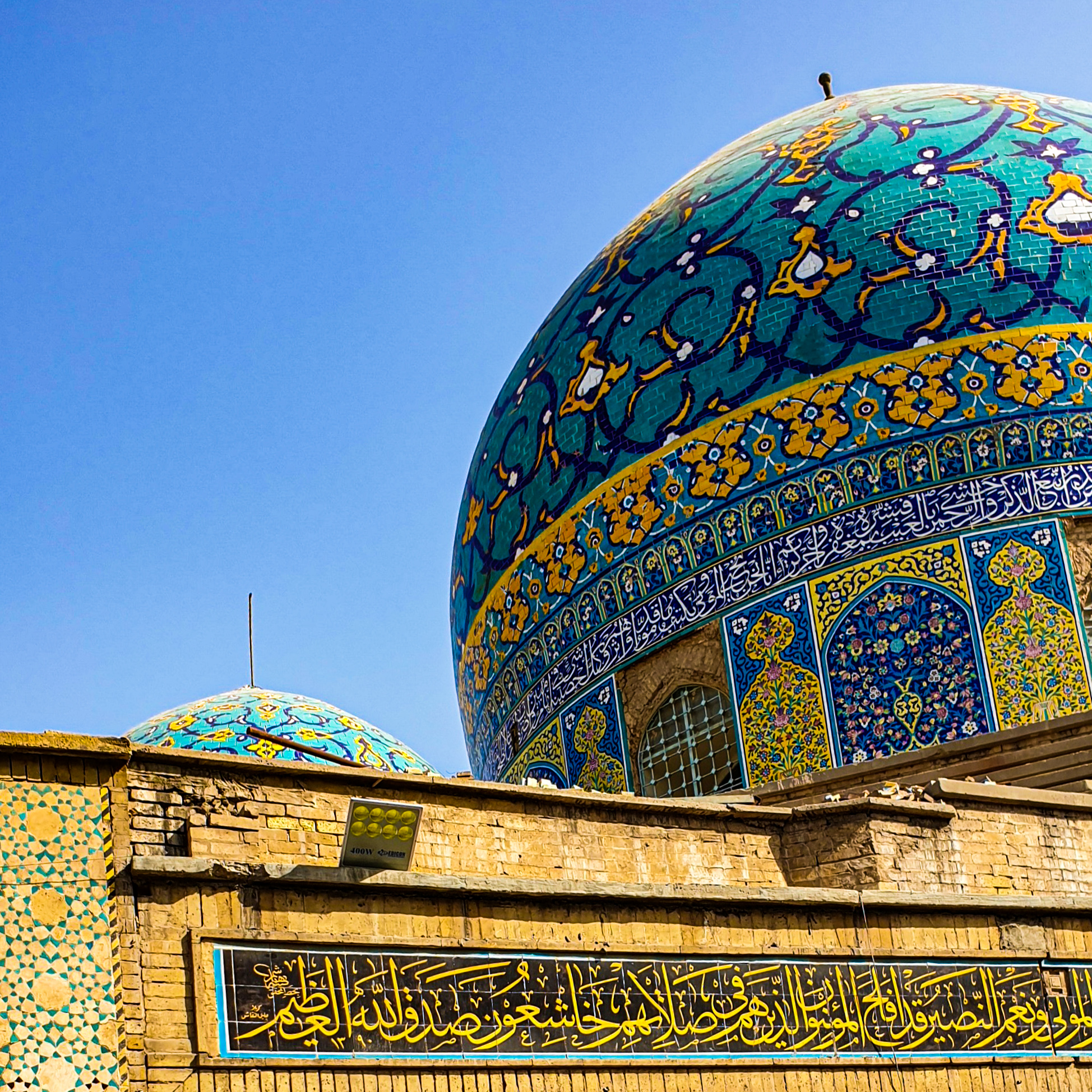
Haydar-Khana Mosque

=== Ethnicities ===
Iraq's population was estimated to be 39,650,145 in 2021 (residing in Iraq). Arabs are the majority ethnic group in Iraq, at around 80%. The Kurds are the largest ethnic minority. Turkmens are the third largest ethnic group in the country. This is followed by Assyrians and Armenians (500,000), Yazidis (500,000), Marsh Arabs (20,000), Shabaks (250,000), and Persians (300,000-500,000). Other minorities include Mandaeans (6,000), Roma (50,000) and Circassians (2,000). The most spoken language is Mesopotamian Arabic, followed by Kurdish, Iraqi Turkmen dialects and Syriac. The percentages of different ethno-religious groups residing in Iraq vary from source to source due to the last Iraqi census having taken place over 30 years ago. A new census of Iraq was planned to take place in 2020.

=== Religions ===
Iraqis are diverse in their faiths. Over 95% of Iraqis are Muslim, divided between 55% Shias and 40% Sunnis. In 1968 the Iraqi constitution established Islam as the official religion of the state.

Religion in Iraq (2019)
1. Islam (95.0%)
2. Yazidism (1.25%)
3. Christianity (1.25%)
4. others (incl.Yarsanism, Zoroastrianism, Baháʼí, Mandaeism, Irreligion) (2.00%)

In addition, Christianity in Iraq consists of various denominations. The majority of Iraqi Christians are Chaldean Catholic Assyrians, whilst non-Syriac Christians are mostly Iraqi Arabs and Armenians. Iraqi-Assyrians largely belong to the Syriac Orthodox Church, the Assyrian Church of the East, Chaldean Catholic Church, Ancient Church of the East, and the Syriac Catholic Church. Iraqi Arab Christians belong to the Greek Orthodox Church of Antioch and the Melkite Greek Catholic Church of Antioch, and Iraqi-Armenians belong to the Armenian Orthodox Church and Armenian Catholic Church. Their numbers inside Iraq have dwindled to around 500,000+ since 2003.

Other religious groups include Mandaeans, Shabaks, Yazidis and followers of other minority religions. Furthermore, Jews had also been present in Iraq in significant numbers historically, and Iraq had the largest Jewish population in the Middle East, but their population dwindled, after virtually all of them migrated to Israel between 1949 and 1952. From 1949 to 1951, 104,000 Jews were evacuated from Iraq in Operations Ezra and Nechemia (named after the Jewish leaders who took their people back to Jerusalem from exile in Babylonia beginning in 597 B.C.E.); another 20,000 were smuggled out through Iran.

== Diaspora ==
The Iraqi diaspora is not a sudden exodus but one that has grown rapidly through the 20th century as each generation faced some form of radical transition or political conflict. From 1950 to 1952, Iraq saw a great exodus of roughly 120,000–130,000 of its Jewish population under the Israel-led "Operation Ezra and Nehemiah". There were at least two large waves of expatriation of both Christians and Muslims alike. A great number of Iraqis left the country during the regime of Saddam Hussein and large numbers have left during the Iraq war and its aftermath.

== See also ==
- Demographics of Iraq
- List of Iraqis
