= Christianity in Kuwait =

Christianity in Kuwait (2020)
1. Catholicism 80 (78.0%)
2. Orthodox 18 (17.5%)
3. Protestantism 2.5 (2.44%)
4. Independent Christian 1.5 (1.46%)
5. Other Christian 0.6 (0.58%)

Christianity is the second-largest religion in Kuwait.

In 2020, there were an estimated 289 Christian Kuwaitis residing in Kuwait. Along with an estimated 837,585 non-citizen Christians, or 17.93% of the population.

A 2015 study estimates some 350 Christians in Kuwait who are former Muslims.

== Kuwaiti Christians ==
Kuwait and Bahrain are the only Gulf Cooperation Council countries to have a local Christian population who hold citizenship.

Christian Kuwaitis can be divided into two groups. The first group includes the earliest, who were Iraqi Christian (Assyrian and Arab/Antiochian Greek) immigrants and their local-born descendants. They have assimilated into Kuwaiti society, like their Muslim counterparts, and tend to speak Arabic with a Kuwaiti dialect; their food and culture are also predominantly Kuwaiti. They make up less than a quarter of Kuwait's Christian population. The rest (roughly three-quarters) of Christian Kuwaitis make up the second group. They are more recent arrivals in the 1950s and 1960s, mostly Kuwaitis of Palestinian ancestry who fled the British Mandatory Palestine due to the 1948 Arab-Israeli war and decided to settle in Kuwait. There are also smaller numbers who originally hail from Syria and Lebanon. This second group is not as assimilated as the first group, as their food, culture, and Arabic dialect still retain a Levant feel. However, they are just as patriotic as the former group, and tend to be proud of their adopted homeland, with many serving in the army, police, civil, and foreign service. Most of Kuwait's Christian citizens belong to 12 large families, with the Shammas (from Turkey) and the Shuhaibars (from Palestine) being some of the more prominent ones.

Although there is a small community of Christian citizens, a law passed in 1981 prevents the naturalization of non-Muslims; however, male citizens who were Christians before 1980 (and male children born to families of such citizens since that date), can transmit their citizenship to their children.

Traditionally, Eastern Orthodox Christians in Kuwait belong to the jurisdiction of Eastern Orthodox Patriarchate of Antioch and All the East. Eastern Orthodox parish in Kuwait was reorganized in 1969 by late metropolitan Constantine Papastephanou of Baghdad and Kuwait (1969-2014), who visited Kuwait on many occasions. His successor is Metropolitan Ghattas Hazim of Baghdad and Kuwait (since 2014). His official seat remains in Baghdad, but administrative headquarters of the Archdiocese are located in Kuwait. Today, Eastern Orthodox parishes in Kuwait are administered by priests Ephrem Toumi and Filimon Saifi.

=== Notable people ===
- Amanuel Benjamin Ghareeb (born 1950), an important Kuwaiti pastor and representative of the Evangelical Church of Kuwait. He is the first Gulf Arab to become head of a Protestant church.

== Expatriate Christians ==
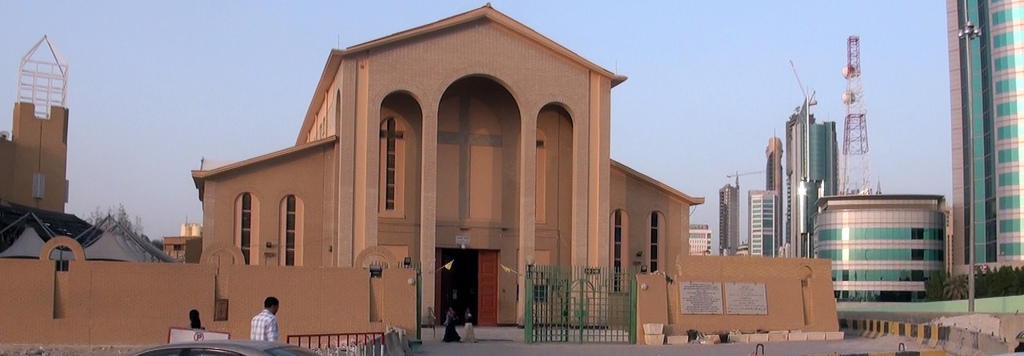
Holy Family Cathedral, Kuwait City.

The denominations of both citizen and foreign Christians in Kuwait include, but are not limited to, the following:

- 75,000 Catholics in Kuwait. There is a cathedral in Kuwait City, which belongs to the Vicariate Apostolic of Kuwait. The Catholic Vicariate is largely made up of Asians from the Malay-speaking countries (Malaysia, Brunei, Singapore, Indonesia), the Philippines, Sri Lanka, Bangladesh, India and Pakistan, and Arab Christians from Lebanon (Maronite and Melkite rites), Egypt (Coptic rite), Jordan, Palestine and Syria (Syriac and Melkite rites). Maronite Christians, mostly from Lebanon, also worship at the Catholic cathedral in Kuwait City. A small group of Catholics are from Europe and the Americas, as well as Greek Catholics.
- 200,000 Orthodox Christians, at least. The Greek Orthodox Church has about 3,500 members, while the Armenian Orthodox Church has about 4,000 members. The Coptic Orthodox Church has about 60,000 members. Totals for both the Greek Catholic (Eastern Rite) Church membership and Indian Orthodox Church membership are more than 60,000. The Ethiopian and Russian Orthodox Churches have a membership of 70,000. The Mar Thoma Syrian Church has a membership of about 40,000. The Syrian Orthodox Church has a membership of about 20,000. So, Chalcedonian Orthodox (AKA Eastern Orthodox) are members of the Greek and Russian Churches, while the rest are non-Chalcedonian Christians.
- The Anglican Church has about 115 members. The National Evangelical Church of Kuwait has about 15,000 members. There are also a number of other Protestant denominations in the country. These denominations include the India Pentecostal Church of God, Assemblies of God in India, The Church of Pentecost, Church of God (Full Gospel) in India, The Pentecostal Mission, Seventh-day Adventist Church.
- Other religious groups include the Church of Jesus Christ of Latter-day Saints (LDS Church), which has a ward (congregation) of approximately 300 that meets in a villa in Salmiyah.

== Churches ==
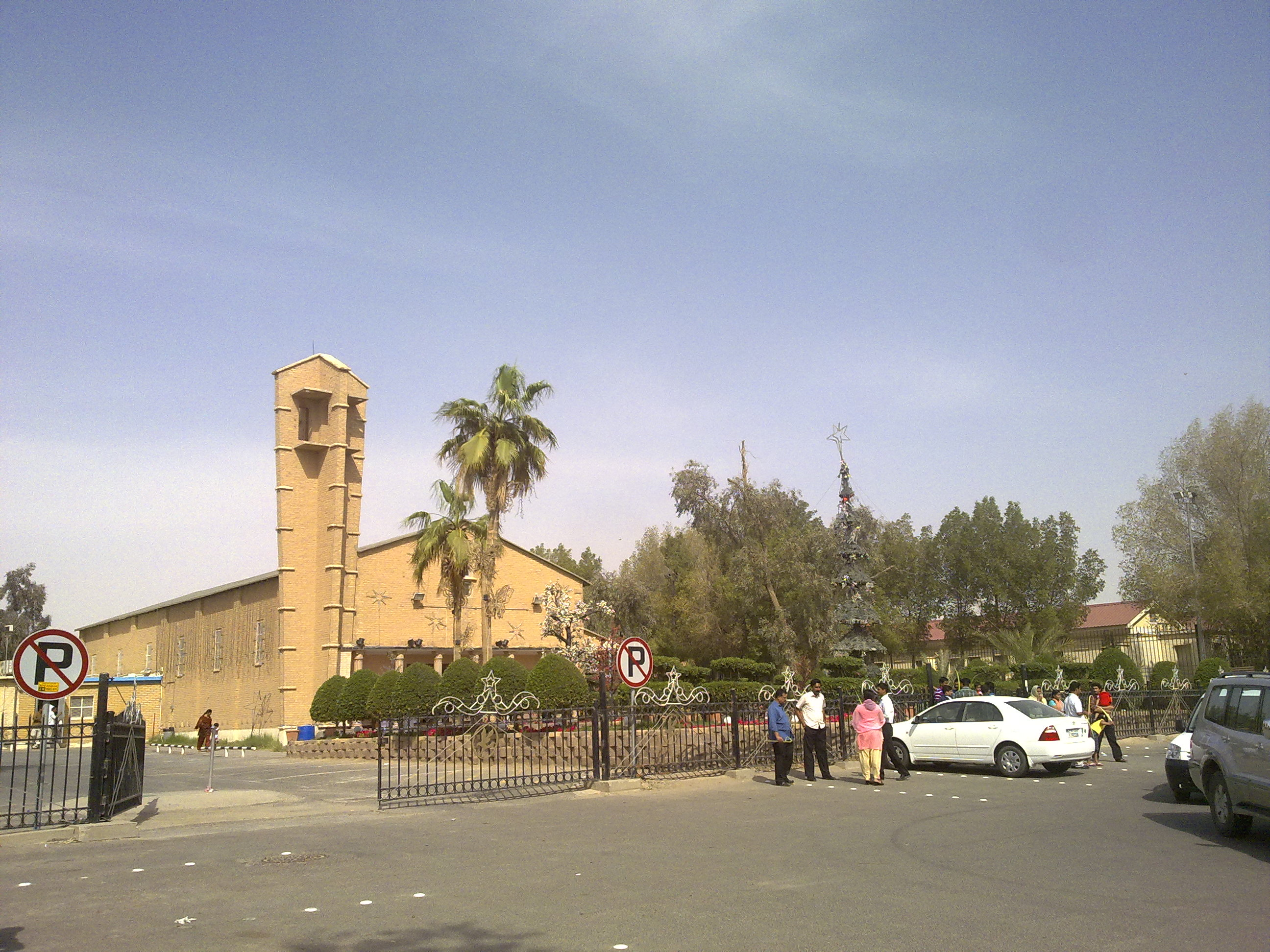
Our Lady of Arabia Parish, Ahmadi

In 2012 the country had 7 official churches and 18 non-official churches, with Kuwait's largest cathedral being situated in the eastern part of Kuwait city.

== See also ==
- Catholic Church in Kuwait
- Christianity in the Middle East
- Christianity in Eastern Arabia
- Arab Christians

== Sources ==
- Catholic Church website
- St Georgios Indian Orthodox Church
