= Orthodoxy in Iraq =

Orthodoxy in Iraq may refer to:

- Eastern Orthodoxy in Iraq
- Oriental Orthodoxy in Iraq
