= Greek Orthodox Archdiocese of Baghdad, Kuwait and Dependencies =

Archdiocese of the Antioch Orthodox Church

Archdiocese of Baghdad, Kuwait and Dependencies

Location
- Country: Iraq, Kuwait, Oman
- Headquarters: Baghdad, Iraq

Information
- Language: Greek, Arabic, English

Current leadership
- Patriarch: Patriarch of Antioch John X
- Metropolitan: Ghattas (Hazim)

Website
- https://gocarch.info/

The Archdiocese of Baghdad, Kuwait and Dependencies (Arabic: أبرشية بغداد والكويت وتوابعهما, romanized: aburshyyatu baghdādi wa l-kuwa yti wa tawabiʿihimā) is an archdiocese of the Antiochian Orthodox Church. It has been headed by Metropolitan Ghattas Hazim since 2014. Its territory includes Iraq, Kuwait, and Muscat. The diocese also runs the Al-Farah Elementary and Kindergarten school in Baghdad.

== History ==
Christianity has had a presence in what is modern day Iraq for centuries. The current diocese was formed out of the fallout of the Schism of 1054.

Most Orthodox Christians arrived in the 20th century. In 1914, many persecuted Assyrians settled in Baghdad trying to escape the Assyrian genocide. In 1942, the church was restructured so that the diocese of Baghdad fell under the authority of the Patriarch of Antioch. In 1953, with the election of metropolitan Photius Al-Khoury, the first church that was built in the diocese's history, referred to by the locals as the "Blue Church" due to its distinctive paint, was completed - it would be consecrated in 2002. A second church was built on land that was given to the diocese in 1972 and was consecrated in 1991.

By 2003, most Christians in Iraq have fled the country. In 1991 there were a reported 600 Greek Orthodox families in Baghdad - by 2014 no more than 30 remained. As of 2018, there are no more Christian households in Mosul or Basra.

== List of bishops ==
- Photius Al-Khoury (1953 - 1969)
- Constantine Papastefanou (1969 - 2014)
- Ghattas Hazim (2014–present)

== See also ==
- Christian Arabs
- Eastern Orthodoxy in Iraq
