= Mir Basri =

Iraqi statesman (1911–2006)

- مير بصري
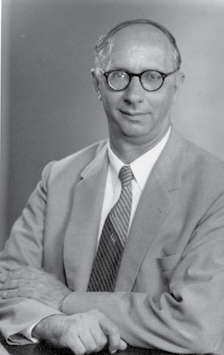

Head of Jewish community of Iraq
- In office 1971–1974
- Preceded by: Sassoon Khadouri
- Succeeded by: Naji Salman Salih

President of the Jewish community
- In office 1960–1971

Personal details
- Born: 19 September 1911 Baghdad, Ottoman Empire
- Died: 4 January 2006 (aged 94) London, United Kingdom
- Spouse: Marcelle Haroun Masri
- Education: University of Baghdad

Mir (also transliterated as Me'īr and Meer) S. Baṣrī (Arabic: مير بصري; 1911-2006) was an Iraqi writer, economist, journalist, politician and poet. Among many public positions he held, Basri served as the head and central leader of Iraqi and Baghdad's Jewish community.

== Early life ==
Basri was born on 19 September 1911 in Baghdad to Shaool Basri and Farha Dangoor (the daughter of the Chief Rabbi of Baghdad, Ezra Reuben Dangoor). His father was a cloth merchant in Baghdad, and his uncle was the head of the Sharia court in Baghdad in 1848 AD. Basri was educated Baghdad at al-Ta'awun and the Alliance school where he studied Hebrew, English, and French. Following his secondary education, he trained as an economist and studied Arabic literature.

He mastered the Arabic sciences at the hands of Father Anastase-Marie al-Karmali and Dr. Mustafa Jawad. He studied the history of Iraq at the hands of the lawyer Abbas Al-Azzawi, and studied the Hebrew language at the hands of Isaac Butfis, and prosody at the hands of the poet Mahmoud Al-Mallah. He turned to studying economics and world literature in depth, and he was familiar with ancient and modern Arabic poetry and was influenced by the writers of the diaspora, so he wrote poetry in Hebrew and French and then left them for Arabic.

== Economic research and literature ==
Basri graduated from the University of Baghdad, where he studied economics. He wrote his economic research in the newspapers Al-Ikhwa Al-Watani, Al-Bilad, and Al-Shaab, and edited the weekly newspaper Al-Daleel.

== Political career ==
=== Position in the Iraqi Kingdom ===
In 1928, Basri joined the Iraqi Foreign Ministry, going on to hold a number of government positions including many relating to Iraq's Jewish community. He held many positions in Iraq, including: secretary of the advisory committee and supervisor of supply affairs, director general and secretary at the Iraqi Ministry of Foreign Affairs, undersecretary and director of protocol therein, and president of the Baghdad Chamber of Commerce. He also attended many international conferences representing Iraq. Basri also held the position of honorary president of the Jewish Community in Iraq during the late sixties and early seventies. He headed the Iraqi delegation that the Indian poet Tagore received when he visited Baghdad.

=== Ba'athist Iraq ===
He was chairman of the Jewish Council of Iraq. The Baath government confiscated his house and car, and Basri was then the head of the Jewish community in Iraq, after the death of Rabbi Sasson Khadouri, the acting head of the Mosaic community in Iraq, so Basri became the first religious official for Iraqi Jews abroad. He wrote letters to Ahmed Hassan al-Bakr and Saddam Hussein demanding the rights of the Jewish citizens who began to flee the country one after the other. In early January 1969, Basri, then-Chairman of the Jewish Council of Iraq, was detained for almost two months for interviewing an American who the Iraqi government alleged to be a spy. His detention has been characterised as motivated by antisemitic efforts to censor the Iraqi Jewish community.

After Basri's arrest, the Jewish poet Anwar Shaul, who held the position of legal advisor to the head of the Mosaic community, wrote a poem in which he said:

If I derived my faith from Moses, then I am the one who lives under the shadow of the religion of Muhammad.
The tolerance of Islam was my refuge and the eloquence of the Qur’an was my resource.
What I have gained from my love for the nation of Ahmad, be on the religion of the Prophet, worship him
I will remain that Samual in loyalty, whether I am happy in Baghdad or not
— Anwar Shaul

He sent it to Saleh Mahdi Ammash, who released him, after getting impressed by the poem. A judicial order was issued to release him. He was released to attend the Arab Writers Conference in Baghdad. The Iraqi delegation was headed by Muhammad Mahdi al-Jawahiri and included Anwar Shaul as well. Basri presented an important research that won the admiration of the Arab conference attendees.

== Later year and death ==
In the early 1970s Basri, who had originally been unwilling to immigrate from his home country, left Iraq for Amsterdam. Before Basri left Iraq in 1974, he donated his personal library, which contained about four thousand books, as a gift to the Iraqi National Library and Archive. Basri left Iraq for Amsterdam in 1974. From Amsterdam, he immigrated to the United Kingdom where he lived until his death in 2006 in London.

== Writing ==
During his career, Basri wrote in a variety of genres, including poetry, biography, periodical, and essay and memoir. Much of his writing is centred on his identity as a Jew living in the Arab world during the establishment of Israel; themes of patriotism, homeland, Zionism, and religion are common. Basri described himself as being enthralled with Arabic, particularly Arabic poetry, and published much of his work in the language. In the field of poetry and literature, he published in the Egyptian Al-Kateb magazine, the Beirut Al-Adeeb magazine, and others. He documented the lives of nearly a thousand Iraqi figures in various sciences and arts.

Basri wrote an article about Karbala entitled Karbala, Memories and Glimpses and referred to his epic Processions of the Ages and mentioned a small excerpt from it. Among what was stated in his article: "Karbala was and still is an Islamic cultural centre" then he talked about the events that it went through such as the Wahhabi incident, the Najib Pasha incident, and the Revolution of the Twenties.

He also wrote a review of the seventh century collection of poems in the Husayni Encyclopedia entitled (Painful Human Literature), in which he said: "This Husayni Encyclopedia was interested in Husayni literature in one aspect, which is a sad human literature that immortalizes the tragedy of Karbala, which has been mentioned throughout the ages as a symbol of freedom and redemption. We rarely find in world literature an example of this literature whose voices have risen from pulpits and whose verses have been enshrined in books, and which has remained alive. in the hearts and on the tongues of hundreds of generations, stirring up emotions and making eyes weep."

== See also ==
- Anwar Shaul
