= Ghattas Hazim =

Greek Orthodox hierarch (born 1963)

His Eminence Ghattas
- Metropolitan of Baghdad, Kuwait and Dependencies
- Archdiocese: Antioch
- See: Baghdad
- Elected: 2014
- Term ended: Incumbent
- Predecessor: Constantine (Papastefanou)

Orders
- Ordination: 1990

Personal details
- Born: Ghattas Hazim; 1963 (age 62–63) Mhardeh, Syria
- Denomination: Greek Orthodox
- Education: St. John of Damascus Institute of Theology

Ghattas Hazim (born 1963, in Mhardeh, Syria) is a Greek Orthodox (Eastern Orthodox) hierarch. Since 2014, he serves as Metropolitan of Baghdad, Kuwait and Dependencies, under the jurisdiction of Greek Orthodox Patriarchate of Antioch and All the East.

== Biography ==
Metropolitan Ghattas Hazim was born in 1963, in Mhardeh, Syria. He earned a bachelor's degree in theology from the St. John of Damascus Institute of Theology in 1987. He was ordained a Deacon in the Archdiocese of Hama in 1989, and a priest in 1990. He was elevated to the rank of Archimandrite and appointed Vicar to the Metropolitan of Hama. He served as the Abbot of the Monastery of St. George in Mhardeh. During this time, he oversaw the Christian Education Department in the Archdiocese of Hama. In 1999, he was consecrated by his uncle, the late Patriarch Ignatius IV of Antioch as Bishop of Quarah. He moved to Damascus and was appointed Patriarchal Vicar.

In October 2010, he was appointed dean of the St. John of Damascus Institute of Theology and abbot of the Our Lady of Balamand Patriarchal Monastery in northern Lebanon. In September 2013, he left the post of Dean, while remaining the abbot of the Balamand monastery until his election to Baghdad see

On 7 October 2014, after the retirement of long serving (since 1969) Metropolitan Constantine Papastephanou, the Holy Synod of Antioch elected bishop Ghattas Hazim as new "Metropolitan of Baghdad, Kuwait and Dependencies". Since northern parts of his new diocese (specially Iraq) were severely affected by devastating wars and conflicts during past two decades, upon arriving in Baghdad he was faced with many problems, starting from the fact that over 90% of the Eastern Orthodox Christians in the country have been displaced due to the security chaos which has prevailed there for the past generation. Because of that, his official seat remains in Baghdad, but administrative headquarters of the Archdiocese are still located in Kuwait.

== See also ==
- Eastern Orthodoxy in Iraq
- Christianity in Iraq
- Persecution of Christians in Iraq
- Arab Christians
- Christianity in Kuwait
- Christianity in Oman
- Christianity in Eastern Arabia

Eastern Orthodox Church titles
Preceded by Constantine Papastefanou	Metropolitan of Baghdad; 2014–present	Succeeded by Incumbent
