= Constantine Papastephanou =

Greek Orthodox bishop (1924–2016)

His Eminence Constantine
- Metropolitan of Baghdad, Kuwait and Dependencies
- Archdiocese: Antioch
- See: Baghdad
- Elected: 1969
- Term ended: 2014
- Predecessor: Photius Al-Khoury
- Successor: Ghattas Hazim

Orders
- Ordination: 1951

Personal details
- Born: Ghattas Hazim; 1924 Damascus, Syria
- Died: April 17, 2016 (aged 91–92)
- Denomination: Greek Orthodox
- Education: University of Athens; St. John of Damascus Institute of Theology

Constantine Papastephanou (Greek: Κωνσταντίνος Παπαστεφάνου; born 1924, Damascus, State of Damascus – 17 April 2016, Athens, Greece) was an Eastern Orthodox hierarch and long serving (1969–2014) Metropolitan of Baghdad and Kuwait, under the jurisdiction of the Eastern Orthodox Patriarchate of Antioch and All the East.

== Biography ==
Constantine was born in 1924 in Damascus, the capital of Syria. Entering ecclesiastical service, he studied in Greece and received a Bachelor of Theology degree from the University of Athens. He was ordained priest in 1951 by Patriarch Alexander III of Antioch. At first, he served as a priest in Damascus and its vicinity for eighteen years. During the latter part of the 1950s he was the director of the Balamand Clerical School. In 1964, he was appointed by Patriarch Theodosius VI of Antioch to lead St. Georges Monastery. In 1967, he was given additional duties as general vicar for the Archdiocese of Hama. On October 7, 1969, Constantine was elected Metropolitan Bishop of Baghdad and Kuwait by the Holy Synod of the Eastern Orthodox Patriarchate of Antioch and All the East. On October 17, he was consecrated at the Monastery of St. Elias in Dhor Al Shwair in Lebanon. After installation, he set out to visit and organize his archdiocese. On October 23, 1969, Metropolitan Constantine arrived in Baghdad to conduct his first liturgy at the Cathedral of St. Andrew the Apostle. On November 20, he visited the Kuwait parish, celebrating the liturgy on the next day in temporary facilities in the National Evangelical Church. During the following years he established a number of Eastern Orthodox parishes within the Persian Gulf area, first in 1980 in Dubai and Abu Dhabi. In 1984, he was elected to the Synodal Commission charged with administering the St. John of Damascus Institute of Theology and in 1986 he became the administrator of the Institute itself. In 1998, he established an Eastern Orthodox parish in Oman, followed in 2000 with one in Bahrain. In 2010, Metropolitan Constantine was hospitalized in London. Because of bad health and advanced age, he decided to retire on 17 June 2014, and was succeeded by the new Metropolitan Ghattas Hazim. Metropolitan Constantine died on 17 April 2016.

== See also ==
- Eastern Orthodoxy in Iraq
- Christianity in Iraq
- Persecution of Christians in Iraq
- Arab Christians
- Christianity in Kuwait
- Christianity in Oman
- Christianity in Eastern Arabia

Eastern Orthodox Church titles
Preceded by Photius Al-Khoury	Metropolitan of Baghdad; 1969–2014	Succeeded by Ghattas Hazim
