= Religion in Iraq =

Religion in Iraq (ARDA 2025)
1. Shia Islam (61.2%)
2. Sunni Islam (35.3%)
3. Other Muslims (0.84%)
4. Christianity (0.48%)
5. Other religions (2.13%)

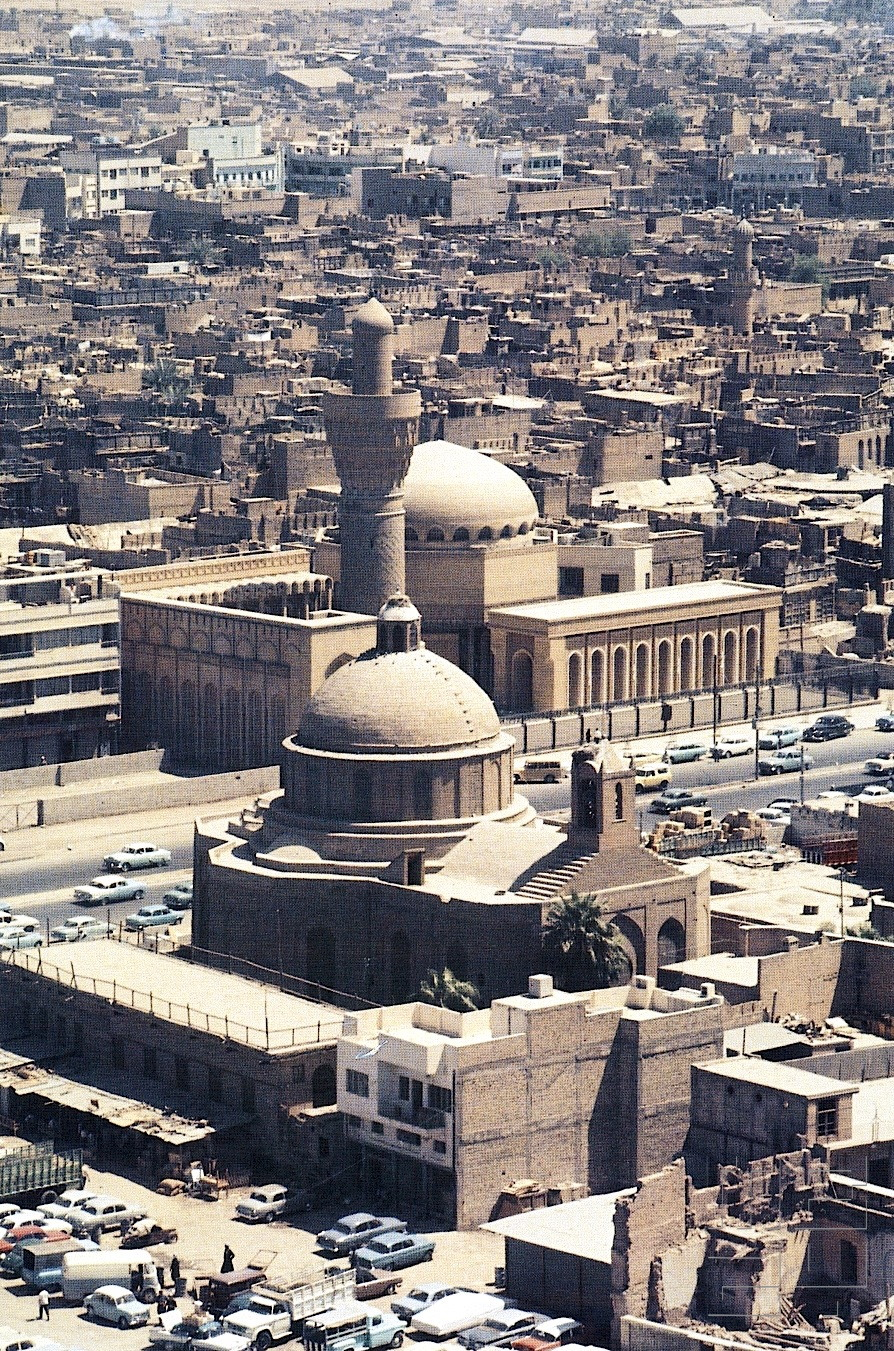
Khulafa Central Mosque, architect Mohamed Makiya, seen with the Coptic Church across the street in Baghdad, completed in 1964.

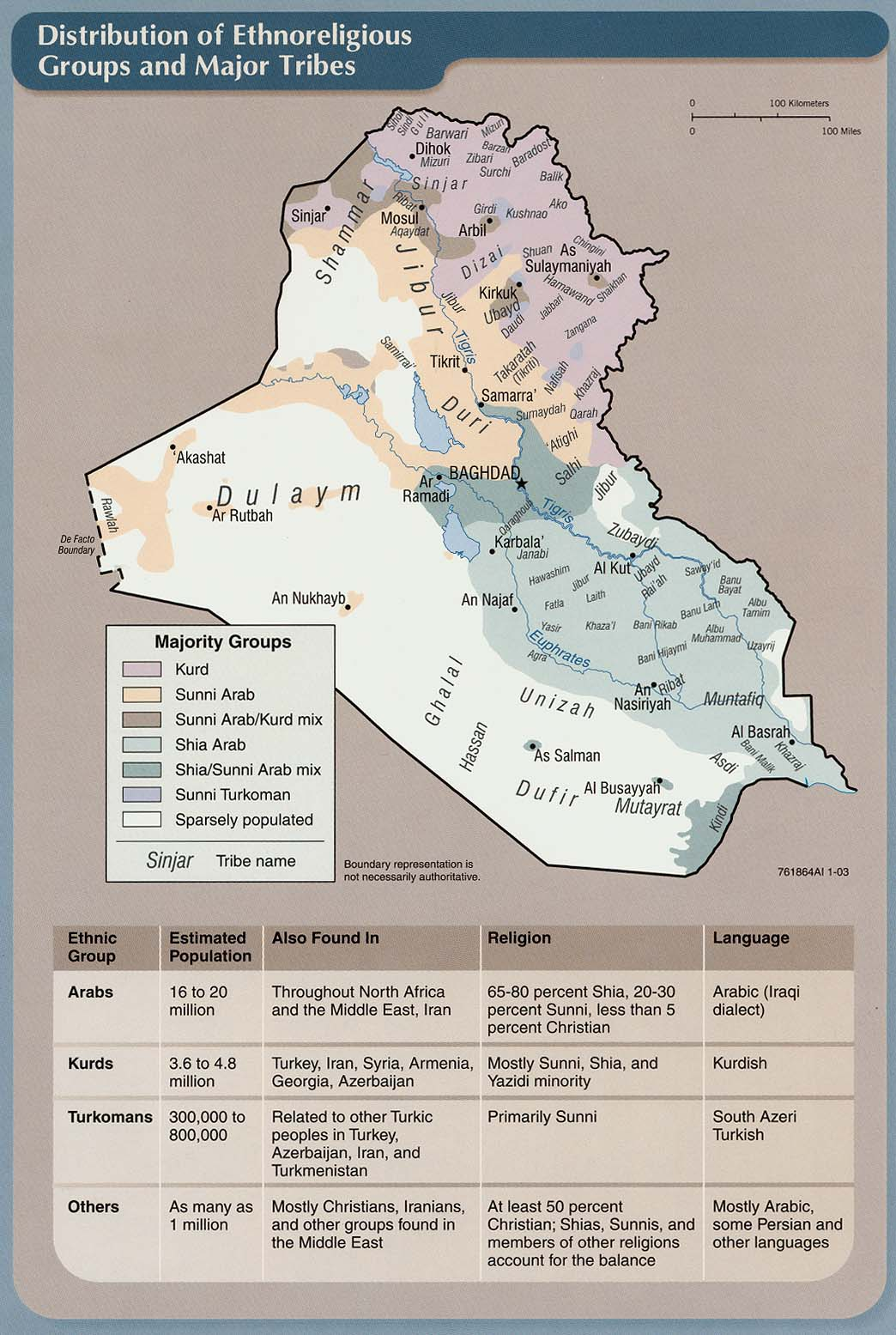
A 2003 CIA Factbook map which shows the distribution of ethnoreligious groups in Iraq.

Religion in Iraq dates back to Ancient Mesopotamia, particularly Sumer, Akkad, Assyria, and Babylonia between c. 3500 BC and 400 AD. Iraqi society consists of a multi-ethnic and multi-religious population, with Islam having been the dominant faith for centuries.

The religious practices of Iraq are shaped by its rich civilizational history, with Ancient Mesopotamian, Persian, Arab and Judeo-Christian influences. Several religions such as Christianity, Mandaeism, Islam, Yazidism, Zoroastrianism and Yarsanism have been practiced in Iraq for centuries.

Iraq's Muslims are split between the Shia and Sunni sects. Approximately 95% to 98% of the population are Muslims, with Shia Muslims constituting around 55% and Sunnis around 40%. Despite being an Arab country within the Arab world, its geopolitical history with Iran has meant that Iraq is majority Shia.

== History ==
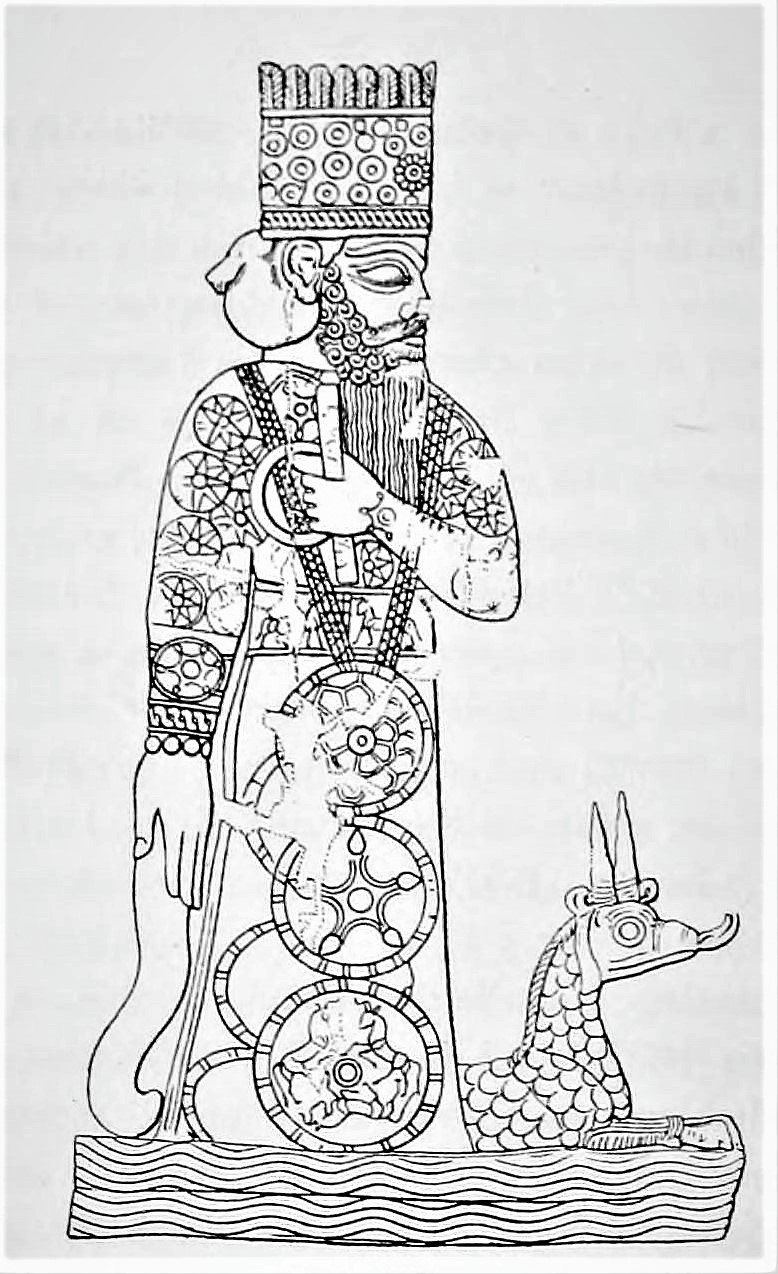
The god Marduk and his dragon Mušḫuššu

The religious development of Mesopotamia and Mesopotamian culture in general, especially in the south, was not particularly influenced by the movements of the various peoples into and throughout the area. Rather, Mesopotamian religion was a consistent and coherent tradition which adapted to the internal needs of its adherents over millennia of development.

There was increasing syncretism between the Sumerian and Akkadian cultures and deities, with the Akkadians typically preferring to worship fewer deities but elevating them to greater positions of power. Circa 2335 BC, Sargon of Akkad conquered all of Mesopotamia, uniting its inhabitants into the world's first empire and spreading its domination into ancient Iran, the Levant, Anatolia, Canaan and the Arabian Peninsula. The Akkadian Empire endured for two centuries before collapsing due to economic decline, internal strife and attacks from the north east by the Gutian people.

=== Modern era ===
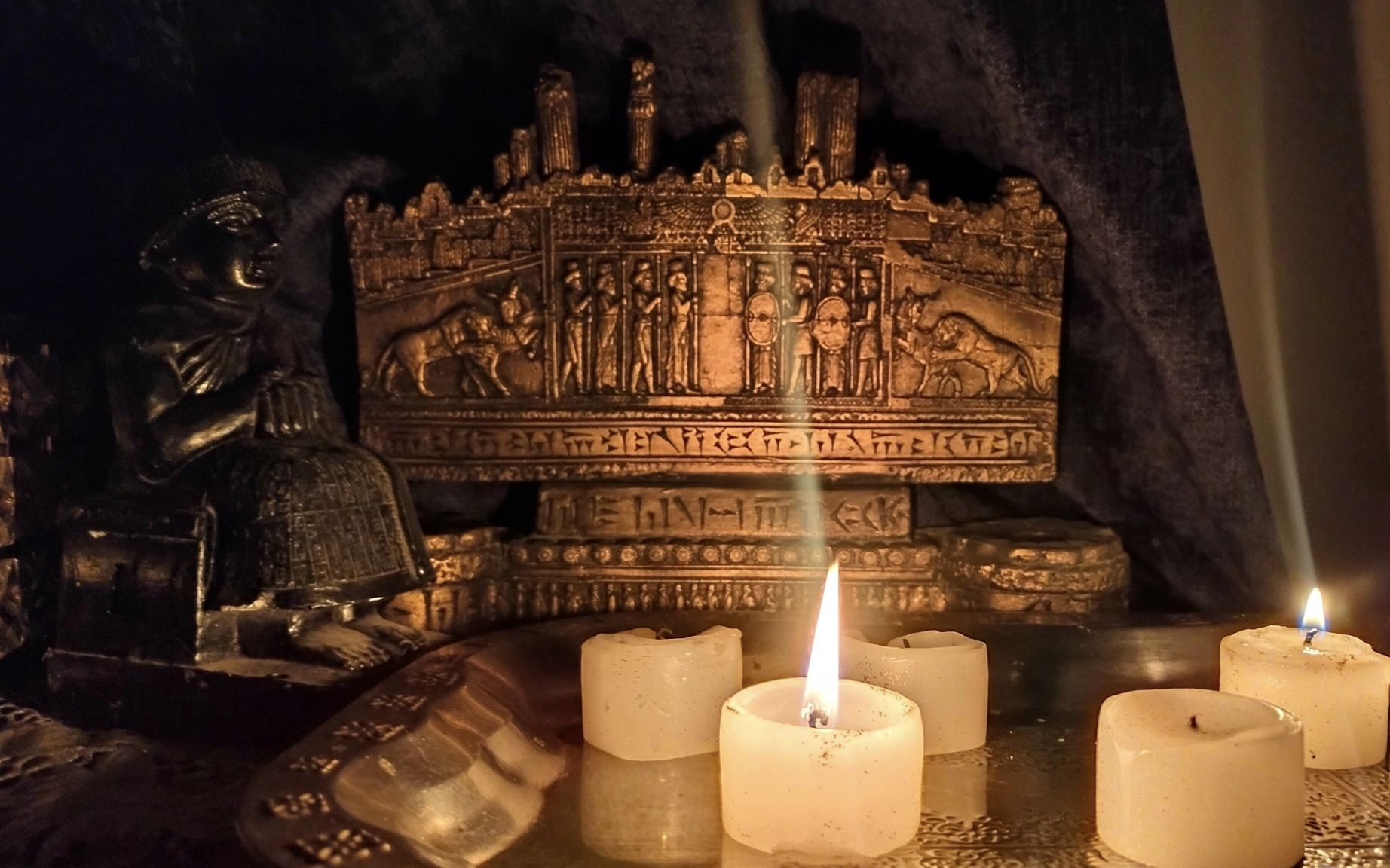
Altar dedicated to Gudea and other divine figures, by a practitioner of Zuism (Mesopotamian Neopaganism) from Nasiriyah.

The "Global Index of Religiosity and Atheism" listed Iraq as one of six countries as having the lowest rate of atheism in 2012. After six years, with religious figures coming to power, the situation changed fast as the tide of religiosity receded. According to Iraqi thinker Izzat Shahbandar, this came after their ruling political class came to power, and their role in sectarianism and state corruption, and by regularly occupying television slots to spread their agendas. The increasing prevalence of atheism and agnosticism signals a tidal public opinion change.

Iraq has Islam as the official religion of the state, according to Article 2 of the Constitution, Article 14 of which states that all Iraqis are equal before the law without discrimination. Article 43 of the Constitution gave freedom to followers of every sect to practice their religious rituals, and emphasized the Husseini rituals, and that the state guarantees freedom of worship and the protection of its places. The population, according to the latest census prepared by the Central Agency for Public Mobilization and Statistics for the year 2017, is 37 million, 139 thousand, and 519 people, with a growth rate of 2.61%, with a male-to-female ratio at birth of 103.9%.

In 2005, the population was 27,962,968, according to the Central Bureau of Statistics. The population, according to the Ministry of Planning and Development Cooperation for 2015, reached 36 million people, an increase of 5 million from 2009, when the number reached 31.6 million people. Iraq conducted its first nationwide population census in decades in 2024. Final results announced in November 2025 recorded a population of 46,118,793. The census did not distinguish between Sunni and Shia Muslims and did not collect ethnicity data, limiting its usefulness for estimating the populations of some ethnoreligious minorities.

== Islam ==
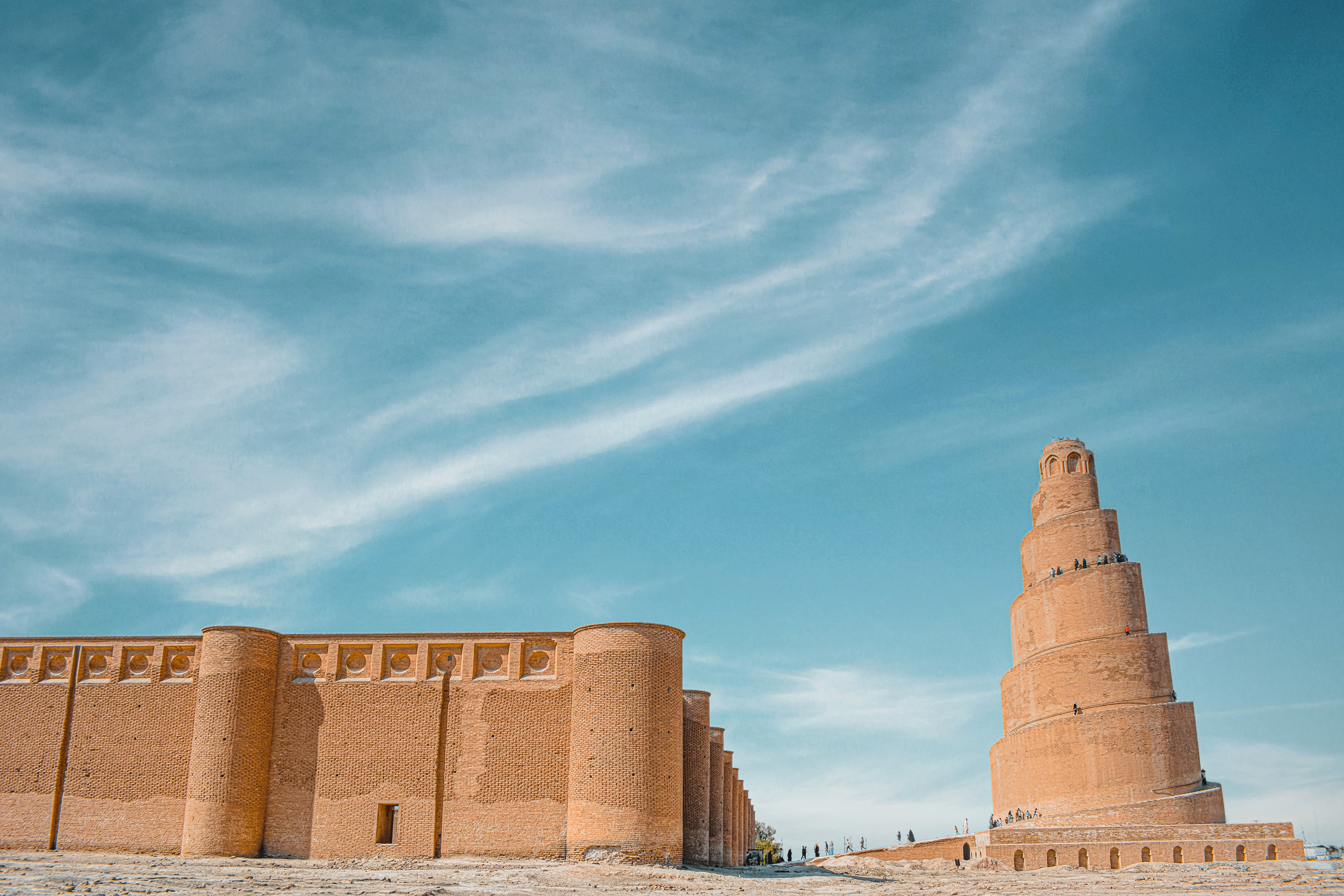
Great Mosque of Samarra with its iconic minaret completed in the 9th century CE (851)

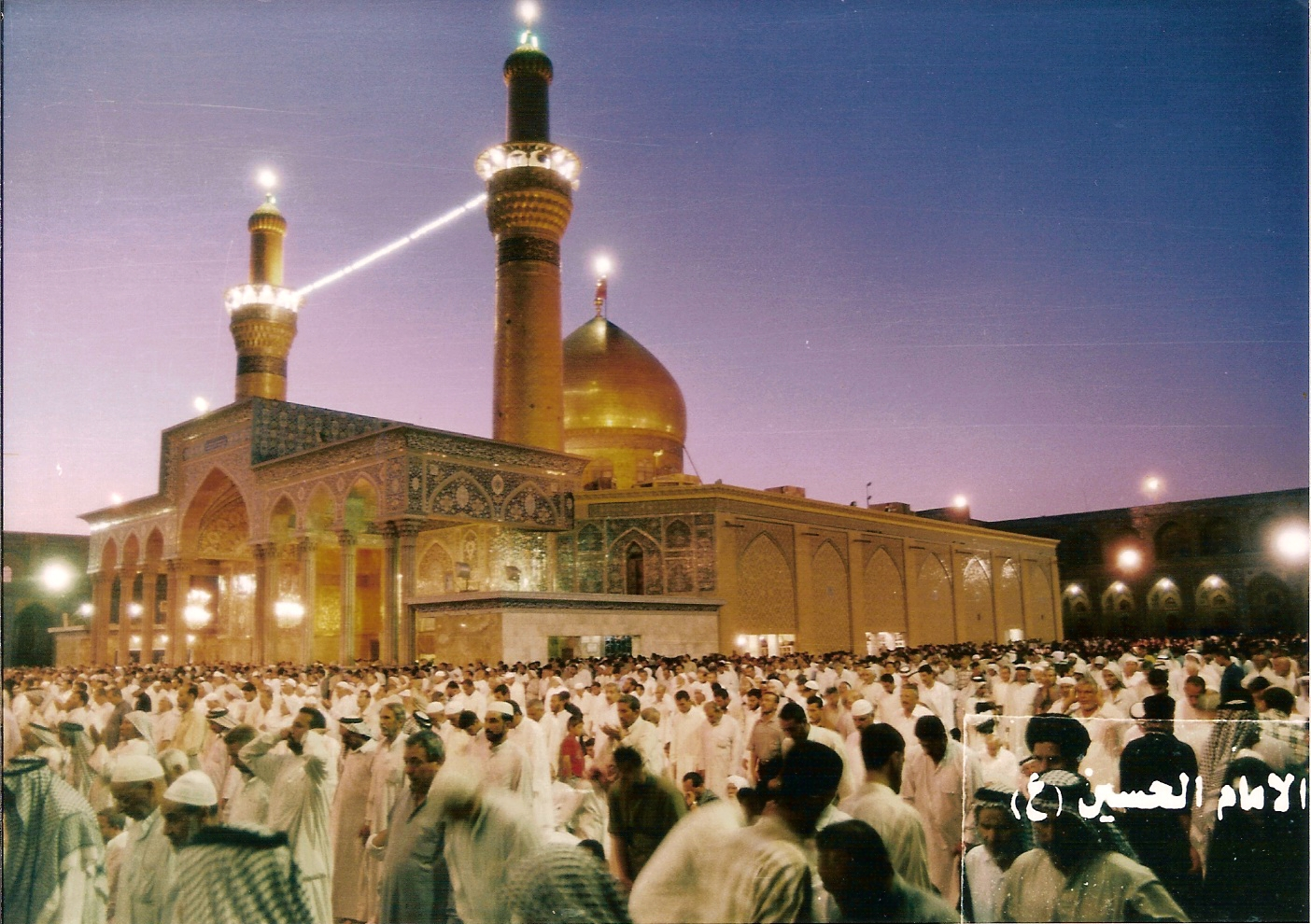
Imam Husayn Shrine in Karbala

Iraq's Muslims follow two distinct traditions, Shia and Sunni Islam. According to the CIA World Factbook, Iraq is approximately 95% to 98% Muslim, with approximately 55% Shia and 40% Sunni. According to a 2011 survey by Pew Research, 51% of the Muslims identify as Shia and 42% as Sunni. Iraq is home to many religious sites important for both Shia and Sunni.

Baghdad was a hub of Islamic learning and scholarship for centuries and served as the capital of the Abbasids. The city of Karbala has substantial prominence in Shia Islam as a result of the Battle of Karbala, which was fought on the site of the modern city on 10 October 680. Similarly, Najaf is renowned as the site of the tomb of Alī ibn Abī Tālib (also known as "Imām Alī"). The Shia consider him to be the righteous caliph and first imām. The city is now a great center of pilgrimage from throughout the Shia Islamic world even though his grave is debatable and it is estimated that only Mecca and Medina receive more Muslim pilgrims.

The city of Kufa was home to the famed Sunni scholar Abu Hanifah, whose school of thought is followed by a sizable number of Sunnis across the globe. Likewise, Samarra is home to the al-Askari Mosque, containing the mausoleums of the Ali al-Hadi and Hasan al-Askari, the tenth and eleventh Shia Imams, respectively, as well as the shrine of Muhammad al-Mahdi, known as the "Hidden Imam", who is the twelfth and final Imam of the Shia of the Ja'farī Madhhab. This has made it an important pilgrimage centre for Ja'farī Shia. In addition, some female relatives of the Islamic prophet Muhammad are buried in Samarra, making the city one of the most significant sites of worship for Shia and a venerated location for Sunnis.

Smaller sects of Islam exist in the country, such as the small Shia Shaykhist community concentrated in Basra and Karbala.

=== Arabs ===
Iraqi Arabs are a mix between Shia and Sunni. The Arab Sunni live mainly in the area of the so-called Sunni Triangle, but there are other communities in other parts of the country, whereas the Arab Shia live mainly in Southeast Iraq. The capital Baghdad is mixed of Arab Sunni and Arab Shia as well as other religions.

=== Kurds ===
Iraqi Kurds are around 70% Sunni, with a Shia Feyli minority of 30%. Most Kurds are located in the northern areas of the country. Most Iraqi Kurdish Muslims follow the Shafi school of Islamic law, while others are members of either the Qadiri or the Naqshbandi Sufi tariqah.

=== Turkmen ===
About 75% of Iraqi Turkmen are Sunni, and about 25% practice Shia Islam. Collectively, most Iraqi Turkmen are secular, having internalized the secularist interpretation of state–religion affairs practiced in the Republic of Turkey. The religious and tribal factors and tensions inherent in Iraq's political culture do not significantly affect the Iraqi Turkmen Sunnis and Shias.

== Christianity ==
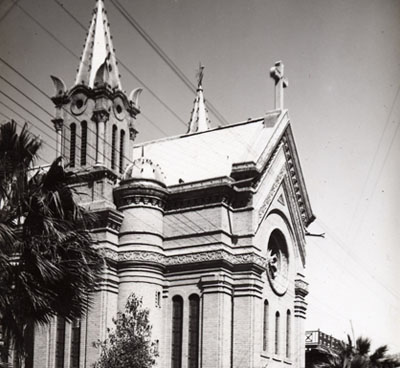
Baghdad Latin Church

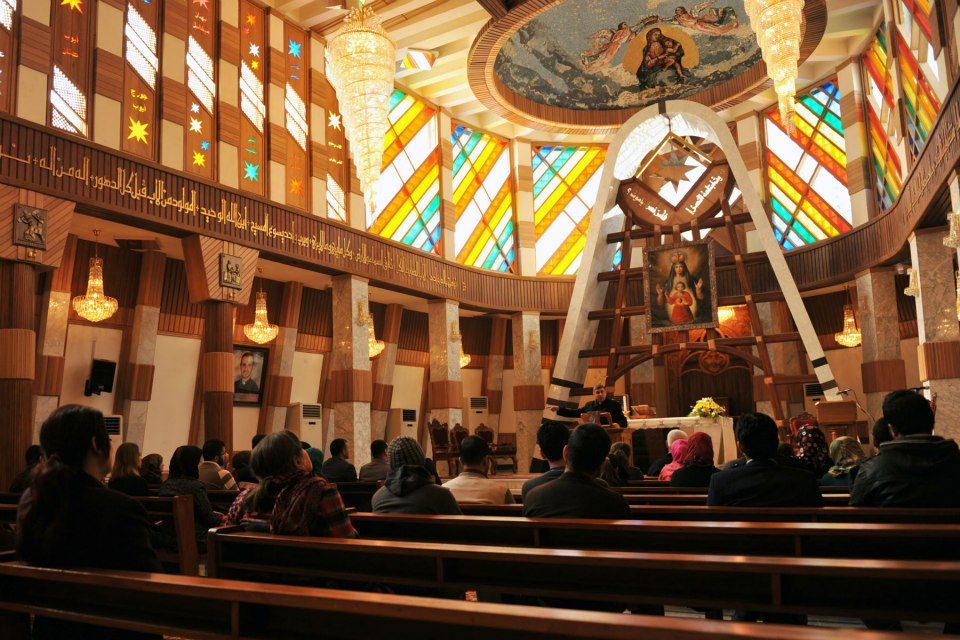
Syriac Catholic Church in Baghdad

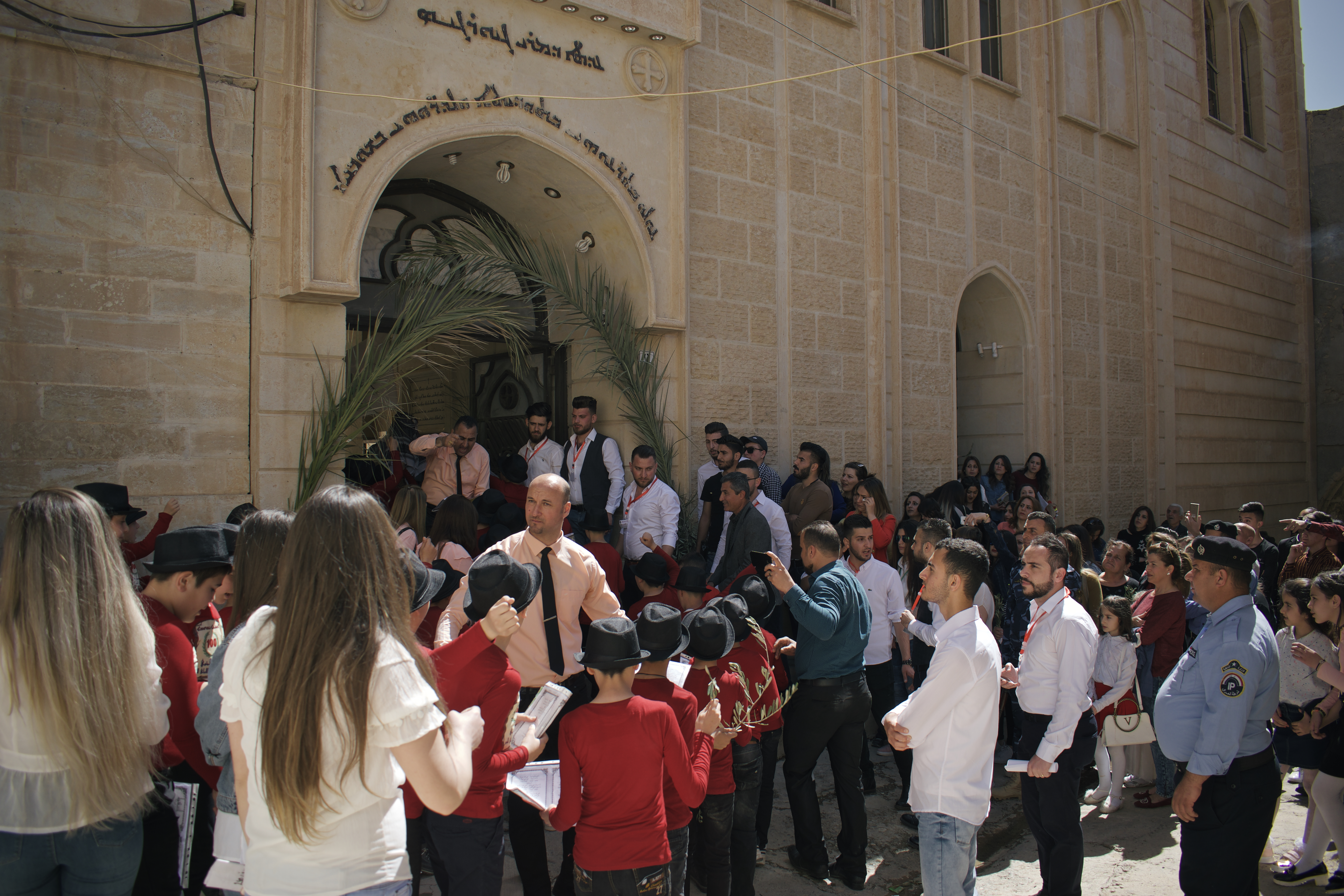
Chaldean Catholics in Al Qosh, 2018

Christianity was brought to Iraq in 40's AD/CE by Thomas the Apostle, Thaddaeus of Edessa and his pupils Aggagi and Mari. Thomas and Thaddeus belonged to the twelve Apostles. Iraq's indigenous Assyrian people represent roughly 3% of the population (earlier CIA Factbook), mostly living in Northern Iraq, concentrated in the Ninewa and Dahuk governorates.

Iraq's Christian population declined substantially during the late 20th and early 21st centuries, particularly following the 2003 Iraq War and subsequent violence and displacement. According to Christian leaders and other sources cited by the U.S. Department of State in 2023, fewer than 150,000 Christians remained in Iraq, compared with an estimated 1.5 million before 2003. Approximately 67% were Chaldean Catholics and nearly 20% belonged to the Assyrian Church of the East; Armenian community leaders estimated approximately 12,000 Armenian Christians remained in the country.

Assyrians in Iraq are divided into five church bodies:

- Chaldean Catholic Church
- Assyrian Church of the East (and Ancient Church of the East)
- Syriac Orthodox Church
- "Eastern Orthodox" group (Archdiocese of Baghdad, under jurisdiction of the Eastern Orthodox Patriarchate of Antioch and All the East)
- "Eastern Evangelical" for the alliance Protestant.

Assyrians constitute 0.5% of the population of Iraq. They are a Semitic people who settled in the northern part of Iraq since the third millennium BC. Assyrians speak the modern Assyrian language, also known as Syriac in church literature, due to its spread by the Church of the East, which was known as Syriac.

== Yazidism ==
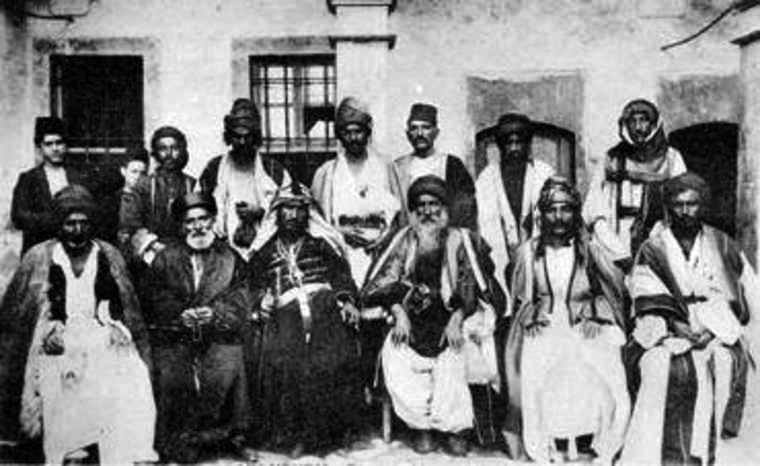
Yazidi leaders meet the Chaldean patriarch Audishu V Khayyath in Mosul, c.1895

The Yazidis are an ethnoreligious minority concentrated primarily in Nineveh Governorate and the Kurdistan Region of Iraq. Yazidi community leaders estimated the Iraqi population at approximately 400,000 to 500,000 in 2023. The community continues to experience the effects of the Yazidi genocide perpetrated by the Islamic State beginning in 2014. Large numbers of Yazidis have remained internally displaced, and reconstruction and return to Sinjar have proceeded slowly.

== Zoroastrianism ==
Zoroastrianism was one of the dominant religions in Northern Mesopotamia before the Islamic era. Currently, Zoroastrianism is an officially recognized religion in Iraqi Kurdistan and Iran.

Zoroastrianism has become the fastest growing religion with Kurds, especially in Kurdish-controlled Northern Iraq. Because of the religion's strong ties to Kurdish culture, there has been a recent rebirth of Zoroastrianism in the region, and as of August 2015 the Kurdistan Regional Government (KRG) officially recognized Zoroastrianism as a religion within Kurdish Iraq. Arguably the world's oldest monotheistic religion, Zoroastrianism (Zardashti in Kurdish) has almost disappeared in the last century until recent years. According to Yasna, an association that promotes Zoroastrianism in Kurdistan, since 2014 about 15,000 people have registered with the organization, most of them Kurds converting from Islam. People in Iraqi Kurdistan have converted to Zoroastrianism from a Muslim background since 2015, with the first new Zoroastrian temples being built and opened in 2016.

Many Kurdish people converted from Islam to Zoroastrianism, especially after ISIL attacked Iraqi Kurdistan. The surge in Kurdish Muslims converting to Zoroastrianism, the faith of their ancestors is largely attributed to disillusionment with Islam after the years of violence and barbarism perpetrated by the ISIS terrorist group. A Kurdish Islamic cleric claimed that Zoroastrianism was forced on Kurds by "fire-worshipping Persians", where as Islam liberated them, and he called on Kurdish Muslims to kill Zoroastrian converts if they do not convert back to Islam in 3 days.

On 21 September 2016, the first official Zoroastrian fire temple of Iraqi Kurdistan opened in Sulaymaniyah. Attendees celebrated the occasion by lighting a ritual fire and beating the frame drum or daf. There are no accurate numbers on the population of Zoroastrians in Iraq because they are listed as "Muslims" on their government-issued documents. According to the KRG MERA, there are approximately 80,000 to 100,000 Zoroastrians in the Iraqi Kurdistan Region.

== Mandaeism ==
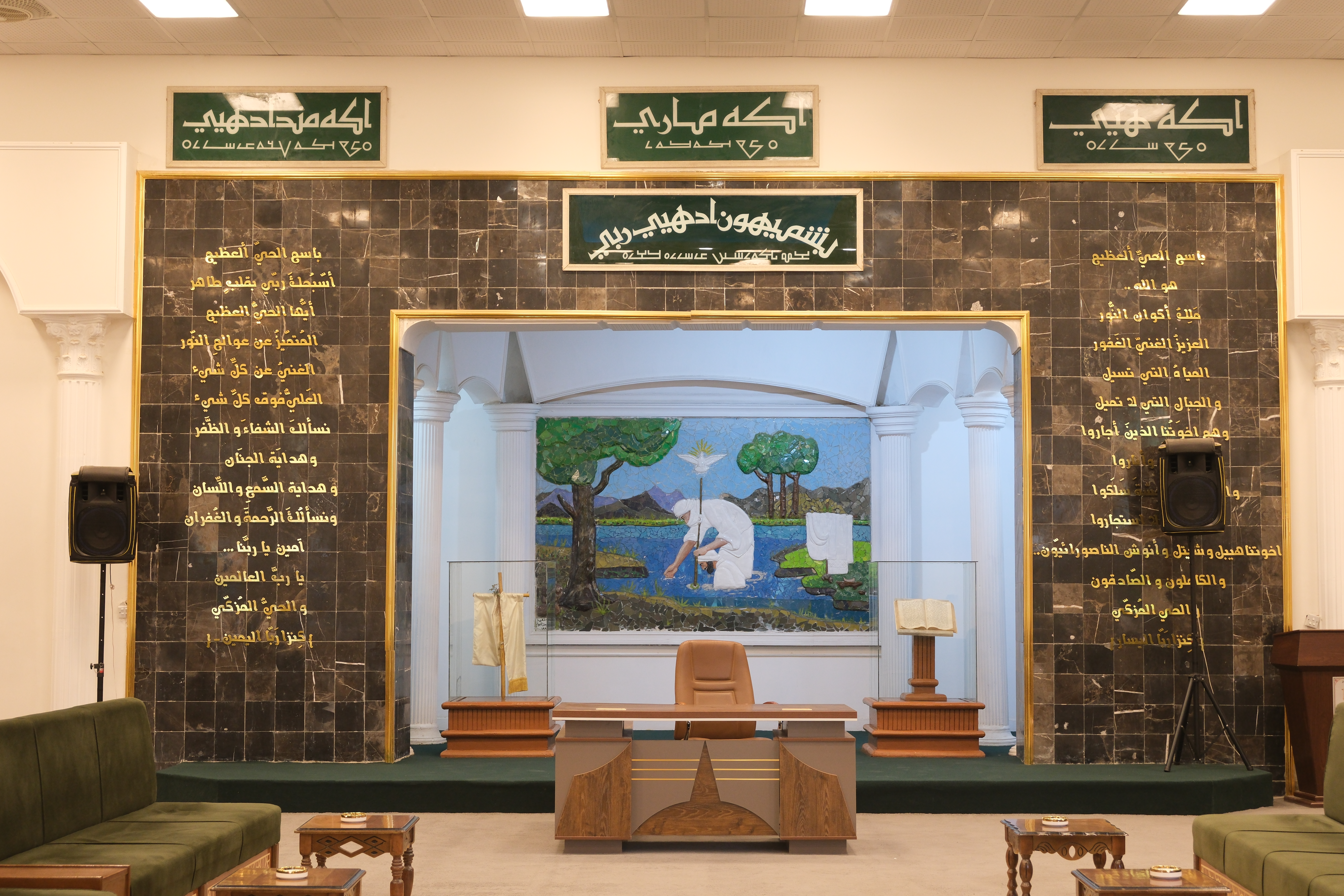
Inside the Sabian–Mandaean Mandi of Baghdad

The Mandaeans are an ethnoreligious community historically concentrated in southern Iraq, particularly in areas along the Tigris and Euphrates river systems. Flowing water has particular religious importance because Mandaean baptismal rituals are traditionally performed in rivers. Estimates of the community's current size vary; according to Mandaean community leaders cited by the U.S. Department of State in 2023, approximately 10,000 to 15,000 Mandaeans remained in Iraq, mainly in the south, with between 450 and 1,000 living in Baghdad and the Kurdistan Region.

Mandaeism is a religion whose followers believe that it is one of the oldest known religions in human history, and that their first prophet and teacher was Adam, then his son Seth, Sam bin Noah, and John bin Zachariah (John the Baptist), peace be upon them. The Mandaeans say that they follow John.

According to the Haran Gawaita, a text that tells the history of the Mandaean people, the Mandaeans arrived in the Parthian Empire during the reign of Artabanus II, and later moved to southern Babylonia. This would make the Iraqi presence of Mandaeans approximately 2000 years old, making it the third oldest continually-practiced faith in Iraqi society after Zoroastrianism and Judaism. However, Mandaeans believe their religion predates Judaism and Christianity as a monotheistic faith tracing it back to their first prophet Adam. The oldest independent confirmation of Mandaean existence in the region is Kartir's inscription at Ka'ba-ye Zartosht. The Mandaean faith is commonly known as the last surviving Gnostic religion. John the Baptist, known as Yahia Yuhanna, is considered to have been the final Mandaean prophet and first true Ris'Amma, or Ethnarch, of the Mandaean people.

Saddam was recognized for safeguarding the Mandaean minority in Iraq. Mandaeans were given state protection under his government. As a sign of respect, the Mandaean Book of John's first copy translation into Arabic was given to Saddam. After this he vowed to construct temples for the Mandaeans, with quoting, "Iraqis have religious freedom, whether they are Muslims, Christians or Sabaeans". The Sabian–Mandaean Mandi in Baghdad was built on land donated by the Ministry of Finance. Mandaeans were some of the best goldsmiths and jewelers in Iraq, with Saddam's personal jeweler being of Mandaean background. A large number of Mandeans also worked in numerous positions, such as poet Abdul Razzaq, the cultural advisor to the Ministry of Culture and Information and Lamia Abbas, who was a cultural attaché and deputy permanent representative of Iraq to UNESCO in Paris for the period 1973-1975. However, after his downfall, Mandaeans faced severe persecution, and constant kidnappings. They often expressed that they were better under Saddam's rule, and praise him for the protection they received.

Until the 2003 Iraq war, there were about 75,000 estimated Mandaeans living in Iraq. Most Iraqi Mandaeans live near waterways because of the practice of total immersion (or baptism) in flowing water every Sunday. The highest concentrations are in Amarah, Nasiriyah and Basra. Besides these southern regions and Ahvaz in Iran, large numbers of Mandaeans can be found in Baghdad, giving them easy access to the Tigris River. In 2001, Saddam Hussein awarded the Mandaean community as a Golden Sect. Under his rule, Mandaeans flourished in Iraq.

== Judaism ==
The Jewish presence in Iraq dates back to the days of the Babylonian and Assyrian captivities, during which they experienced significant displacement. Judaism first came to Iraq under the rule of the Babylonian king Nebuchadnezzar II of Babylon. In the 19th century, Baghdad became a leading center for Jewish learning. Jewish communities were also present in Basra and northern Iraq, where they played an important role in shaping the country's development. Notable Jewish figures in Iraq include Sassoon Eskell, Menahem Saleh Daniel, Salima Pasha, Mir Basri, Anwar Shaul, Naim Dangoor, and Ibrahim Hesqel. By 1948, their population numbered around 150,000 to 450,000, constituting approximately 3% of Iraq's total population.

Following the establishment of Israel in 1948, Iraqi Jews faced persecution, as was the case in much of the Muslim world while also being attracted en masse to the newly formed Jewish state. During Operation Ezra and Nehemiah, more than 100,000 Jews were airlifted to Israel, although many chose to stay in the country. Iraqi-born Israeli-British historian Avi Shlaim later argued that the sudden mass migration was driven by a mix of fear, political pressure, and covert Zionist activity, including bombings in Baghdad that hastened the exodus. Abdul-Karim Qasim treated them relatively well. However, after the Six-Day War in 1967, riots prompted the majority of Jews to flee. When Saddam Hussein came to power, around 20,000 Jews still remained. He lifted restrictions on travel, which led to further emigration and a decline in the Jewish population. Nevertheless, Saddam ensured that the remaining Jews would not be harmed. During Saddam's reign, Jews were not subjected to exclusion but they did get sidelined by Iraq's national ideology.

In 2003, the Jewish Agency estimated that 35 Jews were living in Iraq. However, it is likely that there were hundreds more who remained hidden out of fear. Among the American forces stationed in Iraq in 2008, there were three Jewish chaplains. Estimates of the Jewish population in Iraq vary. A small number of Jews, estimated to be around 500, still live in Iraq, primarily in the Kurdistan Region and Baghdad. Since the fall of Ba'athism, Jews in Iraq have faced increased socio-cultural pressure as well as persecution.

== Hinduism ==
There were 3,801 (0.01%) Hindus in 2010 according to ARDA. By 2020, there were an estimated 2800 Hindus in Iraq. All of these Hindus come from the Indian subcontinent, particularly India and Bangladesh.

== Sikhism ==
It is estimated that in 2020, there were 5,600 Sikhs in the country.

It is believed that Guru Nanak Dev (founder of Sikhism) came to Baghdad in 1511 AD. In March 2023, India formally requested Iraq renovate a historic Sikh temple, Baba Nanak Shrine, which is located in Baghdad. It was built in honor of Guru Nanak's travels through the Muslim world. It had been repaired by Sikh conscripts during WW2. The request was made during a visit by Iraqi National Security Adviser, Qasem Al-Araji, to Delhi where he met his Indian counterpart Ajit Doval.

== Baháʼí Faith ==
The Baháʼí Faith has a significant historical connection to Iraq. Baháʼu'lláh, the founder of the religion, was exiled from Iran to Baghdad in 1853 and lived there for ten years. In 1863, shortly before his departure from Ottoman Iraq, he declared his religious mission in the Garden of Ridván on the banks of the Tigris.

The Iraqi Baháʼí community became increasingly institutionalized during the 20th century. The Iraqi government permitted the establishment of the Iraqi Baháʼí National Spiritual Assembly in 1931, recognized the legality of Baháʼí marriages in 1947, and included Baháʼís as a religious category in the 1957 census. In 1970, the Ba'athist government prohibited Baháʼí activity, expropriated Baháʼí property, imprisoned adherents, and prohibited Baháʼí religious literature.

Federal Iraqi law continues to prohibit the practice of the Baháʼí Faith, although the prohibition is generally not enforced, while the Kurdistan Regional Government recognizes the religion. Baháʼí leaders estimated in 2023 that fewer than 2,000 adherents lived in Iraq, including approximately 100 families in the Kurdistan Region.

== Freedom of religion ==
The constitution states that Islam is the official religion of the country. Islam plays a dominant role in shaping Iraqi culture and society.

In 2023, Iraq scored 1 out of 4 for religious freedom, indicating the supposed lack of religious freedom in Iraq enforced by the state.

== See also ==
- Freedom of religion in Iraq
- Christianity in Iraq
- Ancient Mesopotamian religion
- Culture of Iraq
- Demographics of Iraq
