= Emmanuel Gharib =

Kuwaiti pastor

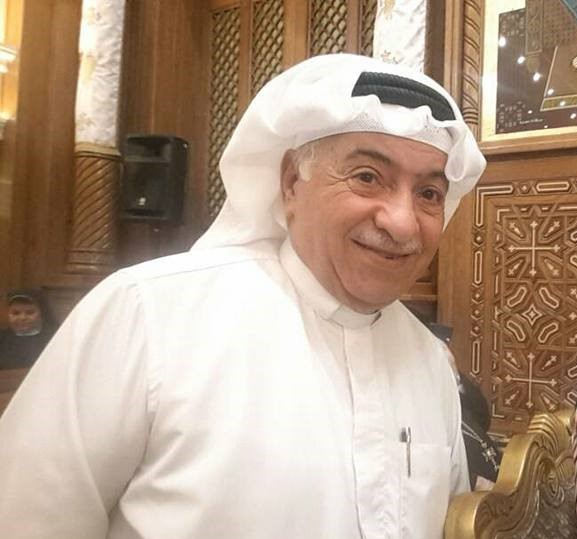
Emmanuel Gharib

Emmanuel Benjamin Gharib is a Kuwaiti pastor of the Kuwait Presbyterian Church and the chairman of the National Evangelical Church of Kuwait, a campus where nearly 100 Christian denominations gather for prayer.

== Biography ==
He was born in the Qibla district of Kuwait City. His father's family is of Assyrians originally from Southeast Turkey. His father, Benyamin Gharib, moved to Iraq to flee the massacres against the Assyrians, where he married a Christian Assyrian woman. The couple moved to Kuwait. Emmanuel is the oldest of seven siblings.

He graduated with a degree in geology in 1971 and was hired at the Ministry of Oil. Ten years later, he discovered his Christian faith. In 1989, he started to study theology in Cairo. In 1999, he was ordained a pastor, and later named head of the Evangelical Church in Kuwait, becoming the first Gulf Arab pastor.

== Other roles ==
- Since 2009: Co-founder and vice-president of the Islamic-Christian Relations Council in Kuwait
