= Anwar Shaul =

Iraqi-Israeli journalist and author (1904–1984)

- אנואר שאול أنور شاؤول
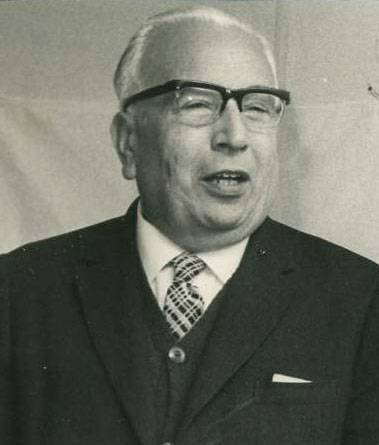
- Born: 1904; Hillah, Ottoman Empire (now Iraq)
- Died: 1984 (aged 79–80); Israel
- Occupations: Journalist; author; poet
- Years active: 1924–1984

Anwar Shaul (Hebrew: אנואר שאול; Arabic: أنور شاؤول; 1904–1984) was an Iraqi-born Israeli journalist, publisher, author, translator, and poet.

== Early life and education ==
Shaul was born in Hillah in Ottoman Iraq to a family of Iraqi Jews. He was of Mizrahi descent on his father's side (Iraqi-Jewish) and of second-generation Ashkenazi descent on his mother's side (Austrian-Jewish). He originally trained as a lawyer at the Baghdad Law College, graduating in 1931.

== Career ==
Shaul served as editor of the Iraqi Zionist journal Al-Miṣbāḥ (אל-מצבאח; المصباح) from 1924 to 1925. In his contributions to the publication, he wrote under the pseudonym "Ibn al-Samaw'al" in an allusion to the 6th-century Arabian-Jewish poet Samaw'al ibn 'Adiya.

From 1929 to 1938, Shaul founded and worked as an editor for Al-Hassid (الحاصد lit. 'The Reaper'), a weekly literary magazine. It featured significant political commentary, mixing harsh criticism of European fascism and advocacy for both Iraqi nationalism and complete political independence from the British Empire. Under his editorial leadership, Al-Hassid became the foremost weekly magazine in Baghdad.

In addition to his publication of periodicals, Shaul published a number of longer works, including memoirs, translations of Western literature into Arabic, as well as anthologies of short stories and Arabic poetry. In 1948, he also wrote the screenplay for Iraq's first feature film Alia and Essam.

=== Immigration to Israel ===
In 1971, Shaul, who had long been resistant to emigrating despite intensive state-sponsored antisemitism in Iraq, reluctantly made aliyah. He continued to live in Israel, where he published his works in Arabic, until his death in 1984.
