= Islam in Iraq =

Islam in Iraq has a rich and complicated history dating back almost 1,400 years, since the lifetime of the Islamic prophet Muhammad (c. 570 – 8 June 632 CE). As one of the first places in the world to accept Islam, Iraq is a mostly Muslim nation, with about 98% of the people identifying as Muslim. There are the two main branches of Islam in Iraq: Shia Islam, which is practiced by a slight majority of Muslims and Sunni Islam, which is practiced by nearly half of Muslims.

Iraq holds a prominent place in Islamic history and has been a hub of Islamic thought and government. Baghdad was once the capital of the Abbasid Caliphate and a center of Islamic scholarship. The famous Sunni thinker Abu Hanifa taught in Kufa, and Ibn Hanbal taught in Baghdad. The tomb of Ali ibn Abi Talib, the first Shia Imam and the fourth caliph, is in Najaf, a major pilgrimage site. Karbala was the site of the Battle of Karbala in 680 AD, which had a significant impact on Shia beliefs and practices. The Kadhimiya neighborhood in Baghdad contains the shrines of the seventh and ninth Shia Imams Musa al-Kazim and Muhammad al-Jawad, while the Al-Askari Shrine in Samarra is the site of the tombs of the tenth and eleventh Shia Imams Ali al-Hadi and Hasan al-Askari.

Throughout history, Iraq has also been the site of many fitnas, or religious splits, that have changed the way sects interact with each other. This makes it an important place to study Islamic history and the relationships between different sects.

== History ==
=== The Fall of the Sasanian Empire ===
Islam was introduced to Iraq in 636 AD, after the defeat of Sasanian forces by the Rashidun Caliphate at the Battle of al-Qadisiyyah. Following the murder of the Caliph Uthman, the Sunni and Shi'ite tradition of Islam emerged in Iraq. In 661, after the death of Ali—Muhammad's cousin and considered by the Shi'ite to be the rightful Caliph—by the hands of a Kharijite, Iraq fell into the hands of the Umayyad Caliphate. Under the Umayyad Caliphate, Islam spread farther throughout the known world.

=== The Abbasid Caliphate ===
The reign of the Umayyad Caliphate came to an end in 750, when they were overthrown by a religion-inspired military revolt, bringing the Abbasid Caliphate into power. The Abbasid Caliphate was a Sunni dynasty, and under their stewardship, the Sunni tradition of Islam flourished in Iraq. Furthermore, in 762, the Abbasid Caliphate moved the center of the Islamic world from Syria, where the Umayyad Caliphate ruled, to Baghdad in Iraq. Islamic religious scholars (Ulama), flourished under the Abbasid Caliphate. With the establishment of the House of Wisdom in Baghdad, Ulama codified many Islamic texts, and the Sunni tradition of Islam established itself and its formal practices. Under the Abbasid Caliphate the Sunni schools of thought (madhhabs) emerged.

== Religious cities ==
Iraq is home to many religious cities important for both Shia and Sunni Muslims. Baghdad was a hub of Islamic learning and scholarship for centuries and served as the capital of the Abbasids. Baghdad also is home to two prominent Shia Imams in what is known as Kadhimiya, Iraq. The city of Karbala has substantial prominence in Shia Islam as a result of the Battle of Karbala, fought on 10 October 680. Similarly, Najaf is renowned as the site of the tomb of Alī ibn Abī Tālib (also known as "Imām Alī" by Majority of Shias and "Hazrat Alī" by Majority of Sunnis), whom the Shia consider to be the righteous caliph and first imām. The city is now a great center of pilgrimage from throughout the Shi'a world and it is estimated that only Mecca and Medina receive more Muslim pilgrims. The city of Kufa was home to the famed scholar Imam Abu Hanifah ("1 of the Imam of Sunni's others notably are Imam Sha'fi, Imam Malik & Imam Ahmed ibn Hanbal), whose school of thought is followed by many Sunni Muslims internationally. Kufa was also the capital of the Rashidun Caliphate during the time of Hazrat Ali. Likewise, Samarra is also home to the al-Askari Mosque, containing the mausoleums of the Ali al-Hadi and Hasan al-Askari, the tenth and eleventh Shia Imams respectively, as well as the maqam (or "point") of Muhammad al-Mahdi, who is the twelfth and final Imam of the Shia Madhhab. This has made it an important pilgrimage centre for Ja'farī Shia Muslims. In addition, some female relatives of Muhammad are buried in Samarra, making the city one of the most significant sites of worship for Shia Muslims and a venerated location for Sunni Muslims. Iraq was also the place of many the fitnas (schisms) that occurred in the beginning.

== Religious institutions and education ==
Iraq is home to some of the oldest and most influential institutions of Islamic learning. Among these, the Shia seminary (''hawza'') in Najaf is regarded as one of the leading centers of Twelver Shia scholarship worldwide. The seminary traces its origins to the eleventh century and has educated numerous prominent clerics from Iraq, Iran, Lebanon, Pakistan, India, and other countries. Following the fall of Saddam Hussein's government in 2003, the Najaf hawza experienced significant growth, with the number of students increasing substantially as restrictions on religious education were lifted.

The Najaf seminary is headed by senior ''maraji'' (sources of emulation), among whom Grand Ayatollah Ali al-Sistani has remained one of the most influential Shia religious authorities. Unlike the Iranian model of ''Wilayat al-Faqih'', the Najaf school has traditionally emphasized political quietism, arguing that senior clerics should generally remain above direct partisan politics while providing moral and religious guidance on public affairs.

Sunni Islam in Iraq has historically been administered through state-supported religious endowments (''awqaf''), which oversee mosques, religious schools, and charitable institutions. During the Ba'athist period, Sunni religious institutions were closely supervised by the state through the Ministry of Religious Endowments. Since 2003, Sunni religious administration has undergone significant restructuring, with separate Sunni and Shia endowment bodies managing their respective religious institutions.

== Demographics ==
The data on the religious affiliation of Iraq's population is uncertain. 95–99% of the population are Muslims. A 2015 estimate by the CIA World Factbook reported that 64-69% of Iraqis were Shia Muslims and 29–34% were Sunni Muslims. According to a 2011 survey by Pew Research, 51% of the Muslims identified as Shia and 42% as Sunni. David Smock of the United States Institute of Peace stated in 2003 that Shiites constituted about 55-60% of the Muslim population and Sunnis represented 35-40%.

Iraqi Sunni Arabs mainly inhabit the provinces of Al-Anbar, Salah al-Din, Nineveh, Kirkuk, Diyala, and parts of Baghdad. Iraqi Sunni Arabs are split into multiple tribes, including Dulaim, Al-Bu Nasir, Al-Bu Nimr, Al-Ubaid, Otaibah, Shammar and Mutayr.

== Islam in law ==
Islam is the official religion of Iraq and the source of its legislation.

In 1968 the Ministry of the Interior prohibited miniskirts, citing sharia law.

== Gallery ==
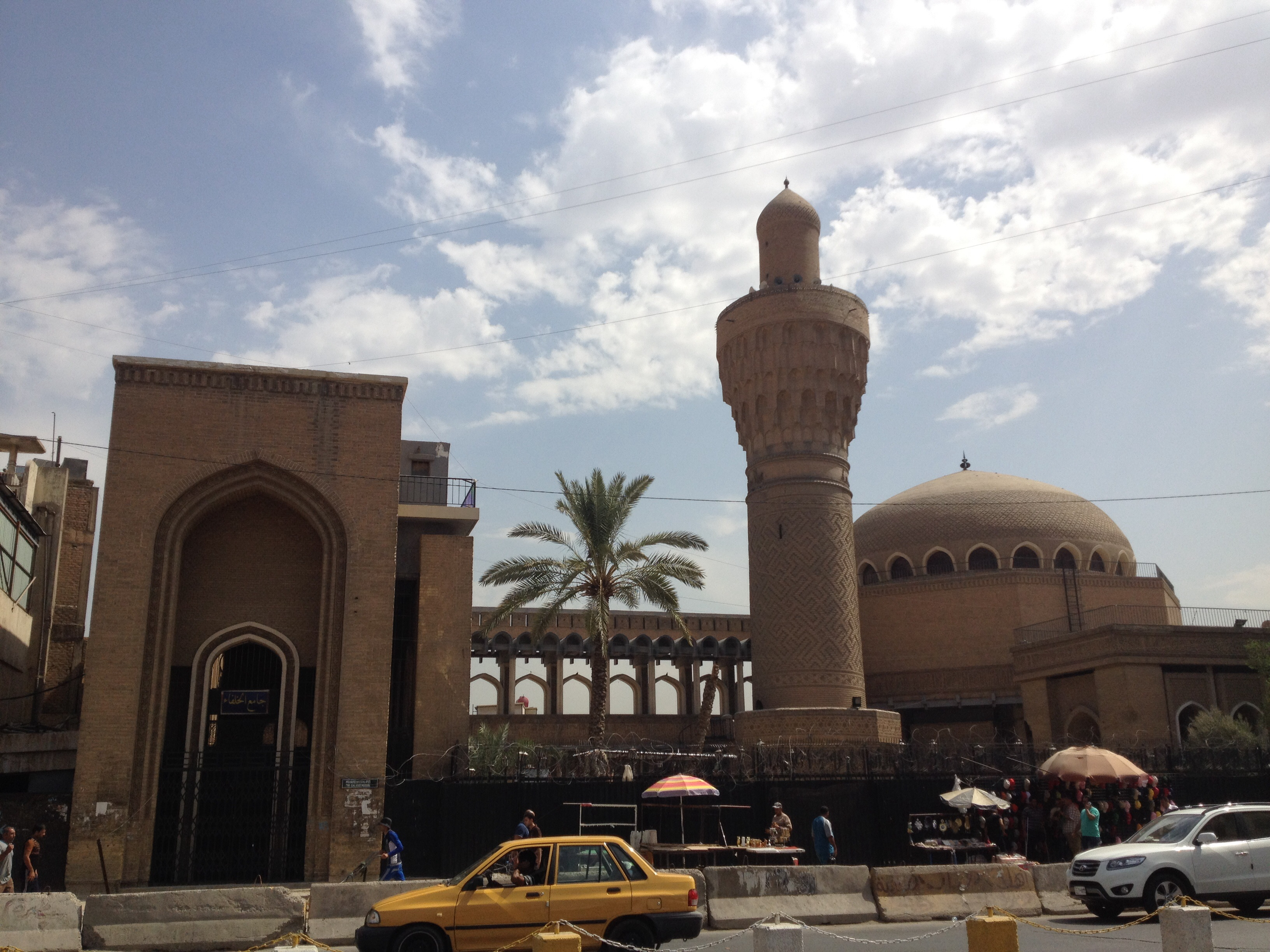
Al-Khulafa Mosque, Baghdad

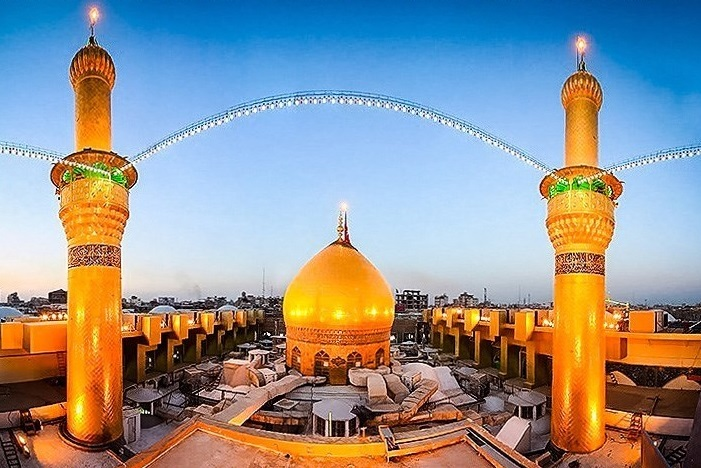
Imam Husayn Shrine, Karbala

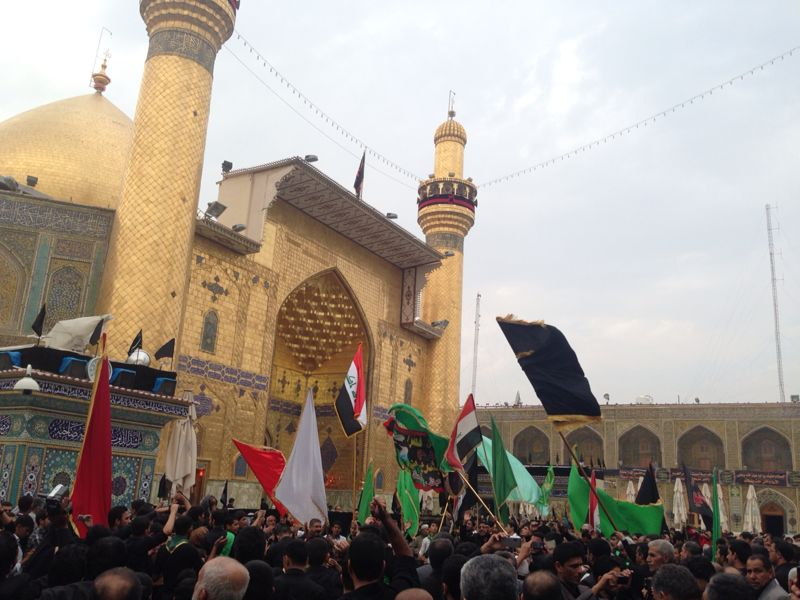
Shia commemorating Muharam in the holy city of Karbala

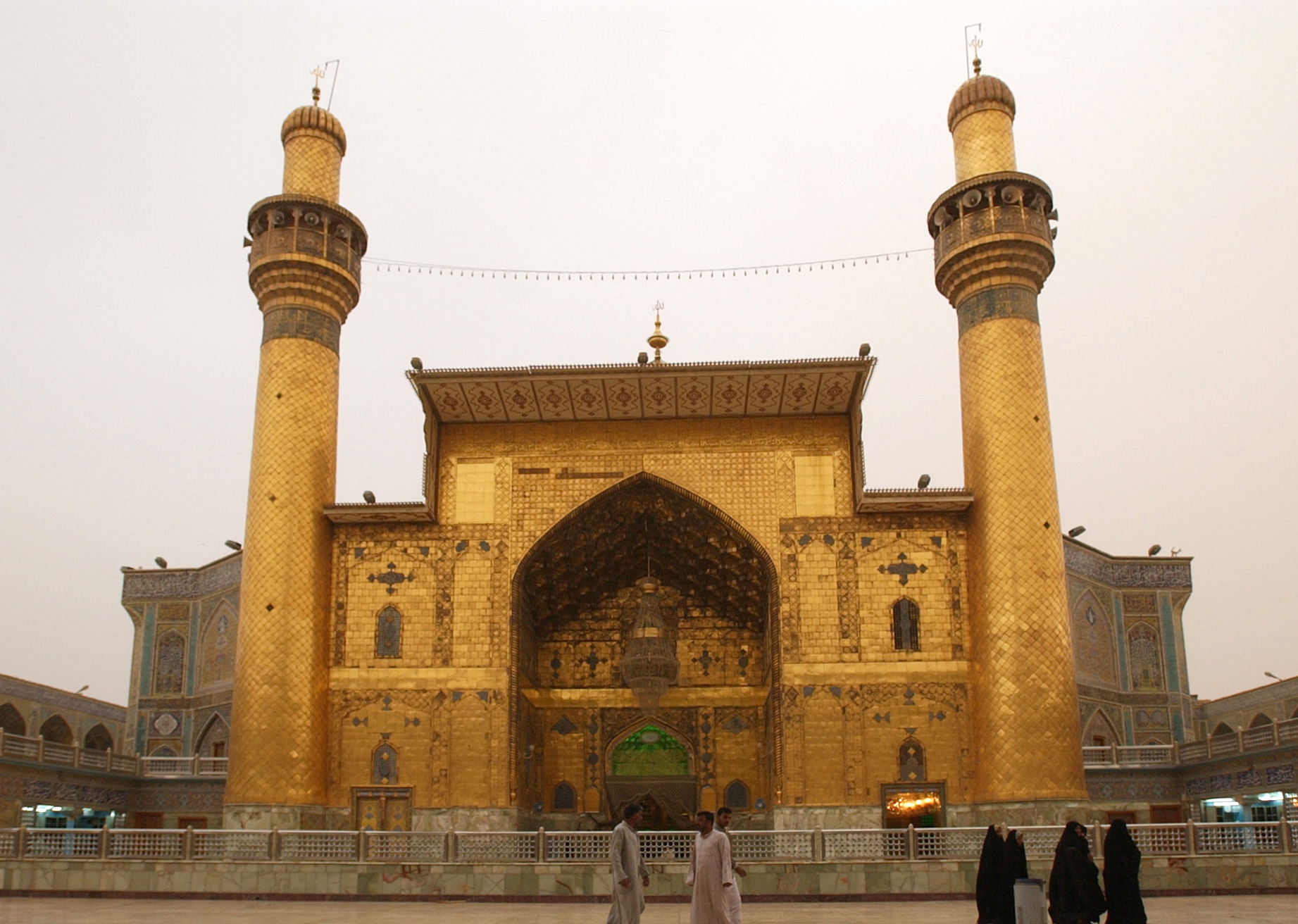
Imam Ali Shrine, Najaf

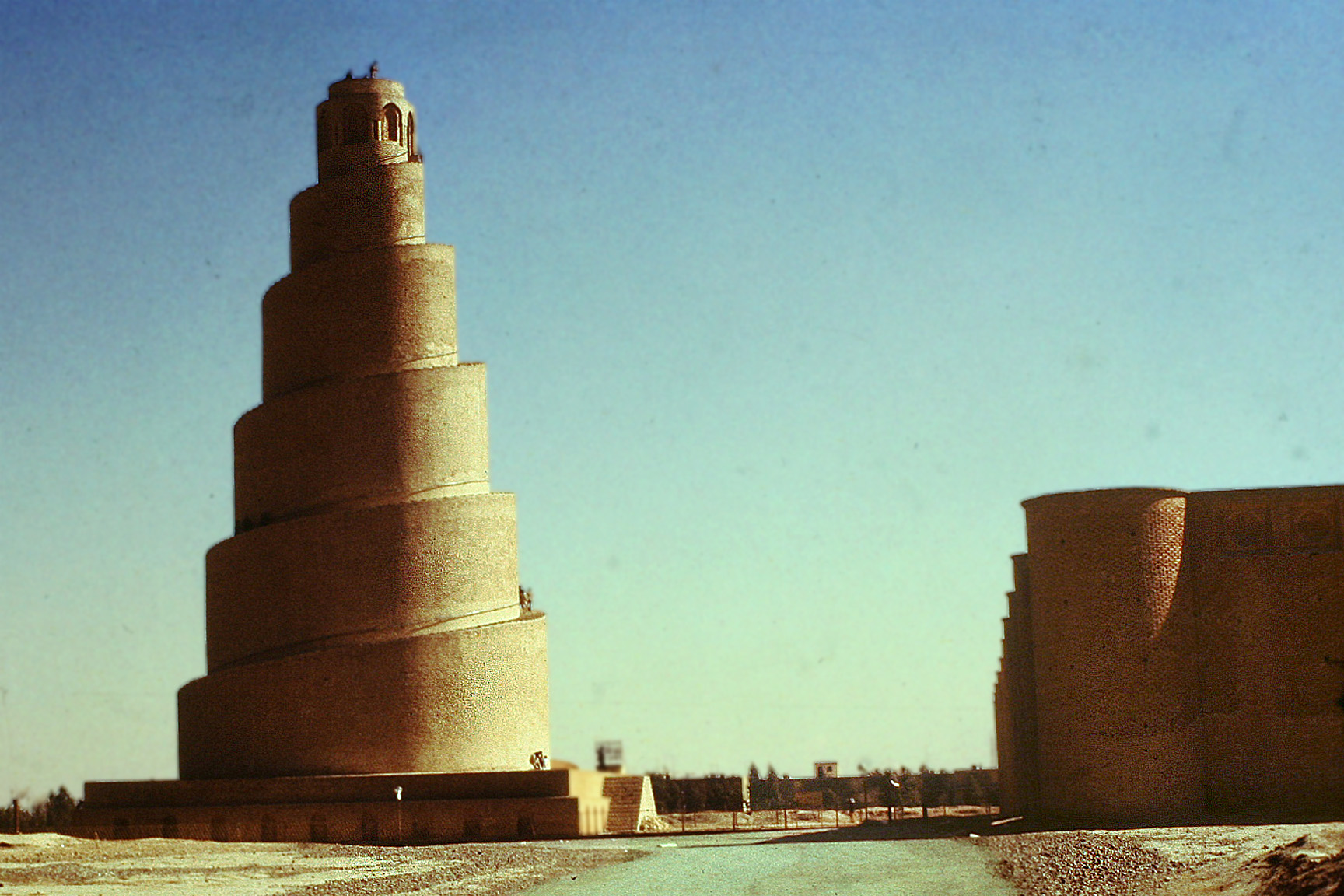
The spiral minaret of the Great Mosque of Samarra

== See also ==
- Demographics of Iraq
- Religion in Iraq
- List of mosques in Baghdad
- Iraqi Sunni Arabs
- Iraqi Shia Arabs
