= Oriental Orthodoxy in Iraq =

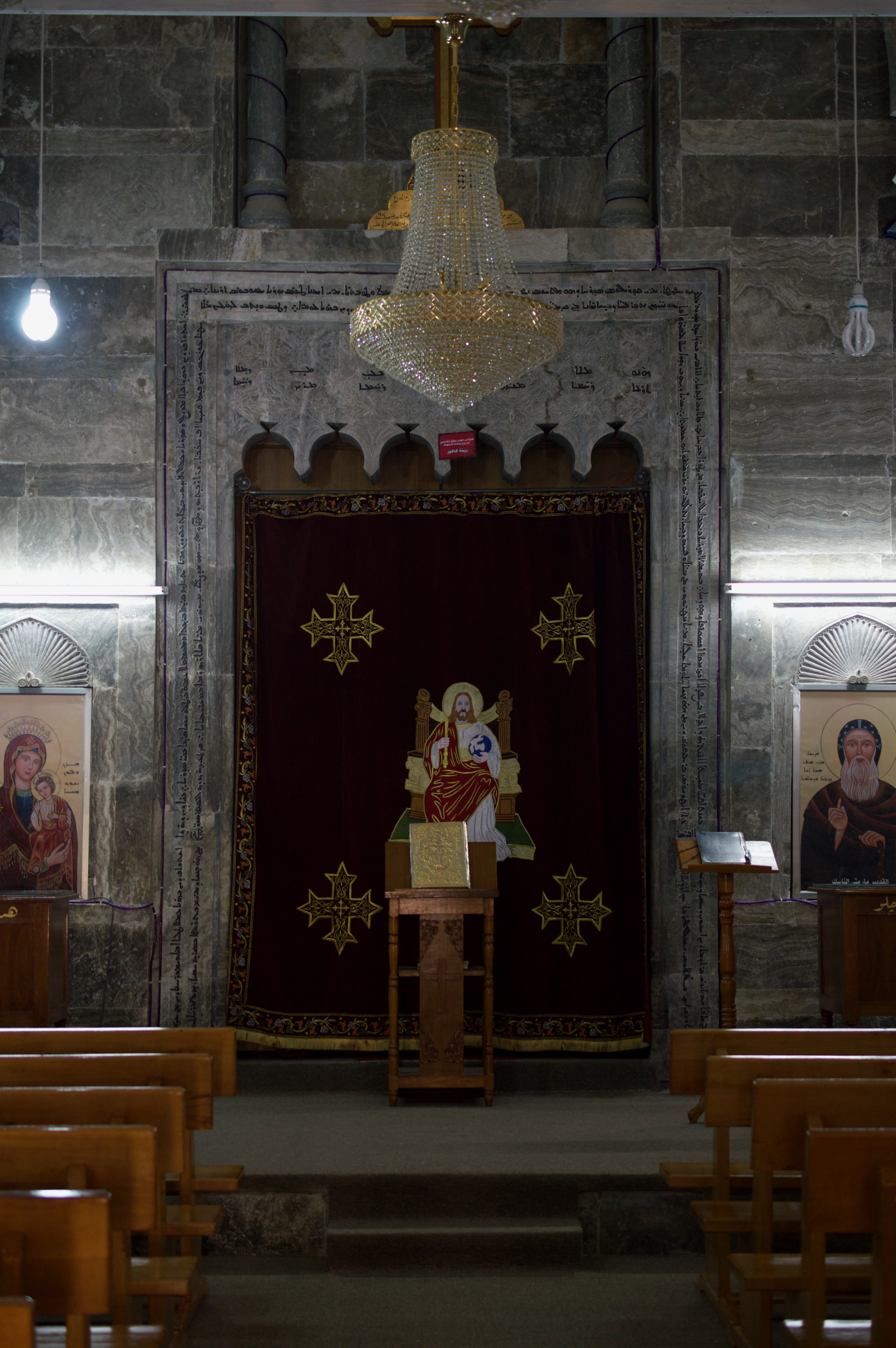
Syriac Orthodox Mar Mattai Monastery near Mosul

Oriental Orthodoxy is the second largest Christian denomination in Iraq after the collective Eastern Catholic Churches. It includes the Syriac Orthodox Church, headed by a patriarch in Damascus, and the Armenian Apostolic Church, which serves the population of Armenians in Iraq. A sizable population have fled from Iraq following the US invasion and subsequent conflicts. Most Oriental Orthodox Christians are of ethnic Iraqi-Assyrian heritage, who make up about 500,000. The other significant minority of Oriental Orthodox Christians are ethnic Armenians. Christians are present in Baghdad, Basra, Mosul and northern Iraq.

== History ==
The early history of Oriental Orthodoxy on the territory of modern-day Iraq was marked by constant Byzantine-Sasanian wars during the period between 5th and 7th century. In that period, major part of the Mesopotamia region was ruled by the Sassanian Empire (Persia). Since official Persian religion was Zoroastrianism, all Christian communities in the region were under constant pressure, and suffered occasional persecutions. Also, relations between different Christian communities was marked by frequent theological disputes and constant rivalry.

During that time, Oriental Orthodox Christians in the region kept their traditional ties with the Syriac Orthodox Patriarchate of Antioch. In order to consolidate ecclesiastical structure of Oriental Orthodox churches within the Sassanian Empire, the Patriarchate decided to appoint theologian Marutha of Tikrit as metropolitan over all Oriental Orthodox dioceses in the Empire (629), granting him the title of maphrian.

== Oriental Orthodox Dioceses and Churches in Iraq ==
There are 3 dioceses belong to the Syriac Orthodox Church, 1 diocese belongs to the Armenian Apostolic Orthodox Church, and some churches belong to the Coptic Orthodox Archdiocese of Jerusalem.

- Syrian Orthodox Archbishopric of Mosul, Kirkuk and Kurdistan under the spiritual guidance and direction of Archbishop Nicodimus Dawood Sharaf.
- Syrian Orthodox Archbishopric of Baghdad and Basrah under the spiritual guidance and direction of Archbishop Severius Jamil Hawa
- Syrian Orthodox Archbishopric of St Matthew's Monastery under the spiritual guidance and direction of Archbishop Timothius Mousa Shamani.
- Armenian Orthodox Diocese of Iraq under the spiritual guidance and direction of Bishop Oshakan Kulkolian.
- Coptic Orthodox Churches belongs to the Coptic Orthodox Archdiocese of Jerusalem, under the spiritual guidance and direction of Archbishop Antonios.

== See also ==
- Christianity in Iraq
- Eastern Orthodoxy in Iraq
- Persecution of Christians in Iraq
- Human rights in Iraq
- Freedom of religion in Iraq

== Sources ==
- Baarda, Tijmen C. (2020). "Arabic and the Syriac Christians in Iraq: Three Levels of Loyalty to the Arabist Project (1920-1950)". Arabic and its Alternatives: Religious Minorities and their Languages in the Emerging Nation States of the Middle East (1920-1950). Leiden-Boston: Brill. pp. 143–170. doi:10.1163/9789004423220_007. ISBN 978-90-04-42322-0.
- Hunter, Erica C. D. (2019). "Changing Demography: Christians in Iraq since 1991". The Syriac World. London: Routledge. pp. 783–796. ISBN 978-1-138-89901-8.
- Joseph, John B. (1983). Muslim-Christian Relations and Inter-Christian Rivalries in the Middle East: The Case of the Jacobites in an Age of Transition. Albany: State University of New York Press. ISBN 978-0-87395-600-0.
- Meyendorff, John (1989). Imperial unity and Christian divisions: The Church 450-680 A.D. Crestwood, NY: St. Vladimir's Seminary Press. ISBN 978-0-88141-056-3.
- O’Mahony, Anthony (2006). "Syriac Christianity in the modern Middle East". The Cambridge History of Christianity: Eastern Christianity. Vol. 5. Cambridge: Cambridge University Press. pp. 511–536. ISBN 978-0-521-81113-2.
- Rassam, Suha (2005). Christianity in Iraq: Its Origins and Development to the Present Day. Leominster: Gracewing Publishing. ISBN 978-0-85244-633-1.
- Schmidinger, Thomas (2019). "Christians in Iraq". Beyond ISIS: History and Future of Religious Minorities in Iraq. London: Transnational Press. pp. 113–124. ISBN 978-1-912997-15-2.
- Teule, Herman G. B. (2009). "The Christian Minorities in Iraq: The Question of Religious and Ethnic Identity". In-Between Spaces: Christian and Muslim Minorities in Transition in Europe and the Middle East. Brussel: Peter Lang. pp. 45–57. ISBN 978-90-5201-565-1.
- Winkler, Dietmar W. (2013). "Christianity in the Middle East: Some historical remarks and preliminary demographic figures". Syriac Christianity in the Middle East and India: Contributions and Challenges. Piscataway, NJ: Gorgias Press. pp. 107–125. doi:10.31826/9781463235864-011. ISBN 978-1-4632-3586-4.
- Whooley, John (2010). "The Armenian Church in the contemporary Middle East". Eastern Christianity in the Modern Middle East. London-New York: Routledge. pp. 78–106. ISBN 978-1-135-19371-3.
