= Eastern Orthodoxy in Iraq =

Eastern Orthodoxy in Iraq refers to adherents, communities and institutions of Eastern Orthodox Christianity in Iraq. Within the ecclesiastical order of the Eastern Orthodox Church, territory of Iraq traditionally belongs to patrimonial jurisdiction of the Eastern Orthodox Patriarchate of Antioch and All the East. The Patriarchate has a diocese in Iraq, the Eastern Orthodox Archdiocese of Baghdad, headed since 2014 by Metropolitan Ghattas Hazim.

== History ==
The early history of Eastern Orthodoxy in the region of Mesopotamia (within the territory of modern-day Iraq) was marked by frequent Byzantine-Sasanian wars, fought between the 5th and 7th century. During much of that period, major part of Mesopotamia was controlled by the Sassanian Empire (Persia). Official Persian religion was Zoroastrianism, while Christianity was occasionally tolerated or persecuted, depending on the current religious or political climate. Attitudes of Persian rulers towards their Christian subjects was affected mainly by current political relations with the Byzantine Empire, seen by Persians as the rivaling power with considerable and worrying influence on Christian communities within Persian borders. Since Byzantine government generally favored Eastern Orthodoxy over other Christian denominations, local communities of Eastern Orthodox Christians within the Persian borders were often treated with suspicion by Persian authorities, who were slightly more tolerant to other Christian communities. During that period, relations between different Christian groups in Mesopotamia were marked by frequent theological disputes and internal divisions. Religious and political pressure led to the decline of Eastern Orthodoxy in Mesopotamia. During that period, Eastern Orthodox patriarchs of Antioch, centered within the Byzantine borders, had great difficulties in maintaining ties with remaining Eastern Orthodox communities in Mesopotamia. By the time of the Arab conquest of Mesopotamia in the 7th century, Eastern Orthodoxy in that region was reduced to small minority.

During the period of Arab and later Turkish rule in Mesopotamia, from the 7th century up to the end of the First World War, communities of Eastern Orthodox Christians in the region remained under ecclesiastical jurisdiction of the Eastern Orthodox Patriarchate of Antioch. After the creation of modern Iraq, legal position of Christian communities in the country was much improved. In 1969, Eastern Orthodox Christians in Iraq got a new and able leader, metropolitan Constantine Papastephanou of Baghdad, sent to them by the Patriarchate of Antioch. During his long tenure, internal organization of the Baghdad Archdiocese was much improved. On the other hand, later devastating wars ad conflict in Iraq greatly affected the entire population of the country, including Eastern Orthodox Christians and their religious institutions. In 2014, Metropolitan Constantine retired and was succeeded by Ghattas Hazim as the new metropolitan of Baghdad. Since the territory of his Archdiocese were severely affected by previous conflicts, upon arriving in Baghdad new metropolitan was faced with many inherited problems, starting from the fact that over 90% of the Eastern Orthodox Christians in the country were still displaced, as a result of previous wars and internal conflicts in Iraq. Because of that, official seat of the diocese only formally remains in Baghdad, while administrative headquarters are located in neighbouring Kuwait, territorially also under jurisdiction of the Baghdad Archdiocese.

== See also ==
- Christianity in Iraq
- Oriental Orthodoxy in Iraq
- Persecution of Christians in Iraq
- Human rights in Iraq
- Freedom of religion in Iraq
- Minorities in Iraq
- Christian Arabs

== Sources ==
- Brock, Sebastian P. (1982). "Christians in the Sasanian Empire: A Case of Divided Loyalties". Studies in Church History. 18: 1–19.
- Meyendorff, John (1989). Imperial unity and Christian divisions: The Church 450-680 A.D. Crestwood, NY: St. Vladimir's Seminary Press.
- Ostrogorsky, George (1956). History of the Byzantine State. Oxford: Basil Blackwell.
- Schmidinger, Thomas (2019). "Christians in Iraq". Beyond ISIS: History and Future of Religious Minorities in Iraq. London: Transnational Press. pp. 113–124.
- Rassam, Suha (2005). Christianity in Iraq: Its Origins and Development to the Present Day. Leominster: Gracewing Publishing.
- Roussos, Sotiris (2010). "Eastern Orthodox Christianity in the Middle East". Eastern Christianity in the Modern Middle East. London-New York: Routledge. pp. 107–119.
