= Freedom of religion in Iraq =

According to the most recent government statistics, 97% of the population of Iraq was Muslim in 2010 (60% Shia and 40% Sunni); the constitution states that Islam is the official religion of the country.

In 2023, Iraq was scored 1 out of 4 for religious freedom.

In the same year, it was ranked as the 18th worst place in the world to be a Christian.

== Background ==
In the 2010s, uprisings of the Islamic State (IS), formerly called the Islamic State of Iraq and the Levant (ISIL) or the Islamic State of Iraq and Syria (ISIS), have led to violations of religious freedom in certain parts of Iraq. IS is a Sunni jihadist group that claims religious authority over all Muslims around the world and aspires to bring most of the Muslim-inhabited regions of the world under its political control beginning with Iraq. ISIS follows an extreme anti-Western interpretation of Islam, promotes religious violence and regards those who do not agree with its interpretations as infidels or apostates. Concurrently, IS aims to establish a Salafist-orientated Islamist state in Iraq, Syria and other parts of the Levant.

As ISIL lost territory throughout Iraq in 2016, the armed forces and allied militias restored crosses, and Christians were allowed to return to their homes.

== Status of religious freedom ==
In 2006 The Globe correspondent Khidir Domle stated that the Kurdistan Regional Government (KRG) engaged in discriminatory behaviour against Christians, and that according to Assyrian Christians, the Kurdistan Democratic Party (KDP)-dominated judiciary did so routinely against Assyrians, failing to enforce judgments in their favour. The KRG rejected these accusations.

In 2022, local and international NGOs reported that the government continued to use antiterrorism laws as a pretext for detaining individuals without due process (mostly Sunni Arabs). Yezidis and Christians have also reported verbal and physically abuse from local people; in September 2022, members of the local police and a private security company connected with the Shia militia Kata’ib Hezbollah (KH) threatened to evict 400 internally displaced Christians from the Mariam al-Adra IDP camp in Baghdad.

In 2022, ISIS were still in active in Iraq, carrying out kidnappings and murders; PKK activity is also ongoing.

=== Recognition ===
The government recognizes the following religious groups; Muslims, Chaldeans, Assyrians, Assyrian Catholics, Syriac Orthodox, Syriac Catholics, Armenian Apostolic, Armenian Catholics, Roman Catholics, National Protestants, Anglicans, Evangelical Protestant Assyrians, Seventh-day Adventists, Coptic Orthodox, Yezidis, Sabean-Mandeans, and Jews; all recognized religious groups (except Yezidis) have their own personal-status courts which handle marriage, divorce and inheritance issues. Baha’i, Zoroastrian and Kaka’i groups are not allowed to register with the government, although they are recognized in Kurdish areas; Baha'ism is illegal.

=== Education ===
Government regulations require three classes a week of Islamic instruction in public schools - non-Muslim students are not required to participate; there is no requirement for religious education in Kurdish areas.

=== Identity cards ===
In 2016, the country started issuing identity cards - cards do not denote the bearer’s religion, although the application form requires this information, and it is held on the card's data chip. Citizens must identify as Christian, Sabean-Mandean, Yezidi, Jewish, or Muslim.

=== Conversion laws ===
The law prohibits the conversion of Muslims to other religions; where one person is Muslim or converts to Islam, their children are automatically seen as Muslim.

== See also ==
- Religion in Iraq
- Human rights in Iraq
