= List of Jewish sites in Iraq =

Overview of Jewish sites in Iraq

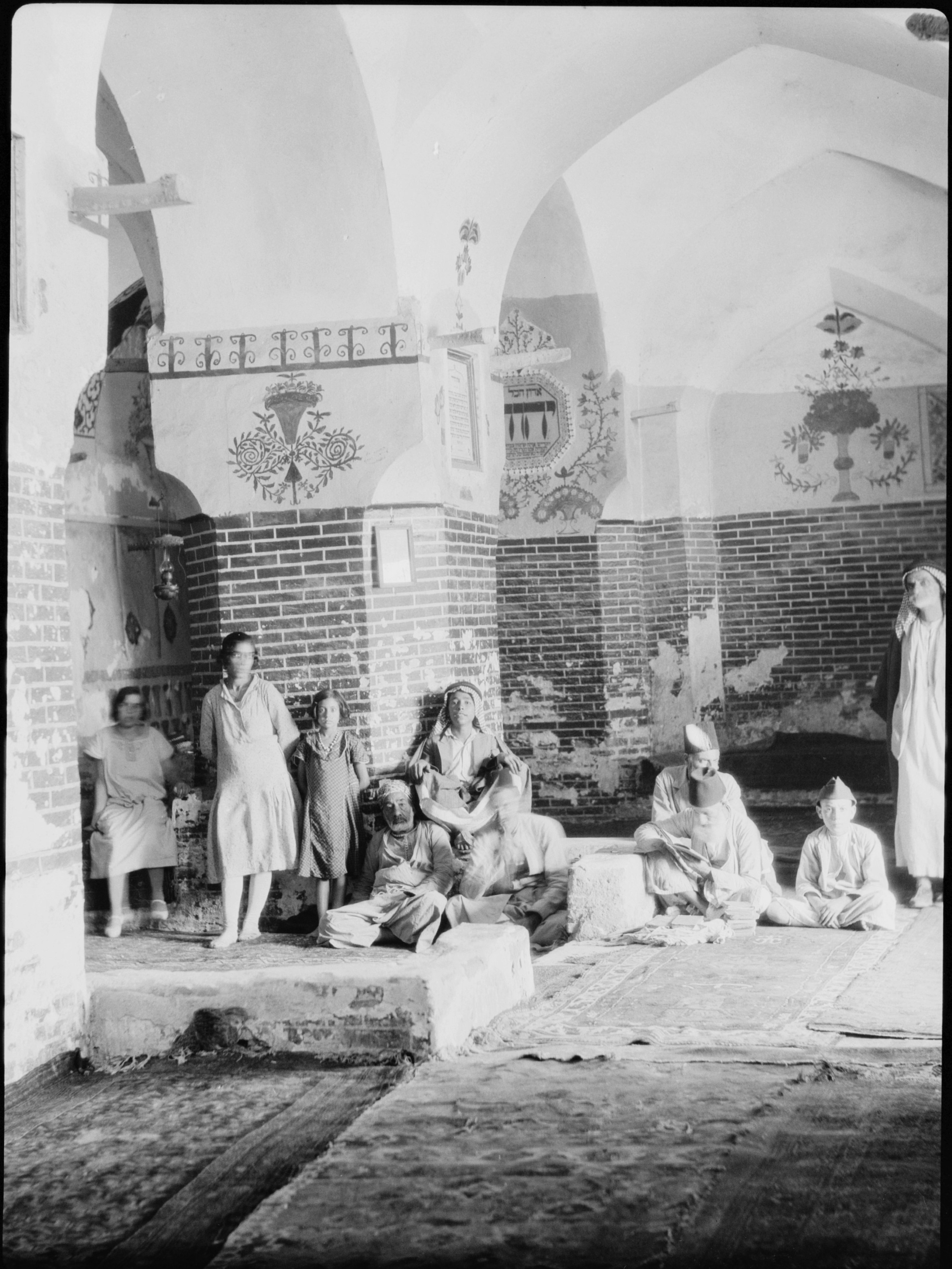
Iraqi Jews inside the Tomb of Ezekiel in the town of al-Kifl, c. 1932.

Before the Jewish exodus from the Muslim world, Iraq was home to one of the largest and oldest Jewish communities in the Middle East. Most of them lived in Baghdad, followed by Basra, Mosul, Kirkuk, Hillah, and other major cities. A significant community of Kurdish Jews also existed in Erbil. After Israel, Iraq is home to the next largest number of Jewish sites in the world. The history of some of these sites date back over a thousand years. Most of them were abandoned and left in ruins between 1941 and 1951 when the Iraqi Jews, also known as Babylonian Jews, left the country in large numbers. These sites were well protected during the regime of former Iraqi president Saddam Hussein, but their conditions deteriorated after the 2003 invasion of Iraq.

Since the Jewish exodus from Iraq, many Jewish properties, including synagogues and schools, have been repurposed as government warehouses. Some have also been converted into churches, mosques, or Shi'i tombs. However, there has been recent local interest in the restoration of some of those sites by the Muslim and Christian populations that the sites belong to. Especially due to their historical and cultural significance.

This list includes notable Jewish sites in Iraq, including both current and former historical sites.

== Sites in Baghdad ==
Baghdad had the highest concentration of the Iraqi Jewish population. Previously, the city was home to 60 synagogues, schools, hospitals, and health clinics, all of which were owned by Jews. The number of functioning synagogues decreased as the Jewish population dwindled. By the 1970s, only a few synagogues remained in Baghdad, which were in a good state. However, many were abandoned, as not enough Jews were to hold services in all those synagogues. It is estimated that only 100 Jews remain in Baghdad. The city also contains al-Habibiyah Jewish Cemetery which is an old cemetery containing graves of several Jewish Baghdadis.

=== Synagogues ===
==== Great Synagogue of Baghdad ====
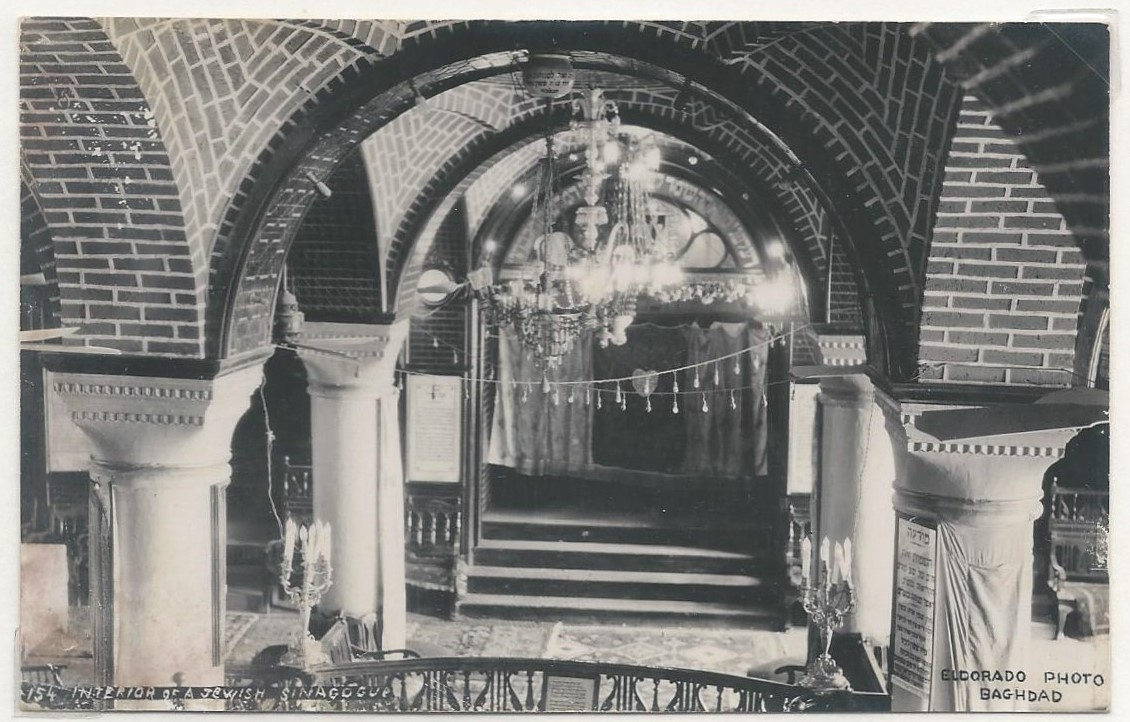
The Great Synagogue in 1942.

The Great Synagogue of Baghdad is the oldest in Baghdad, originally built by the exiled King of Judah, Jeconiah, in the city of Nehardea in Babylon, roughly around 597 BCE. It was a significant institution for the exiled Jews during the Babylonian captivity. Jews of Iraq attended it under the rules of the Babylonians, Persians, continuing even after Alexander the Great's conquest of Persia. The synagogue was later moved to the newly built Baghdad. Under the Abbasid Caliphate, it became known as Slat le-Kbiri (The Great Synagogue). The Great Synagogue remained active until the Jewish exodus from Iraq, after which the fate of the ancient synagogue remained unclear.

The original name of the synagogue in Nehardea was Shaf weYativ Synagogue, a name that also carried to Baghdad. Due to its ancient significance, other synagogues in Iraq followed in its architectural form. The synagogue has been rebuilt several times, and now its main structure serves as a Jewish museum.

==== The Farha Synagogue ====
The Farha Synagogue is located in the heart of the historic Jewish quarter of Shorja. It was named after Farha Sassoon, wife of David Sassoon, who belonged to a notable Jewish family of Baghdad. After the decline of the Jewish community in Iraq, the synagogue is no longer in use. It gained prominence in a controversy in 2011, during the time of Nouri al-Maliki.

==== Meir Taweig Synagogue ====
The Meir Tawieg Synagogue was built in 1942 and named after Iraqi businessman Meir Tawieg. The synagogue is noted for its ornate style of architecture. It contains a large library, a community center, and a Jewish school. During the 1940s, it was used as a registration center for Jews who left Iraq. The synagogue was restored and expanded during the regime of former Iraqi president Saddam Hussein in 1988. Today, it is the only active synagogue, which is under the care of a small group of Iraqi Jews.

==== Masuda Synagogue ====
The Masuda Synagogue is located behind the Masuda House in the former Jewish quarter of the Shorja. Currently, it is surrounded by numerous marketplaces, mosques, and churches. It was site a famous bombing incident. The synagogue was damaged during the 1950–1951 Baghdad bombings, where the Jewish community was targeted.

==== Other synagogues ====
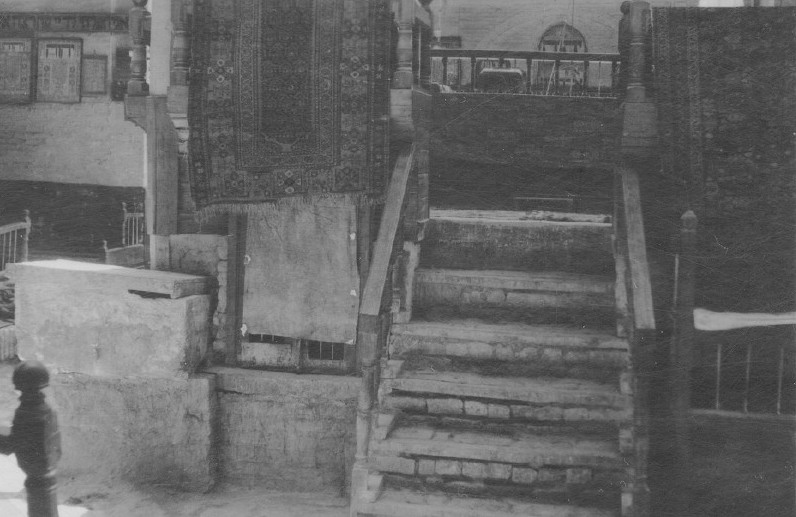
Bimah of the Dina Synagogue in Baghdad, 1942

Other known synagogues in Baghdad include the Ezra Abu Dawud Synagogue, and the Dina Synagogue.

=== Jewish tombs ===
==== Tomb of Isaac Gaon ====
The Tomb of Isaac Gaon is named after Isaac Gaon, a medieval 10th-century Gaon who lived in the Abbasid Caliphate during the era of the Rabbinic Geonim. Isaac Gaon was a jurist known for writing religious letters and legal responses to the Jewish communities. His tomb is located in the Qanbar Ali neighborhood. Starting in 2025, the shrine has undergone a restoration project that included the removal of large amounts of trash that had been dumped inside. A school and synagogue had been at the site, which over time had been reduced to the location of the tomb of Rabbi Isaac, which had been long-venerated as a place of prayer and healing, particularly for fertility.

==== Tomb of Joshua the High Priest ====
The Tomb of Joshua the High Priest is also in Baghdad. This Jewish site that entombs Joshua the son of Jehozadak, also known as Joshua Cohen Kadol, who was the first High Priest after the return of the Jews from the Babylonian Captivity. The tomb is believed to date back to the 6th century BCE and has become a site for prayers, blessings, and cultural heritage. The shrine is located in the Sheikh Ma'ruf Cemetery.

=== Educational institutions ===
Baghdad had several Rabbinic and Jewish academic schools, including schools for studying and reciting the Torah and the Talmud. The most notable examples of these are:

==== Midrash Beth Zilkha ====
The Midrash Beth Zilkha was a significant beth midrash in Baghdad, founded by the philanthropist Baghdadi grandee Ezekiel Reuben in 1840. It was respected among the Eastern Jewry, and was once visited by the traveler J. J. Benjamin in 1848. Ezekiel established a large endowment whose income was allotted to finance students who studied in the study hall. The study hall's scholars and teachers had independence from the hierarchy of the rabbinic leadership at the time. It is also famous for having its first and main head be Abdallah Somekh, a renowned hakham and rabbi who taught students the Torah and oversaw their development. He remained its head until his death in 1889.

==== Midrash Talmud Torah ====
Founded by Rabbi Aharon Moshi Lawi around 1832, the purpose of the school was to enhance the religious knowledge of its students. The students were chosen from the Baghdadi Jewish families based on their ages and mental abilities. The school had 18 classrooms with each having a Rabbi assigned to. However, the school only allowed male students as female students were not allowed to enroll. The maximum period a student was allowed to stay in the Midrash was only nine years which was considered a part of a cultural shift in Baghdadi Jewish culture. The Midrash remained active for at least 120 years and was significant in giving the Baghdadi Jewish community high education.

==== Shamash School ====
The Shamash School was an Iraqi English-speaking Jewish high school located on al-Rashid Street in the Haydar-Khana area, named after its founder, Yaqub Shlomo Shamash. Supported by the Anglo-Jewish Association, it attracted many young Jewish boys interested in English culture and allowed its graduates to enroll in British universities without a language test. The school was merged with another school, the Frank Inny School, in 1949. Ironically, its founder resided in Nice, France, but was assumed to prefer English over French.

In October 2026, the site of the school was opened as a Jewish Heritage Museum, funded by expatriate Jews of Iraqi descent. The museum provides archival materials and recorded interviews highlighting the history of a community that had accounted for 25% of Baghdad's population and reached 90,000 across Iraq early in the 20th century but had dwindled in the wake of the 1941 Farhud and rising antisemitism, with as few as a half dozen Jews remaining at the time of the museum's opening.

== Sites in Hillah ==
In 1910, around 500 Iraqi Jews were living in the city of Hillah, and they had two main synagogues. The first was the old Great Synagogue, named for its larger size compared to the second one. It contained a tomb for a Jewish noble with a rare type of stone brought by a Jew named Shikuri. The second was the smaller David Sassoon synagogue built around 1862/3 and named after its builder, David Sassoon. The synagogue was built next to a yeshiva that was dedicated to the Abrahamic prophet Ezekiel. The bimah of the David Sassoon synagogue also featured a large tree that, as of 1910, was over a hundred years old.

=== Tomb of Ezekiel ===
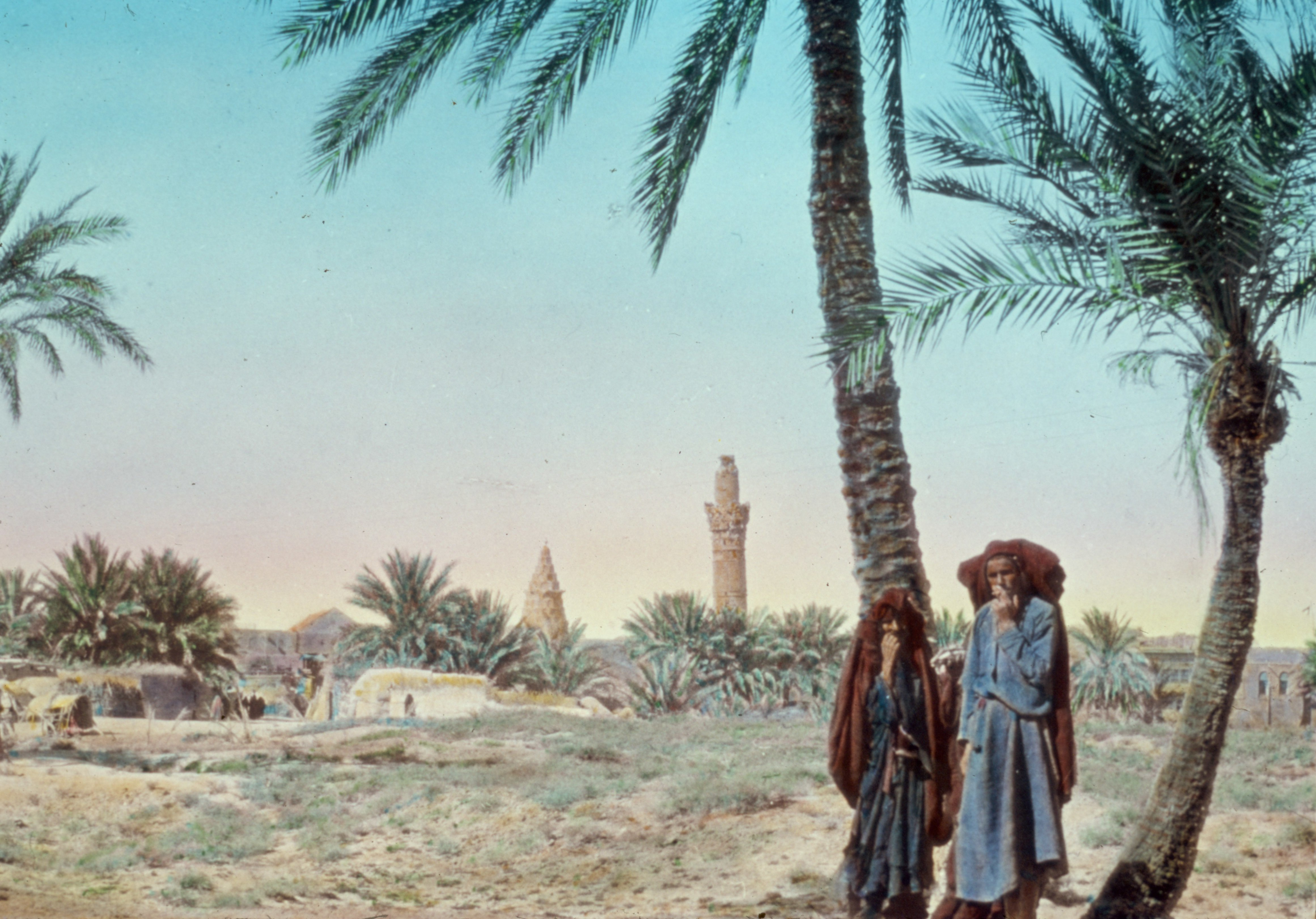
The building housing the Tomb of Ezekiel as viewed between the 1950s and 1970s.

Nearby Hillah is the smaller village of al-Kifl, which contains the Tomb of the Abrahamic prophet Ezekiel, who was deported from the Kingdom of Judah during the Babylonian captivity and serves as the eponymous protagonist of the Book of Ezekiel in the Hebrew Bible. Historically, it is the oldest and most important Jewish site in Iraq. The site is traditionally believed to have been part of assets and lands belonging to the exiled King Jeconiah. Benjamin of Tudela, who has visited the site, documented that an estimated 60,000 to 80,000 Jews visit the site during the week of Sukkot, as well as mawlid and festivals related to Ezekiel by Muslims. He also documents that the caliphal power respected and maintained the site, and that Arab merchants typically came to the site to sell their goods. The site was also repaired by David Sassoon in 1859, who also gave it a parochet sent from Mumbai.

Although the site is Jewish, it was also visited and respected by Muslims due to their association of Ezekiel with the unnamed Qur'anic prophet Dhu al-Kifl. Although the shrine is historically significant to both Jews and Muslims, in 1860 Ottoman viceroy of the Baghdad vilayet, Mustafa Nuri Pasha, attempted to stir controversy by claiming that the site belonged to Muslims only due to having a minaret. This caused controversy among the people of al-Kifl and Baghdad; a special minister from Istanbul was sent to investigate the matter, and he ruled in favor of the Jews.

== Other sites in Southern Iraq ==
=== Al-'Ashar Synagogue ===
The Torah Synagogue, also known as al-'Ashar Synagogue, was an old synagogue located in al-'Ashar neighborhood of Basra. It served as a meeting area for the Jewish community living in Basra, who also owned several shops in the area. It has since been converted into a commercial warehouse after the exodus. Many of its Jewish artifacts have also been subjected to looting and vandalism. The synagogue was originally abandoned in 1991 due to a faulty nationalization act. However, in 2009, citizens of Basra showed interest in reviving the synagogue and restoring it despite being under the control of Shi'i militias supported by Iran.

=== Basra Jewish Cemetery ===
Due to Basra's sizable Jewish population before the exodus, there was a large cemetery in the city housing the graves of many Jews who lived in Basra. Although 62 houses were illegally built on the cemetery, a campaign was launched in 2008 to clean up the cemetery due to its cultural significance.

=== Tomb of Ezra ===
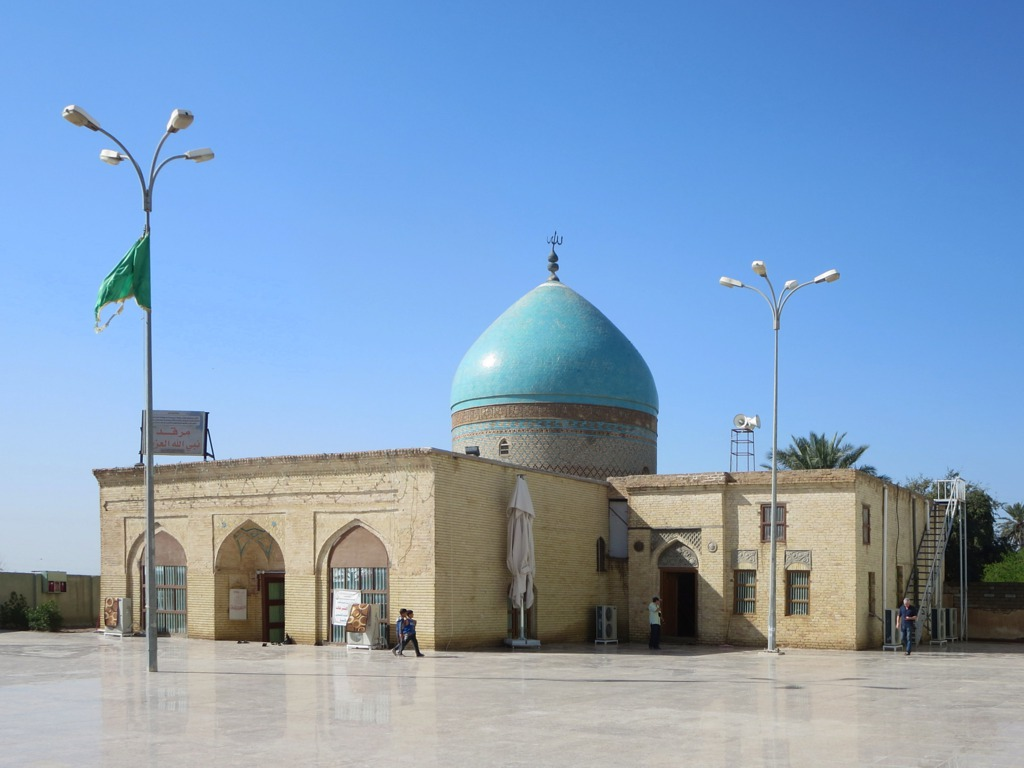
The Tomb of Ezra as pictured on 13 June 2016.

This shrine contains the tomb of the Abrahamic prophet Ezra according to Jewish Babylonian tradition. It is located on the west bank of the Tigris River, about 48 kilometers away from Shatt al-Arab, north of Basra. Although Ezra was an instrumental figure in the return of the Jewish people from the Babylonian captivity, Jewish Babylonians cited Iraq as his burial site. A tradition claims that Ezra died in Iraq while visiting the Persian King Artaxerxes I; however, there is no solid evidence to support this. Regardless, the shrine has also been visited by both Muslims and Jews. It contains both a Jewish prayer area and a mosque. The site was visited by Benjamin of Tudela who further noted that the two communities lived in peace without a conflict of ownership. Thus the tomb has been a ziyara site for both Muslims and Jews coming from as far as Israel.

The present building, which is, unusually, a joint Muslim and Jewish shrine, is possibly over two centuries old. It features an enclosing wall and a blue-tiled dome, as well as a separate synagogue, which, although now disused, has been kept in good repair in recent times. There are Hebrew inscriptions of the wooden casket, the dedication plaque, and large Hebrew letters of God's name that are still prominently maintained in the worshiping room. Until 2003, the remaining number of Jews visited the site and were allowed to pray.

== Sites in Mosul ==
=== Nineveh synagogues ===
During the 2003 US-led invasion, a rabbi in the American army found an abandoned, dilapidated synagogue near Mosul dating back to the 13th century that still maintained Hebrew engraving on its walls. It is located 3.2 kilometers northeast of Mosul, across the Tigris River, in the ancient Mesopotamian city of Nineveh, the city to which the Abrahamic prophet Jonah was sent to preach repentance. The Nineveh Synagogue was constructed by Daud Ibn Hodaya al-Daudi, Exilarch of Mosul. There is a record of a second synagogue in Mosul, as early as 990, mentioned by the Gaon of Sura, Semah ibn Yitzhak.

=== Sassoon Synagogue ===
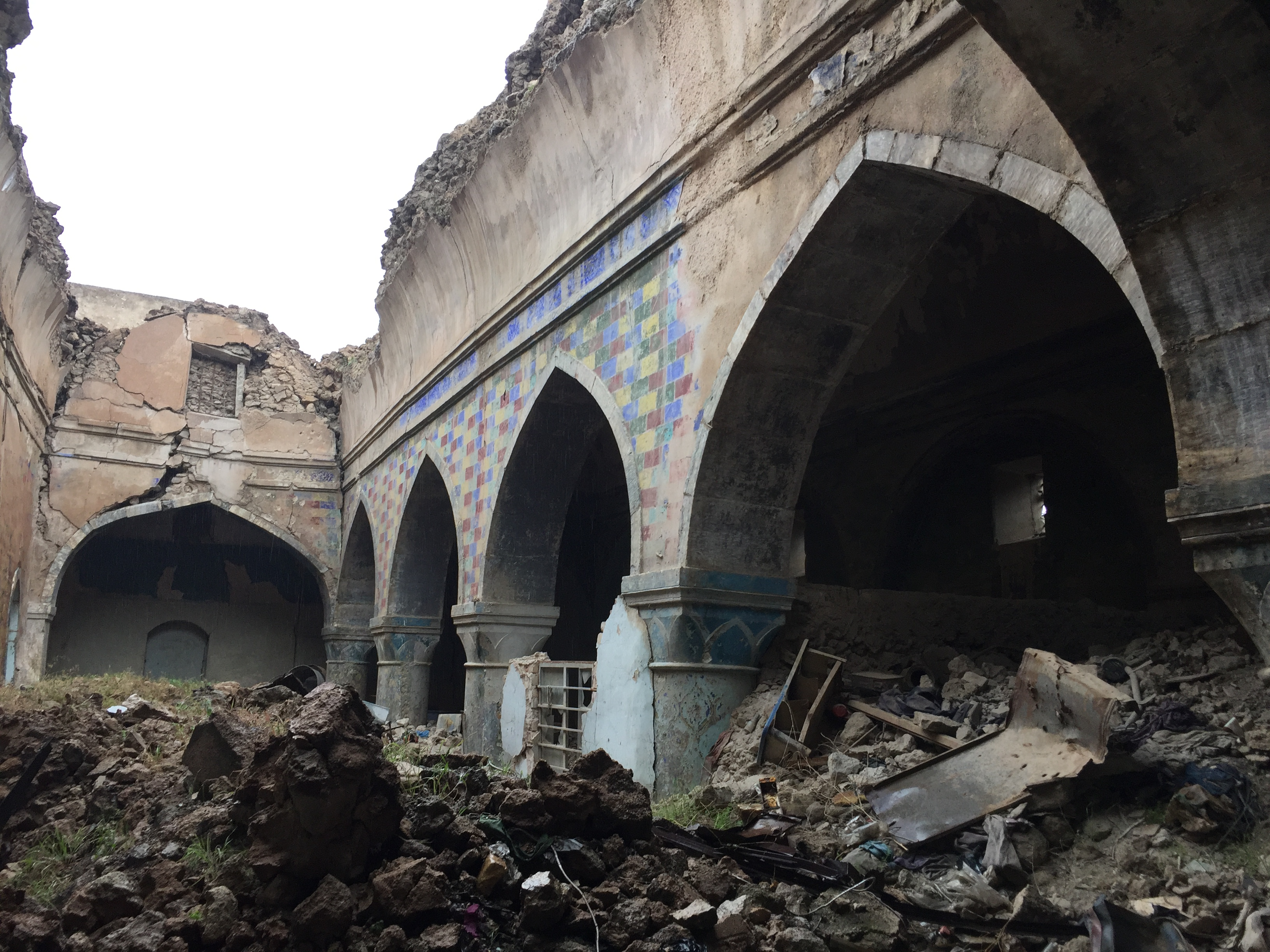
The ruins of the Sassoon Synagogue, 2018.

The Sassoon Synagogue is the last surviving synagogue in Mosul that belonged to the Sassoon family. The synagogue is noted for its rich architecture, which contains pointed arches, colorful brickwork, and azure blue inscription. The synagogue was turned into an animal barn, then left in ruins following the Fall of Mosul in 2014 to ISIS. Funds were given to rebuild the synagogue, but were frozen in 2023 due to a stalemate with Israel.

=== Tomb of Jonah ===
According to Jewish tradition, the tomb of the Abrahamic prophet Jonah was located on top of an archeological mountain that also housed a mosque called the Nabi Yunus Mosque. Before Mosul's expansion, the site was located around a small village called "Nabi Yunus" and was located between Mosul and the ruins of Nineveh. Although the site is also considered Jewish, it is mostly associated and visited by Muslims.

== Sites in Amadiyya ==
Although the population of Amadiyya contains mostly Kurdish Muslims, before the Iraq War, a third of the population was composed of Christians and Jews. The city had two synagogues that belonged to the Jews. One of them is the Knis Navi Yehezqel Synagogue, which features a shrine attached to it dedicated to an unidentified Judaic prophet named Hazana. Ever since the creation of the State of Israel in 1948, most of the Jews of the city became part of the exodus.

=== Tomb of Hazana ===
There is an underground Abrahamic tomb dedicated to an obscure figure whose identity is disputed even by locals. The popular tradition among all the faiths in the city is that it is an obscure prophet known as Hazana, described by locals as a son of David or a grandson of Joseph or simply as a forgotten figure, and who is associated with purity and fertility.

== Other sites in Northern Iraq ==
=== Alqosh ===
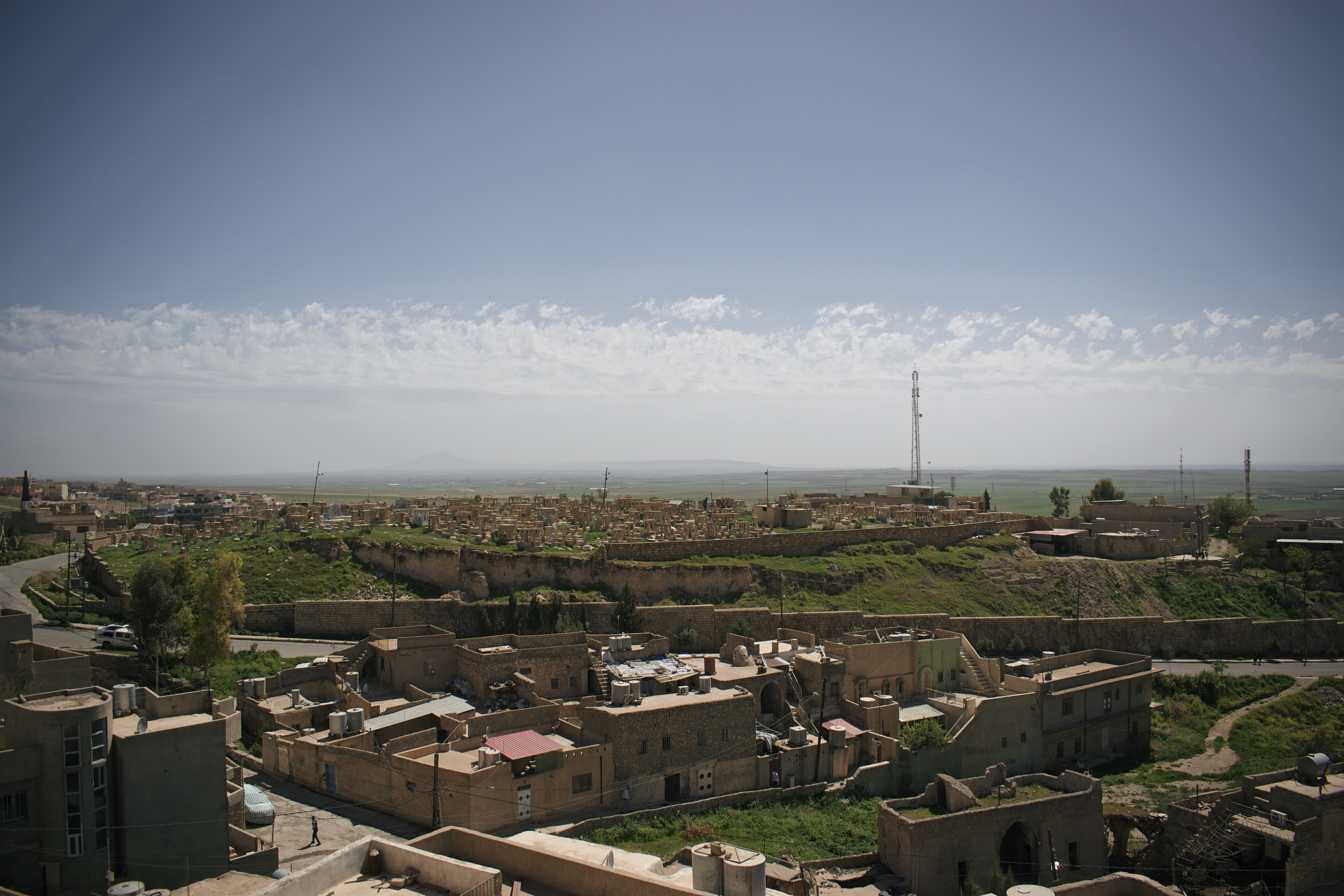
A view of Alqosh in 2018.

Alqosh is a town located on the Nineveh Plains inhabited by both Chaldean Christians and Jews. The town was important to Jews due to being the location of the tomb of the Abrahamic prophet Nahum. A synagogue is also located next to the tomb, where Jewish festivals were held. A large number of Jews also made a pilgrimage to Alqosh due to its sacred position, coming from other towns or from as far as Israel. A Jewish cemetery also existed in the town. Currently, the town is under the control of the regional Kurdistan government.

==== Tomb of Nahum ====
The tomb of Nahum is located next to the synagogue. It is recognized as sacred by all three Abrahamic religions in Iraq. The tomb underwent basic repairs in 1796. When all Jews were forced to flee Alqosh in 1948, the iron keys to the tomb were handed to an Assyrian man, Sami Jajouhana. Few Jews visit the historic site, yet Jajouhana continues to keep the promise he made with his Jewish friends, and looks after the tomb. Nahum being from Alqosh is briefly mentioned in the first part of the Book of Nahum.

=== Tomb of Daniel ===
In the Kirkuk Citadel in the city of Kirkuk, there is a shrine dedicated to the Abrahamic prophet Daniel, who was the prophet of Babylon during the era of King Nebuchadnezzar II. The tomb allegedly contains the tomb of Daniel, as well as the tombs of two of his companions, Azariah and Hananiah. The tombs are topped by two blue domes and a minaret that originated from the end of the era of the Mongol Empire. The site used to be a synagogue, but it was converted into a church, and then eventually into a mosque. The first cemetery in Kirkuk is situated adjacent to the shrine. It contains the tombs of people who respected Daniel and aspired to be buried next to him. The shrine is one of several sites throughout the Middle East where it is claimed Daniel is buried, including the Tomb of Daniel in Iran.

== See also ==
- Bataween– former Jewish quarter in Baghdad
- Baghdadi Jews– Jews of Iraqi origin who are now resident in India
- History of the Jews in Iraq
- Operation Ezra and Nehemiah
- Nehardea– Late Mesopotamian city inhabited by Jews
- Religion in Iraq
- Sassoon family– Iraqi Jewish family that funded construction in Iraq
- Shorja– former Jewish quarter in Baghdad
