= Tomb of Isaac Gaon =

Tomb of a Rabbi in Baghdad, Iraq

- ضريح إسحاق الغاوون

Religion
- Affiliation: Judaism

Location
- Location: Qanbar Ali in Baghdad, Iraq

The Tomb of Isaac Gaon (Hebrew: קבר יצחק גאון, Arabic: ضريح إسحاق الغاوون) is a historic medieval Jewish mausoleum and the location of a former synagogue located in the Qanbar Ali neighborhood of Baghdad, Iraq.

== Historical background ==
A local tradition identified Isaac Gaon was a 6th-century banker for Ali ibn Abi Talib, while historical sources identifies Gaon as a 10th-century Jewish Rabbi who was likely a part of the Geonim period of Jewish history, which took place in the Abbasid Caliphate. The tomb was also once connected to a synagogue named after Isaac Gaon. As well as a market named Souk Hanun in Qanbar Ali, which used to be frequented by Iraqi Jewish merchants.

The only historical traveler to document the tomb's existence was 19th-century visitor J. J. Benjamin, who mentioned that at the time it was a large building that stood on columns but was only 2 metres (6 ft 7 in) in height with carved inscriptions. It had a synagogue known as the "Beth Haknezeth Sheik (Isaac) Gaon" that contained a room where the tomb of the "High Priest" was kept. He also noted the activities taking place in it such as Rabbis reciting prayers and reading the Book of Esther beside it.

The complex, alongside the tomb, was abandoned following the mass migration of Iraqi Jewish after the establishment of the state of Israel. Following the 2003 US invasion of Iraq, the mausoleum was looted, resulting in the loss of its original content. Due to prolonged neglect, the building became infested with bugs, snakes, and scorpions, posing a health hazard to nearby residents, after which the site was sealed.

=== Restoration ===
In 2025, the tomb's building was restored to a mausoleum. The site had been ignored by the Iraqi government due to ownership disputes and its religious affiliation. The restoration was done by Khalida Eliyahu, the current leader of the remaining Jewish community in Baghdad, after getting approval from the state. The revival was done in hopes by the locals of being part of reviving old Iraqi heritage and to turn it into a tourist attraction. Although the restoration was praised, fears of political and radical social condemnation were also noted, based on fears that the restoration would be misinterpreted as being related to Israel or any Western entity. The restoration project included the removal of large amounts of trash that had been dumped inside. A school and synagogue had been at the site, which over time had been reduced to the location of the tomb of Rabbi Isaac, which had been long-venerated as a place of prayer and healing.

== See also ==
- History of the Jews in Iraq
- List of Jewish sites in Iraq
- Tomb of Joshua the High Priest, another Jewish tomb in Baghdad.
- Tomb of Ezra, the burial site of Ezra in Southern Iraq.
- Tomb of Ezekiel, a shrine attributed to Ezekiel in Babylon.
- Great Synagogue of Baghdad
