= Tomb of Joshua the High Priest =

Historical and Judaic tomb in Baghdad, Iraq

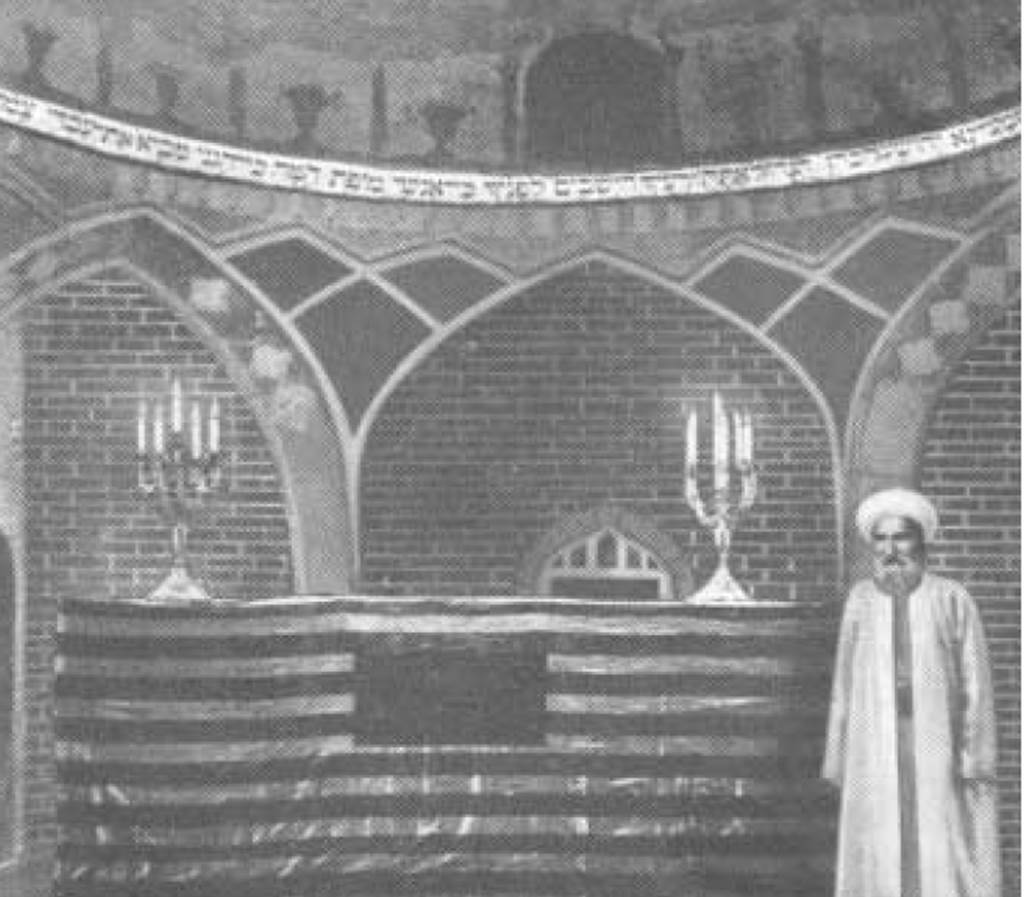
- Ezra Dangoor, Chief Rabbi of Baghdad from 1923 to 1926, standing next to the tomb.
- Type: Maqam
- Cultures: Christianity; Judaism; Islam
- Location: Sheikh Ma'ruf Cemetery in Baghdad, Iraq

Site notes
- Condition: Preserved

The Tomb of Joshua the High Priest (Hebrew: קבר יהושע הכהן הגדול, Arabic: مرقد يوشع كوهين كاوول) is a site that traditionally houses the burial site of Joshua the High Priest. The shrine is located on the Karkh side of Baghdad, Iraq, and has been a historically important site for the Baghdadi Jewish population as well as Muslims, who recognize Joshua the High Priest as a prophet sent by God to the Israelites. Although the city's Jewish population has since left Baghdad, the shrine is still preserved and visited by locals. The burial site is also mistaken by some to be the tomb of the Abrahamic prophet Joshua ben Nun.

== Background ==
Joshua, unrelated to the Abrahamic prophet, was mentioned in several books of the Hebrew Bible, such as the Book of Zechariah and the Book of Ezra, as the first High Priest during the reconstruction of the Jewish Temple after the return of the Jews from the Babylonian Captivity. He was among the leaders instrumental in inspiring in a momentum towards the reconstruction of the temple after its destruction. Another figure instrumental in the return of Jews was Ezra, whose tomb is also located in Iraq.

== History ==
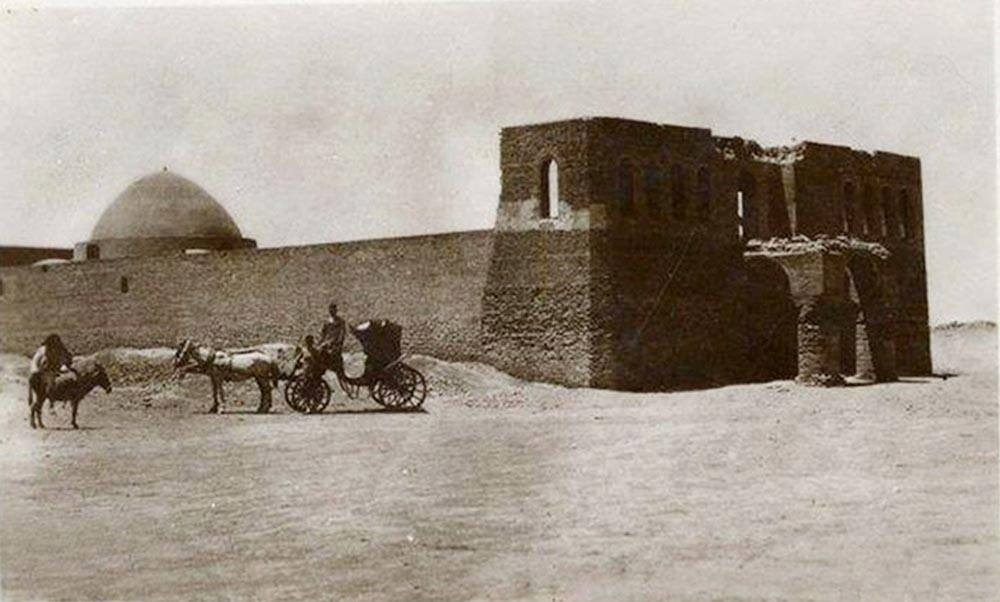
The tomb of Joshua the High Priest in 1923.

The site was first established in the 6th century BCE by Iraqi Jews and has since evolved into a significant religious building. It's located in the Sheikh Ma'ruf Cemetery near the Abbasid Zumurrud Khatun Mausoleum in al-Karkh which in Abbasid time was called Bab al-Basra. It had historically been respected by both Arabs and Jews. This historical site is an example of the historical continuity of Jewish Iraqis as well as co-existence between Iraqi communities. It was also a pilgrimage site for Jews where Shavuot is celebrated. One of the earliest mentions of the tomb comes from a Turkish traveler named Sayyid Ali, who mentioned visiting it in 1554 in his book Marat al-Mamalik. He mentions that inside a small building is the tomb of a Jewish priest respected by both Iraqi Jews and Muslims. On top of the tomb was a metal tablet on which Joshua's name is inscribed in Hebrew.

This account is further expanded by 17th-century Portuguese traveler Pedro Teixeira in his The Travels of Pedro Teixeira. He confirmed that the modern mausoleum was constructed by Muslim Arabs due to the importance of the figure buried in it. The account says:

Without the Mesopotamian quarter of the city there is, in a small building, a tomb held in great reverence by Moors and Jews, wherein, they say, rests the body of a Jewish high priest. It is like a great chest of masonry, and in the head of it is a copper plate, with Hebrew characters in relief, as follows: "Yehsuah Koengadoh;" that is: "Iosuah the High Priest." They say that he was a holy saint, and all reverence him accordingly, by reason of the miracles that they say God wrought by his means.

— Pedro Teixeira, The Journeys of Pedro Teixeira, p. 68

The London Jewish Expositor reported on 20 April 1825 that it was one hour away from proper Baghdad, and witnessed Jewish gatherings that sang songs and chanted prayers dedicated to Joshua the High Priest. Around the shrine are also tombs dedicated to several Baghdadi Jewish notables such as hakham Abdallah Somekh, and Jacob ben Joseph Harofe.

During World War II, after the government of Rashid Ali al-Gilani was expelled, some Iraqi officers loyal to al-Gilani began riots on 1 June 1941 on a road that led to the shrine. The riots targeted the Jews who were on their way to celebrate Shavuot. Some sources claim that those riots would eventually lead to the events of the Farhud. Although the attack, which some sources report was on young Jews attending Shavuot in the shrine, was unrelated. In the 21st century, the shrine underwent preservation efforts, but most of the Jewish texts have since been removed.

Although the site is largely agreed to be the tomb of Joshua the High Priest, it is also mistaken to be the tomb of Joshua ben Nun. 11th-century Muslim scholar al-Khatib al-Baghdadi mistakenly refers to it as the tomb of the Prophet in one of his History of Baghdad volumes. The New York Times published in an article from 20 February 2021 that showed that locals have also rebranded the shrine as belonging to the prophet Joshua since the disappearance of the Iraqi Jewish population.

== See also ==
- History of the Jews in Iraq
- List of Jewish sites in Iraq
- Tomb of Isaac Gaon, another Jewish shrine in Baghdad.
- Tomb of Ezra, the burial site of Ezra in Southern Iraq.
- Tomb of Ezekiel, a shrine attributed to Ezekiel in Babylon.
- Great Synagogue of Baghdad
