= Meir Taweig Synagogue =

Former Synagogue in Baghdad, Iraq

- Arabic: كنيس مئير طويج
- Location of the former synagogue in Baghdad

Religion
- Affiliation: Judaism (former)
- Rite: Nusach Sefard; Edot Hamizrach
- Ecclesiastical or organizational status: Synagogue (1942–2003)
- Leadership: Rabbi Emad Levy
- Status: Abandoned

Location
- Location: Bataween, Baghdad
- Country: Iraq
- Interactive map of Meir Taweig Synagogue
- Administration: Ministry of Endowment (1968–2003); Mousawi Sect (since 2003)
- Coordinates: 33°19′21″N 44°25′01″E

Architecture
- Type: Synagogue architecture
- Founder: Meir Taweig
- Funded by: Saddam Hussein (1985)
- Completed: 1942; 1985 (restored)

Meir Taweig Synagogue (Arabic: كنيس مئير طويج), also known as Meir Tweg Synagogue or Me'ir Avraham Taweq Synagogue, is a large synagogue, located in the historic Jewish quarter of Bataween, in Baghdad, Iraq. The complex comprises the main synagogue, a Jewish school, library, and community center.

Established in 1942, it was one of the important synagogues in the city. The synagogue was impacted during the persecution of the Jews in Iraq and was also damaged during frequent occasions of unrest and wars. It was restored in 1985 by Saddam Hussein. The synagogue was further expanded in 1988. After the 2003 invasion of Iraq, the synagogue was in fear of getting targeted in the attacks. Today, a small group of Jews, accompanied by Muslims looks after the synagogue.

== History ==
=== Early history ===
Meir Taweig Synagogue was built between 1942 and 1946. It is named after Meir Taweig, a Jewish businessman of Baghdad. During those times Iraq had a thriving Jewish community of 150,000 people, with majority of them living in Baghdad. It served as key place for worshiping of Jews of Baghdad. The synagogue is located in Bataween district, which was once the main Jewish quarter of Baghdad. Formed in the early 1930s, it was inhabited later after the events of Farhud in 1941.

Named after Iraqi businessman Meir Taweig, the synagogue was built in 1942. Persecution of the Jews during the Farhud increased their fear in the area. This synagogue was one of the centers for registering Iraqi Jews who wanted to emigrate to Israel. In 1950, the Iraqi government issued a law revoking their citizenship and allowing Iraqi Jews to emigrate to Israel via Cyprus.

In 1984, the synagogue was raided by the Iraqi secret police. It was restored by the government in 1985.

=== Ba'athist period: 1968–2003 ===
The persecution of the Jews decreased in Iraq, after the Ba'ath Party came to power. However, due to the anti-Zionist ideologies of the government, tensions remained high. During events such as 1969 Baghdad hangings and anti-Zionist demonstrations, the synagogue was affected. By the 1970s, gradually the government began protecting the Jews. The international community also pressured the Iraqi government to preserve remaining community.

A department within the Ministry of National Security was set up to ensure their safety and preservation of Jewish sites. In 1984, the secret police forces raided the synagogue and confiscated Jewish Archives. The damaged synagogue was restored by the government. Saddam Hussein paid for the restoration works. The synagogue and the surrounding neighborhoods remained home to the rest of Iraqi Jews. The synagogue also contains a school, library and community office.

An incident took place in 1998, on the day of the Jewish festival of Sukkot, when a Palestinian man opened fire, killing four people, including two Jews, at the Baghdad synagogue. Following the arrest of the perpetrator, the government pledged to ensure prompt justice. As a precautionary measure, police guards were stationed at the synagogue, and the cabinet released a statement denouncing the shooting incident. The cabinet emphasized that the Jewish community in Iraq are Iraqis that should not be associated with Zionist activities aimed at disrupting the political, economic, social, and health security of Arab countries. Saddam himself also condemned the attack. Later the Palestinian man faced trial in the court.

=== Current: 2003–present ===
The synagogue was closed in 2003, when the United States launched invasion on Iraq. The remaining Jews were scared of the future, when Saddam was overthrown after the fall of Baghdad in April 2003. Throughout the Iraq War, the synagogue remained closed. Since 2003, the new Iraqi authorities have repeatedly promised to preserve and maintain the synagogue. There is also a sect of Jews called the Mousawi sect near Al-Nahr Street next to Al-Mustansiriya University, and this is also still working until now, and this is concerned with collecting real estate and money from Jews in Baghdad.

== Location ==
The synagogue is located in Al–Bataween neighborhood in eastern Baghdad. The complex is situate between Al-Saadoun Street and Al-Nidal Street, close to Firdos Square, near the riverbank of Tigris. Al-Bataween has been the only neighborhood in Baghdad which is home to remaining Jews, living alongside Muslims and Christians. Al-Habibiya Jewish Cemetery is also located nearby, between Shia Muslim neighborhood of Sadr City and Al-Shaheed Monument. According to a report by The National News, several buildings can be restored as heritage houses to be used for cultural and business activities.

== Features ==
The Meir Taweg Synagogue also consists of a Jewish school, library and community center. It has been redecorated and carpeted with air-conditioning equipment installed. The central chamber contain the ark and bimah. A Jewish school is also part of the synagogue. At the top of the main facade of the hall, there is a wooden tablet of the Ten Commandments, above which is the name of God. Surrounding it are marble panels on which are engraved seven-branched candlesticks and Psalms in Hebrew, and in the middle is a luxurious cabinet containing ancient Torah manuscripts made of gazelle skin.

There is also a large library in the synagogue, which used to have Iraqi Jewish Archive. The library consists of approximately one million books. In 1984, the secret police raided the synagogue and confiscated Iraqi Jewish Archives from the synagogue. During the battle of Baghdad in 2003, the coalition forces bombed the intelligence headquarters of Saddam Hussein. They discovered the bulk of Iraqi Jewish Archives in the building's basement, which were confiscated from the synagogue.

== See also ==
- Al-Habibiyah Jewish Cemetery
- Baghdadi Jews
- History of the Jews in Baghdad
- History of the Jews in Iraq
- List of synagogues in Iraq
- List of Jewish sites in Iraq
