= Bataween =

Main Jewish quarter of Baghdad, Iraq

Al-Bataween البتاوين
- Neighborhood
- Etymology: Named after the Batawi tribe
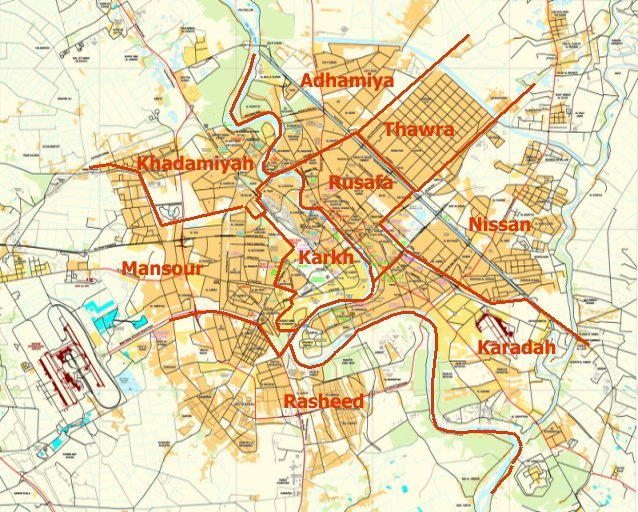
- Location of Al-Bataween in Baghdad
- Interactive map of Al-Bataween
- Location in Baghdad, Iraq
- Coordinates: 33.3201°N 44.4205°E
- Country: Iraq
- Governorate: Baghdad Governorate
- City: Baghdad
- Established: Early 20th century

Government
  - Type: Local Administration
- Time zone: UTC+3 (Arabian Standard Time)

Al-Bataween (Arabic: البتاوين) is a neighborhood in Baghdad, Iraq. It is located in the eastern region of Baghdad, on the riverside of the Tigris and is part of Karrada district. Prior to the 2003 invasion of Iraq, it was the main Jewish quarter of Baghdad. Today, the neighborhood is inhabited by Muslims, Christians and a few Jews.

Originally built in the 1930s by Iraqi Jews and Armenian Christians, it was one of the most affluent neighborhoods and was home to numerous synagogues, churches, schools, yeshivas and clubs. After the majority of Jews fled persecution in Iraq, the area became inhabited by Muslim families and later by Egyptians and Sudanese. Until 2003, most remaining Iraqi Jews lived in Bataween. However, the war prompted many of the Jews to leave, many to Israel. As a result of the spillover from the civil war in Syria, many Syrian families have settled in Bataween.

== History ==
=== Etymology ===
The name of the Bataween neighborhood came from the word "al-Bata", which is a village in the city of Hillah. Some of its people left it to settle in Baghdad in the orchards of this area, such as the (Mamo) orchard and the lettuce orchard.

=== Jewish and Christian quarter ===
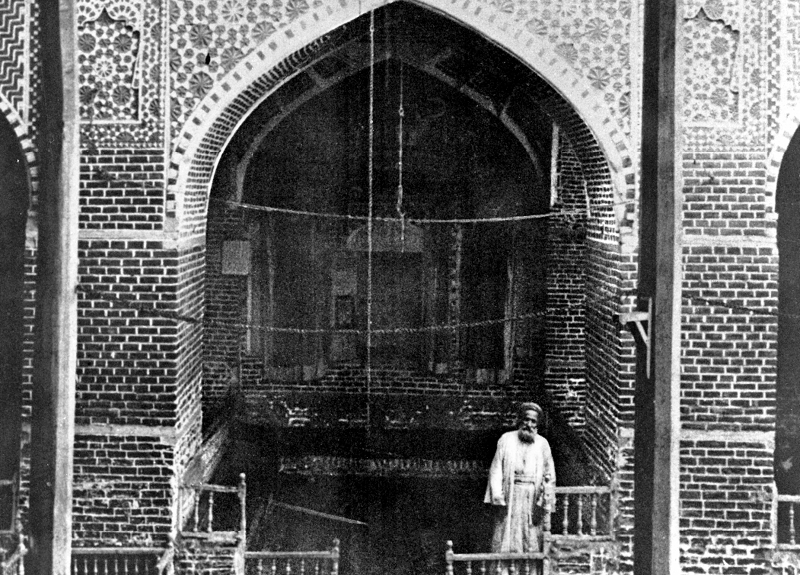
Hakham Ezra Dangoor (b.1848)— Chief Rabbi of Baghdad (1923-1926) in the New Synagogue of Baghdad

Many of the residents of this neighborhood were Iraqi Jews who lived alongside Armenian Christians, many of whom had immigrated to Iraq after the Armenian Genocide in 1917, as well as before it, in the late 19th and early 20th centuries. They also lived with other Christian communities, such as the Chaldeans, particularly the poorer classes among them in more recent decades, as well as Arab and Kurdish Muslims. Most of the houses in the neighborhood were built in the mid-1930s. Jews lived in harmony and accord with Muslims during that time. Among the Jewish families who lived in this neighborhood were: the house of Yousef Abu Sami (Shamuel), Nissim Hezekiel, the house of Khadouri Mirlawi, Saleh Salsoun, the house of Shasha and Salim Manshi, Karaji Daoud and others. They practiced their religious rituals with complete freedom and had several synagogues, namely the Shamash Synagogue and Masouda Shamtob Synagogue, in addition to Meir Tuwaiq Synagogue, which is close to the Bataween souk.

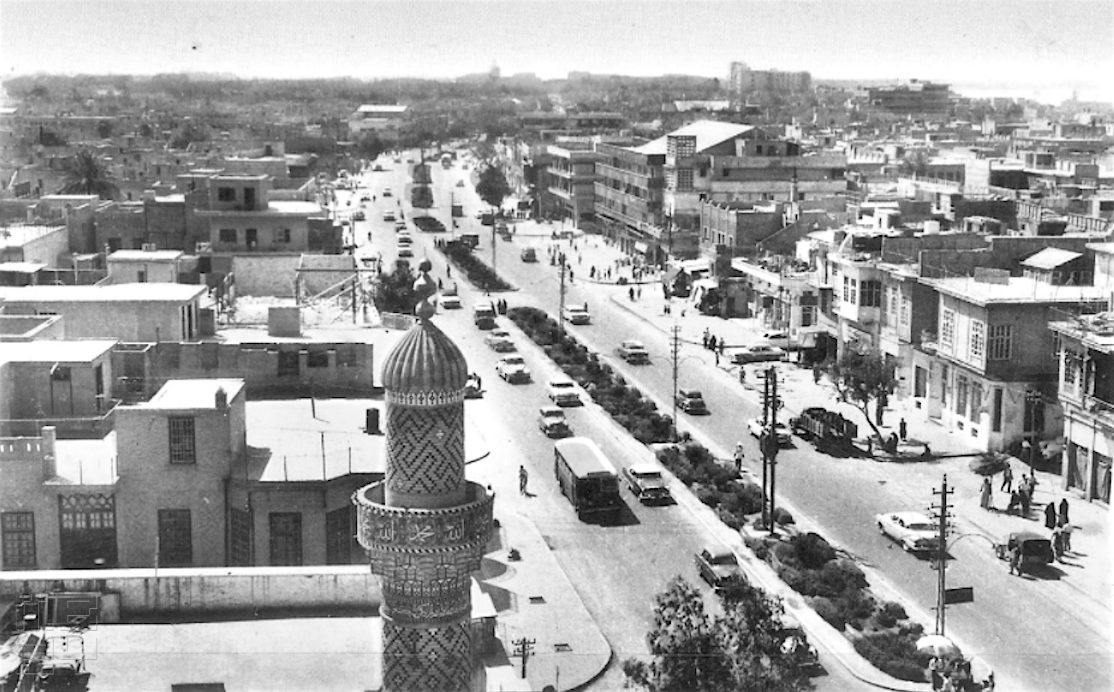
Al-Sa'doun Street in Bataweein n the 1950s

According to some accounts, construction in the Bataween area began after World War II when people started to move into the area, following the displacement caused by the 1941 Farhud massacre. At that time, Jews primarily resided in the Abu Saifin area. Bataween was originally farmland, planted with crops like lettuce, and the Jewish community sought refuge there after fleeing the violence. They moved to the area, known as Karrada Maryam, on the Karkh side of Baghdad, escaping the killings and finding protection from local farmers. In the early fifties of the last century, after the migration of Jews from Iraq, the Bataween neighborhood lost many of the Baghdad Jewish families. Tunis Street, near the White Palace, was relatively populated by Jewish families such as the Gitayat Salman, Sami and Meir brothers, in addition to the Qattan family, the lawyer Yaqoub Abdul Aziz, the Lawy and Bikhour families, and others.

A local man named Abdul Ali, who lived in the nearby Sobna (or Karrada Maryam) area, helped in protecting the Jewish refugees. The land in this area was government property, but it was not sold for money. Instead, it was based on an acquisition system, where individuals could claim land by cultivating it. The price, if any, was minimal—just a few dirhams. The farmers who lived in Bataween, attracted by its proximity to the Tigris River, built homes for themselves using clay. As Jews arrived, they too settled in the area and began constructing homes. Years later, under the guardianship of Abdul-Ilah, a perforated brick factory (known as al-Muzraf) was imported, and the Jewish community was again at the forefront, establishing the first brick factories in the region. This neighborhood was also adorned with Christian churches and synagogues for the Armenians and one for the Jacobites in Tunis Street and others. The most beautiful thing that characterized this neighborhood was the good neighborliness and coexistence between the three religions. Over time, the neighborhood turned into a commercial and industrial area, where shops and printing presses multiplied after the migration of the Jews in the late sixties.

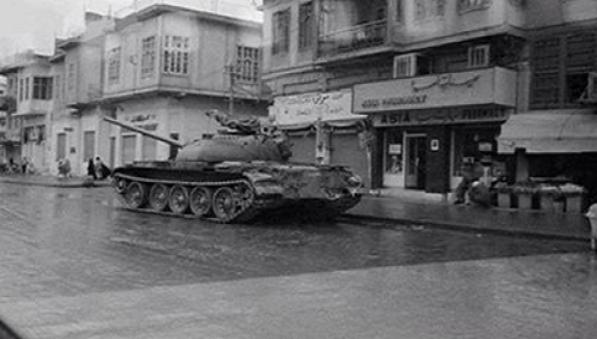
Bataween during the 1963 Iraqi coup d'etat

During the time of Abdul-Karim Qasim, the situation of the region's Jews improved. However, antisemitism increased during the rule of Abdul Rahman Arif, as the Arab states lost to Israel in the 1967 Six-Day War. The Jews were put under house arrests in the neighborhood and placed under tight surveillance.

The fortune of the neighborhood improved gradually, as President Saddam Hussein assumed more power. He made amendments to Jews in Iraq, most of whom lived in Baghdad's Bataween district. Meir Taweig Synagogue continued to function as Baghdad's only active synagogue. It was restored in 1988, with help of Saddam. He also stationed guards to protect Jews and security forces protected the synagogue. Frank Inny School in Bataween, the last Jewish school of Iraq, was nationalized in 1974. During the Iran–Iraq War (1980–1988), a large percentage of the Arab community, particularly Sudanese and Egyptians, moved here. The neighborhood began to decline during the Gulf War. The international community imposed sanctions on Iraq, resulting mass emigration of people living in the neighborhood, particularly Christians. Bataween was also targeted during both the wars.

== Present day (2003-present) ==
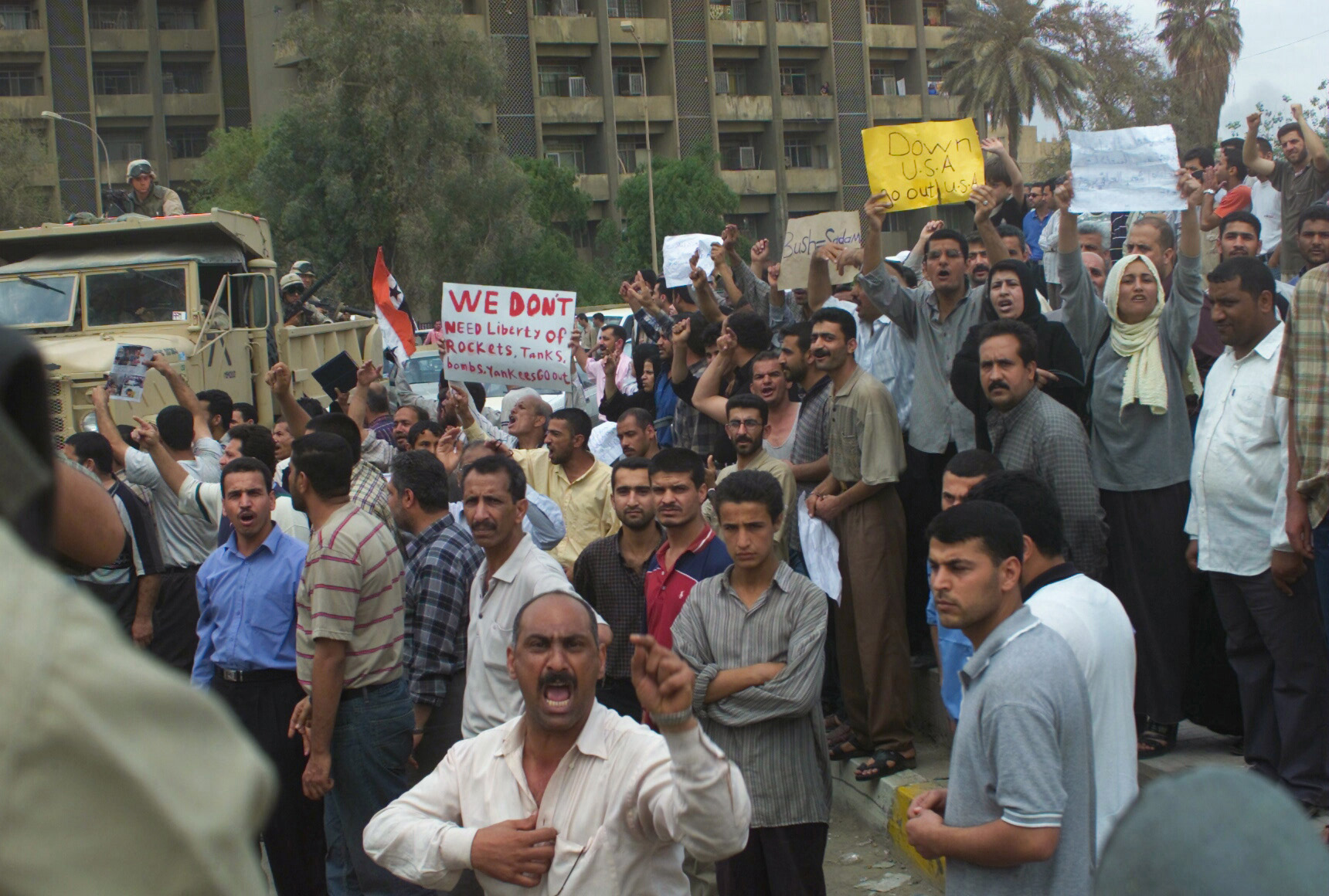
Protest against the coalition forces near Bataween

The synagogue was closed few weeks before the invasion of Iraq in 2003. Within weeks of occupation, the coalition forces took control of Baghdad. Firdos Square, located nearby, was the site were Saddam's statue was toppled, symbolizing end of his regime. Like rest of Baghdad, residents of Bataween were subjected of kidnapping, bombings, thefts and other crimes. The Jews living in the neighborhood were hidden and protected by their Muslim and Christian neighbors. Many of them also started leaving the country. The north of Bataween lies Bab al-Sharqi area, which became a stronghold for the Mahdi Army, during insurgency against the coalition forces and civil war between religious factions from 2006 to 2008. The second area is the closest to “Al-Firdos Square” and “Kahramana Square,” al-Hasnawi adds. Its inhabitants were a mixture of Iraqi Christians, Muslims, and Jews, but most of them left it voluntarily or by force in the middle of the twentieth century, and after 2003 for many reasons. Many Egyptians and Sudanese were killed in the sectarian war between 2006 and 2008. Bataween was affected throughout the Iraq War. On 26 September 2009, around 6:30 A.M, Hafez Sadkhan Lefta, owner of Al Na'eim Hotel was murdered in the area. Those Christians who remained in the neighborhood were prevented from leaving due to their financial circumstances, although they face problems in renovating and repairing their homes due to legal restrictions on heritage buildings.

Following the territorial expansion of the Islamic State (IS) during the 2013–2017 civil war, Christians living in the area fled, fearful of future consequences. Many Syrians moved to the neighborhood, escaping from the civil war in Syria. Today only handful of Jews are left in Iraq, most of them in Baghdad, residing in Bataween. But according to the some sources, as of 2014, an estimated 160 Jews found living in Baghdad. The Jews of the neighborhood are now taken care by their Muslim neighbors. Later, after the security campaign was completed, the Ministry of Interior announced that it had “seized usurped properties and houses that were illegally seized in Bataween,” and called on the original owners of these properties to visit the al-Sa'doun Police Station, which is located within the neighborhood, and bring papers or supporting evidence, so that they can recover their usurped rights. It is believed that there is an undeclared political motive for the security operation in Bataween, which is “the greed of armed groups to dominate the area through investment and turning it into commercial centers. This practically undermines crime and rids Baghdad of its most complex neighborhoods, but it is also a major gateway to corruption and an important economic resource for armed militias.”

After 2003, the displacement and ethnic cleansing operations began, including the areas inhabited by Gypsies, so it is characterized by the large number of displaced Gypsy families. Al-Bataween has its history, as it starts from al-Urfaliyya to the end of Al-Zaim Abdul Karim Street. Most of the people inhabited there are from the poor classes, primarily Christians, as well as Muslims. There is a street in the middle called Tunis Street, next to which are aluminum and decor shops. Most of the residents of the Al-Urfaliyya area are Sudanese and Egyptian families who have settled since the 1980s. It contains grocery stores, liquor stores, a fruit market, a vegetable market, butcher shops, restaurants such as Abu Younan Restaurant, Tajran Restaurant, and others, as well as doctors' clinics of various specialties, in addition to pharmacies. There are a number of popular cafes in its alleys, and it is also distinguished by the large number of hotels of various classes. The Bataween area originated from an old neighborhood called Bustan al-Khas, which was then outside the borders of Baghdad, south of its eastern gate.

Today, Bataween is considered a controversial area due to some undesirable behaviors, such as the spread of sex trade, drugs, and organized crime. Bataween is still a source of danger and inconvenience to the owners of the surrounding shops, so you can often see police patrols and checkpoints in its streets and at the exit overlooking the vital al-Sa'doun Street. A security source told Baghdad Today Agency:

“Bataween is a source of many practices, especially drug trade, as the security forces have an important database, in addition to intelligence sources that provide them with every movement that violates and breaches the law. There are very large mafias in Bataween, as the traders have agents who headquarter in “Al-Ummah Park” in Bab Al-Sharqi, through which they bring customers who want to take drugs or have sex with girls and boys of different ages, even under the age of puberty."

He continued, "The security forces, through their intelligence sources, carry out operations to arrest some of the accused, both male and female, from time to time." Last Friday, the Iraqi Intelligence Agency announced the arrest of an African drug dealer in possession of 5 kg of crystal meth in Baghdad.

== Notable landmarks ==
=== Places of worship ===
- Meir Taweig Synagogue is a large Jewish congregation and synagogue. The complex also consists of a Jewish school and a library. It was built in 1942, named after Meir Taweig, an Iraqi Jewish businessman. When the Jews were leaving the country, the synagogue served as registration center. It was restored and expanded under the regime of Saddam Hussein in 1988. The library of the synagogue contained more than one million books. In 1984, it was confiscated by the Secret Police. Later the Jews themselves agreed with the authorities to keep the Jewish Archive, where it was preserved in tight security.
- St. Gregory Armenian Church is an Orthodox Church, located on al-Tayeran Square, between Bab al-Sharqi and Bataween. It one of the churches of the Armenian community in Iraq. The church was named after Gregory the Illuminator. Its construction began in 1954 and was opened in 1957, with contribution from Armenian philanthropist Calouste Gulbenkian. Based on the Armenian architecture, the church complex is a sturdy building built with white reinforced concrete. Despite the attacks on churches in Iraq, after the downfall of Saddam, this church remained untouched by the attacks.
- Mas'udah Shamtoub synagogue
- Shamash Synagogue

=== Other landmarks ===
- The Administrative Committee for Iraqi Jews is the umbrella organization for Jews in Iraq. Its headquarters are located in a shabby office building in the synagogue compound. Later it was shifted to near to Al-Mustansiriya University on Al-Rashid Street. Until the 2003 invasion of Iraq, it was attached to the Ministry of Endowments.
- Baghdad Jewish Club was the main Jewish club of Baghdad, which was once the main center of social and cultural activities for the Jews of Baghdad. The club is located in the main the street of the neighborhood.
- Sha'shou Palace is a popular palace. Interestingly, houses in Baghdad were typically made from palm trunks and wood, with mats (known as al-Bawari, the plural of Bariya) and dirt placed on top for roofing. It was not until the 1930s, in places like Sha'shou Palace, that brick houses began to appear. The Jewish community was among the first to use bricks for construction. When they came to Bataween after the Farhud, they introduced brick construction, following the traditional style of old Baghdad homes. Bataween became the first neighborhood to be built with bricks, after Sha'shou Palace. This palace, owned by a Jewish man named Eliyahu Sha'shou, was located on the banks of the Tigris River, halfway between Baghdad and Al-A'dhamiyah. In 1920, King Faisal I of Iraq even rented the palace for his private residence.

== Notable people ==
- Shamuel
- Naseem Hesqil
- Kadoori Merlawi
- Salih Selson
- Salim Manshi
- Ghareeem families
- Sassoon Eskell
- Mir Basri
- Anwar Shaul
- Rabbi Sassoon Khadouri
- Salima Pasha.

== See also ==
- Bab Al-Sharqi
- Shorja
- Al-Habibiyah Jewish Cemetery
- History of the Jews in Baghdad
