= Qanbar Ali, Baghdad =

Old neighborhood in Baghdad, Iraq

Qanbar Ali قنبر علي
- Neighborhood
- Located in: Baghdad, Iraq
- Known for: Former Iraqi Jewish neighborhood; Tomb of Isaac Gaon
- Founder: Abbasid Caliphate
- Named for: Abbasid chamberlain nicknamed "Qanbar Ali"
- Time zone: UTC+3 (Arabian Standard Time)

Qanbar Ali (Arabic: قنبر علي), also known as al-Tawrat neighborhood (Arabic: محلة التوراة, also spelled as Arabic: محلة التورات), is an old neighborhood located in Baghdad, Iraq, located next to Souk al-Ghazal. The neighborhood dates back to the Abbasid period and is well-known for being a former Jewish neighborhood.

== Historical background ==
=== Origin of the name ===
The name "Qanbar Ali" is of uncertain origin. It is attributed to a man buried in a mosque in the quarter. The most plausible explanation is that it was the laqab of Abu Talib Nasir, nicknamed Qanbar bin Ali al-Naqib, who was the chamberlain of Abbasid Caliph al-Mustadi (r. 1170 – 1180), who was mentioned by the contemporary Ibn al-Jawzi in volume 10 of his al-Muntazam book. Abu Talib Nasir was then buried in the quarter, then named Bab 'Abraz (Arabic: باب أبرز).

The quarter was also known by several other names. The most prominent was al-Tawrah neighborhood, named after the Torah in reference to the Geonim and the Iraqi Jewish presence in the neighborhood. By the 20th century, al-Tawrah was considered separate from Qanbar Ali due to the Jewish presence. Some researchers, mentioned by Imad Abd al-Salam Rauf, believe that the quarter was originally known as al-Tajiyya (Arabic: التاجية) in reference to Seljuk vizier Taj al-Mulk. Other former names for the quarter were Qarah ibn Razin (Arabic: قراح ابن رزين), and, during the Ottoman period, Albu Shibl (Arabic: ألبو شبل).

=== Modern period ===
After the collapse of the Ottoman Empire, the sizable Jewish population continued to live in the quarter well into the Hashemite period until the 1940s. Many Jews prayed and engaged in commerce in the area and even expanded to al-Shorja. The Tomb of Isaac Gaon, a Jewish religious shrine in Qanbar Ali, was also looted and abandoned. Although the Jewish population has since left, the quarter is still considered a Jewish quarter traditionally and the name of al-Tawrat still exists on signs. The historic buildings of al-Tawrat have deteriorated after decades of neglect. The area is notable for its traditional Iraqi architecture and rich heritage. In 2025, restoration work was carried out at the Tomb of Isaac Gaon as part of efforts to preserve the area's Jewish heritage.

== Notable landmarks ==
=== Tomb of Isaac Gaon ===
The Tomb of Isaac Gaon (Hebrew: מקדש יצחק גאון, Arabic: ضريح إسحاق الغاوون) is a Jewish mausoleum and a former synagogue located in the quarter next to Souk Hanun, a marketplace in the quarter that used to be frequented by Iraqi Jewish merchants. Isaac Gaon was a 10th-century Jewish rabbi who was likely associated with the Geonim, Jewish religious scholars who thrived during the Abbasid Caliphate.

=== Qanbar Ali Mosque ===
The Qanbar Ali Mosque (Arabic: جامع قنبر علي) is the namesake of the quarter and also contains the tomb of Qanbar Ali. The original purpose of the mosque was a shrine as there was a cemetery located next to it originally. The oldest historical mention of the mosque dates back to 874 AH (1469 CE). When it fell into ruin during the Mamluk period, Ottoman viceroy Sulayman Pasha the Great restored it. Currently, the site was repurposed, and is believed by local Shi'i Muslims, as the shrine of the companion of Ali, who was also named Qanbar. However, there's no historical evidence that supports this belief.
