= Great Synagogue of Baghdad =

Ancient building in present-day Baghdad, Iraq

- Arabic: كنيس بغداد العظيم
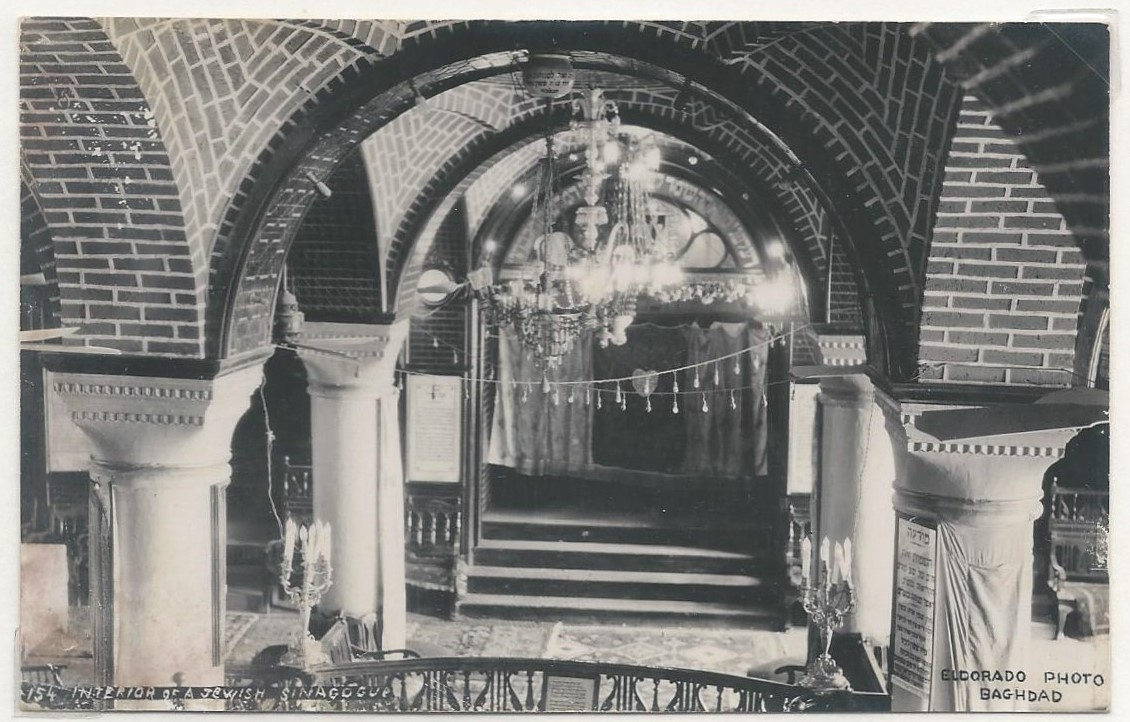
- The Great Synagogue, undated

- Location within Baghdad

Religion
- Affiliation: Judaism (former)
- Rite: Nusach Sefard; Edot Hamizrach
- Ecclesiastical or organisational status: Synagogue; Jewish museum
- Status: Closed (as a synagogue); Repurposed

Location
- Location: Baghdad
- Country: Iraq
- Coordinates: 33°20′28.68″N 44°23′47.04″E

Architecture
- Type: Synagogue architecture
- Style: Mesopotamian
- Established: 597 BCE (as a congregation)

The Great Synagogue of Baghdad (Arabic: كنيس بغداد العظيم, romanized: Kanīs Baghdād al-ʻAẓīm), also known as the Shaf ve’Yativ Synagogue or Shad veYativ Synagogue (Note: Roughly translated as “the Divine Presence was removed and settled in this place”.) is a former synagogue, located in Baghdad, Iraq. Rebuilt several times, the building now serves as a Jewish museum.

The building is traditionally believed to stand on the site of an ancient synagogue built by King Jeconiah, who was exiled from the Land of Israel to Babylon in 597 BCE. It is said that material gathered from the ruins of the Temple in Jerusalem was used in its construction. The ancient synagogue is reputed to accommodate approximately 20,000 worshippers, while the current former synagogue and museum building is one eighth in size of the original building.

== History ==
=== Early history ===
King Jehoiachin, along with many other Jews, was exiled to the city of Nehardea in Babylon, which corresponds to modern-day Baghdad. This city was strategically located at the confluence of the Euphrates and Malka rivers. The Jewish community in Nehardea established the first Jewish settlement there, continuing to send offerings to the First Temple in Jerusalem, which were transported from Babylon. Nehardea became the capital for the Babylonian exilarch, and there is evidence suggesting that the first exilarch hailed from this community. Additionally, the Nehardean community founded an academy that became one of the most significant centers of Jewish learning in the Middle East by the early third century CE. It is believed that parts of the Babylonian Talmud were composed at this academy. However, the academy was destroyed in 259 CE, and its operations moved to Pumbedita.

When the Jews were exiled to Babylon, the Prophet Ezekiel's significant accomplishment was the construction of a synagogue. Ezekiel buried half of the soil he had collected in the bag that the defeated King Jehoiachin carried with him to Babylon for his eventual burial. This soil was placed in the synagogue's foundation.

This synagogue is considered the first of its kind in history, and Ezekiel referred to it as Kehila Kedousha, which means "Holy Community." It became a central place for uniting the exiled Jewish community. Jews worshipped there under the rule of the Babylonians, Persians, and Greeks, continuing even after Alexander the Great's conquest of Persia.

After the Persians took control of Babylon from the Greeks following Alexander's death, the Jewish community in Babylon lived relatively peacefully under their own leadership, known as the Resh Galuta (Head of the Diaspora), which the Greeks translated as Exilarch. However, the new Persian rulers accused the Jews of collaborating with their Greek enemies, using this as a justification to strip them of self-rule. The position of Resh Galuta was abolished, and a Persian official was appointed to oversee the Jewish community, including collecting taxes. This position, which had been taken from the Jews, was later restored by the Arab invaders centuries later.

In response to their treatment, the Jews rebelled. The revolt, led by two brothers and a cousin from the Zutra family, was quickly suppressed, and the leaders were executed. This shows the importance the Jews placed on freedom, as they were willing to sacrifice their lives for it.

=== Founding of Baghdad ===
As conditions worsened under the Persian governors, the Jews sought a new settlement. They secretly moved to an area between the Tigris and Euphrates rivers, founding a new city called Baghdad, a name derived from the words Bagh (garden) and Dad (city). The Jews covertly dismantled the synagogue in Babylon and transported it, along with the soil from King Jehoiachin's bag, to Baghdad, where it remained in the same spot.

This synagogue, called Slat le-Kbiri (The Great Synagogue), had a unique structure—four walls but no roof, as the community needed natural light for reading the Torah during evening and morning prayers. The walls of the synagogue were over two feet thick. The reason for this thickness was revealed when a Sefer Torah became too damaged to be used in prayer. The Jews would bury the worn-out holy texts in the wall, sealing them with available materials. According to tradition, the Sefer Torah must be buried above the feet, not below, out of respect for its holiness.

Over time, the synagogue was repaired several times, especially after floods caused by the Tigris River. Despite these challenges, it remained the main place of prayer for most Baghdadi Jews. In 1897, Hacham Ezra Sasson Dangoor began to manage the synagogue as a volunteer.

=== Independent Iraq and miracle ===
After World War I, Iraq came under British Mandate, and the British authorities worked to improve public infrastructure. In the 1920s, floodwaters from the Tigris reached the Jewish quarter, including the Great Synagogue, causing significant damage. A British city planner, inspecting the damaged buildings, found that a wall of the synagogue had collapsed and deemed it dangerous. He ordered its demolition, but the Jewish community protested. Undeterred, the city planner sent a demolition crew.

As the workers approached the wall to begin demolition, a mysterious fire broke out, followed by a powerful explosion. The workers’ clothes caught fire, and they fled in panic, shouting, “This is the God of the Jews! Do not anger the God of the Jews.” Following this incident, the city planner decided to reinforce the wall rather than demolish it.

There is a possible scientific explanation for the explosion. The Jews had buried old, unusable holy books in the thick walls. These books, written on calfskin, were organic materials, and when sealed tightly underground, they could produce methane gas. When exposed to air and sunlight, this gas can cause an explosion. However, the community believed that the explosion was the Shekhina (divine presence) protecting the synagogue, and this interpretation became widely accepted. As a result, the Great Synagogue was saved from demolition, and the event was regarded as a miracle.

=== Post exodus ===
Since the mass exodus of Jews from Iraq in the early 1950s, the fate of the Great Synagogue has been uncertain. According to Sami Sourani, the synagogue is now under the control of the Custodian of Absentee Property, a department of the Iraqi government that manages Jewish assets that were frozen in 1951. Many Jewish properties, including synagogues and schools, have been repurposed as government warehouses, but there is little information about the current status or condition of the Great Synagogue. It remains unclear whether the synagogue is being properly maintained or how the Iraqi government is managing Jewish properties in general.

There have been rumors that some Jews have requested UNESCO to designate the Great Synagogue as a World Heritage Site. However, architect Kanan Makiya, who published a book on ancient buildings in Baghdad, made no mention of Jewish buildings in the city, aside from a brief general note, although he did refer to a nearby Chaldean Catholic church. In 1950, the Iraqi government issued laissez-passers to Jews leaving the country, but these were issued at the Meir Tweg Synagogue in the Bataween district, not at Slat le-Kbiri. Jews who were leaving Iraq gathered at the Massouda Shemtov synagogue before being transported by bus to Baghdad International Airport. After this period, the Great Synagogue, located in a district that had once been home to a significant Jewish population, ceased to be used for prayer, along with the other synagogues in the area.

Allan Daly, who visited the synagogue in 1971 with his father to complete government paperwork, recalls seeing open scrolls of leather Sefarim scattered on the ground and benches inside the synagogue. His father, fearing that they might be recognized as knowing Hebrew, quickly called him away. This was Daly's only visit to the synagogue. Sami Sourani offers a possible explanation for the presence of Sefarim in Slat le-Kbiri. He suggests that the Iraqi government may have collected the holy books from all synagogues in Baghdad and stored them in one central location, such as the Great Synagogue, as a precaution against theft. Sourani also mentions that the Iraqi Jewish Community in the UK requested that the Iraqi government release a few Sefarim to Jewish communities in Europe and North America. In response, the Iraqi government agreed to send three Sefarim to the Jewish community in the UK, three to the Spanish and Portuguese Synagogue in Montreal, and three to a synagogue in New York. However, details about the fate of these Sefarim are unclear.

== See also ==
- Al-Habibiyah Jewish Cemetery
- Baghdadi Jews
- History of the Jews in Baghdad
- History of the Jews in Iraq
- List of synagogues in Iraq
- Oldest synagogues in the world
