= St. Gregory Armenian Church =

Church in Baghdad, Iraq

Coordinates: 33°19′49″N 44°24′52″E

- Arabic: كنيسة غريغور الأرمنية
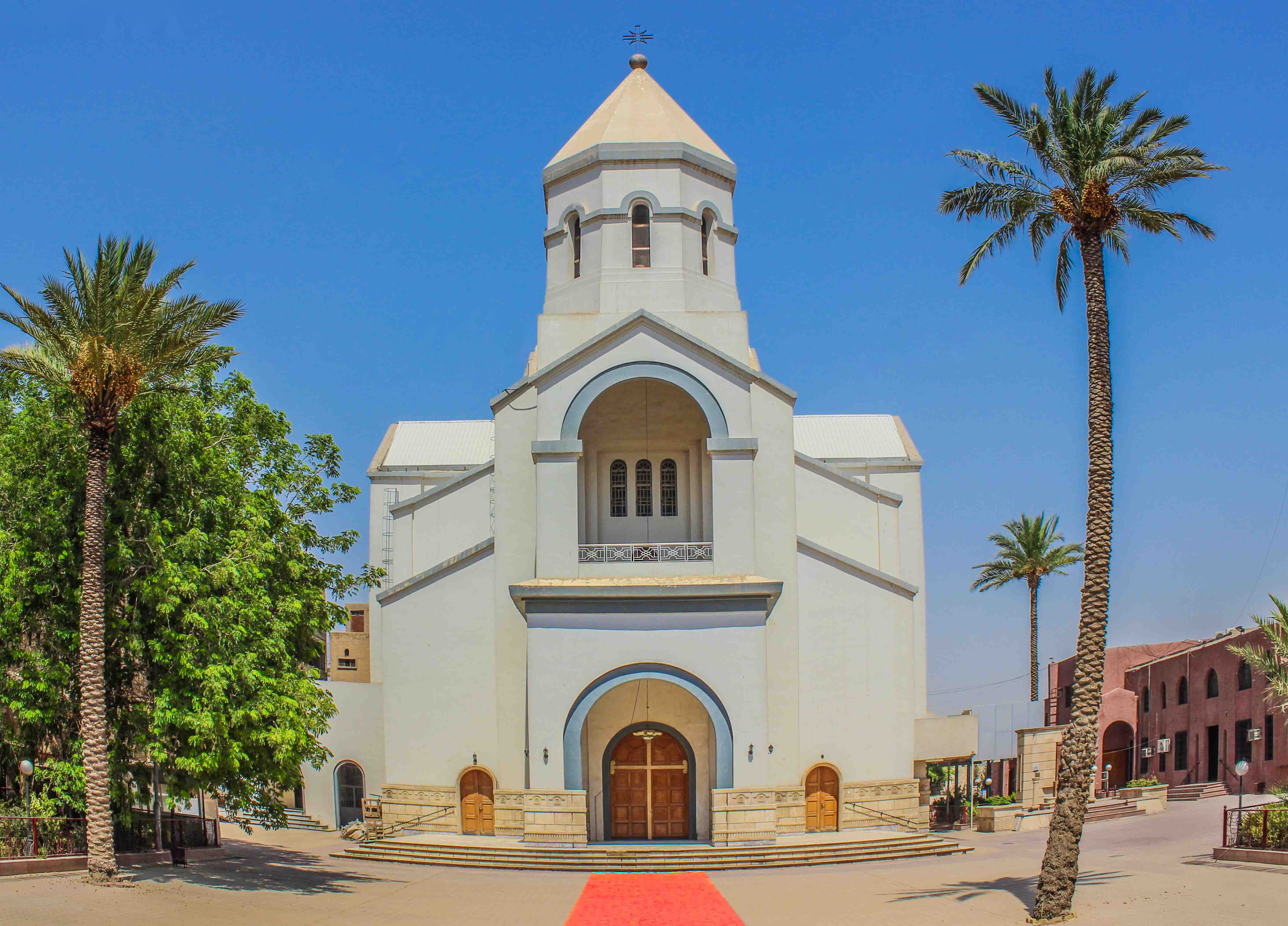
- St. Gregory Armenian Church
- Location: Baghdad, Iraq
- Denomination: Armenian Apostolic Church

History
- Founded: 1954

Architecture
- Architectural type: Armenian architecture
- Years built: 1954-1957

The St. Gregor Armenian Church (Arabic: كنيسة غريغور الأرمنية) is an Armenian Apostolic Church and one of the churches of the Armenian community in Baghdad, Iraq. The Church located in the Bab al-Sharqi locality, on al-Tayeran Square in the city, and was named after Gregory the Illuminator.

== Historical background ==
Due to the large number of Armenian Christians in Baghdad, the Armenian Church decided to build a church on a vast estate they owned since 1904 that included an old cemetery. Work on the Church began in 1954 and was completed in 1957 and contribution to the construction was made by Armenian philanthropist Calouste Gulbenkian who made a large amount of donations to the construction effort. The Church was built in Armenian architecture; the main material being concrete, covered in an off-white smooth coat of paint. The Church included a pyramid-shaped rooftop.

Two memorials dedicated to the victims of the Armenian Genocide were erected on the outside of the Church. The first in 1990, and the second in 2015. The Church contains realistic paintings by artist Antranik Ohanessian that depict the events of the genocide in a graphic light. Since the fall of former Iraqi President Saddam Hussein in 2003, many Armenians fled Iraq and many of their Churches were attacked, although this Church was left untouched in the chaos.

== Architecture ==
The Church's complex is a sturdy building built with white reinforced concrete. The lower band of the building is covered in beige and ochre stones. The cupola of the building is octagonal in shape and includes a band of windows and a pyramid rooftop mounted with a metal Armenian cross on top of it.

== See also ==
- Christianity in Iraq
- Iraqi Armenians
- List of churches in Iraq
