= Jacob ben Joseph Harofe =

Jacob ben Joseph Harofe (Hebrew: יעקב בן יוסף הרופא, Ya'aqov ben Yosef the Doctor) (c. 1780 – October 2, 1851), also known as Yaakov bar Yosef, was a 19th-century Talmudic scholar and dayan (rabbinic court judge) in Baghdad, Iraq. He was considered one of the greatest Torah scholars of his generation. He authored many Torah novellae, homiletics, and commentaries. His most notable disciple was Hakham Abdallah Somekh.

== Biography ==
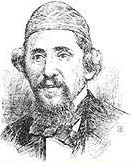
Benjamin II, who visited Jacob ben Joseph Harofe

Few biographical details are known about him. He studied under Rabbis Moshe Hayyim, Reuven Nawi, and Nissim Mashliah.

In 1848 he was visited by the Romanian-Jewish traveler Benjamin II, who called him: "Highly respected, by virtue of his fine qualities and broad knowledge".

He died in a cholera epidemic on October 2, 1851. He was buried in the courtyard of the tomb of Joshua the High Priest in Baghdad.

His son, Joseph, also became a Talmudic scholar; he died on October 21, 1877. A daughter, Esther, married Rabbi Moshe Hayim Shlomo David Shamash, who later became the chief rabbi of the Iraqi community.

== Selected bibliography ==
- Prayer Book for Sabbath with a commentary on Canticles
- Shir Hadash (commentary on the Song of Songs)
- Nava Tehilla
- Shemen Hatov (on Maseches Beitza)
