= Abdallah Somekh =

Iraqi Jewish rosh yeshiva and posek

Hakham Abdallah Somekh
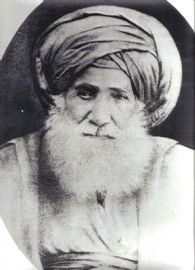

Personal life
- Born: 1813 Baghdad, Ottoman Iraq
- Died: 13 September 1889 (aged 75–76) Baghdad
- Parent: Abraham Somekh

Religious life
- Religion: Judaism
- Denomination: Orthodox

Jewish leader
- Position: Rosh Yeshiva
- Yeshiva: Midrash Bet Zilkha

Abdallah (Ovadia) Somekh (1813 – September 13, 1889) was an Iraqi Jewish hakham, rosh yeshiva and posek.

== Early life ==
Abdallah Somekh was born in 1813 in Baghdad to Abraham Somekh, himself a descendant of Nissim Gaon; he was the eldest of eight brothers and eight sisters. He studied under Jacob ben Joseph Harofe. He married Sarah, who bore him the children Saleh, Haron, Raphael, Khatoon, Abraham, Sasson, Massouda, Rachel and Simha.

== Career ==
At first, Somekh earned his living as a merchant, but he devoted himself to the field of education after he saw the level of Torah study wane in Baghdad. Somekh became head of the yeshiva Midrash Abu Menashe (established in 1840 by Heskel Menashe Zebaida); the yeshiva was later expanded and renamed Midrash Bet Zilkha and remained in operation until 1951.

As rosh yeshiva, Somekh was teacher of several Sephardi sages including Yosef Hayyim ("Ben Ish Chai"), and Yaakov Chaim Sofer ("Kaf HaChaim"). He issued a great number of rulings, particularly in matters of shechita (Jewish slaughter of animals) and treifot. These rulings have been published in the work Zibhei Tzedek (Baghdad, 1914, 2 vols.), which became the handbook for Baghdadi Jews throughout India and the Far East. He also authored responsa on all of the Shulchan Aruch.

== Death ==
Somekh died on Friday night September 13, 1889 during the 1881–1896 cholera pandemic. He was buried in the courtyard of the tomb of Joshua the High Priest.
