= Jewish community of Erbil =

The Jewish community of Erbil
הארבלים

Total population
- 3,109"In Erbil, Iraq's few remaining Jews cling to a fading heritage". The Times of Israel. (1947, Descendants of Jews exiled by Assyrian kings) Descendants of Jews exiled by Assyrian kings (including those of ancestral descent)

Regions with significant populations
- Erbil, Kurdistan Region, Iraq

Languages
- Jewish Arabic, Aramaic, Turkish

Religion
- Judaism

Related ethnic groups
- Iraqi Jews, Kurdish Jews

The Jewish community of Erbil, known as "the Arbili Jews," is a Jewish community from the city of Erbil in Kurdistan Region. This community was one of the oldest Jewish communities in the world. According to tradition, the community members are descendants of Jews exiled from Israel and Judah by the Assyrian kings. The Jews living in Erbil primarily spoke Jewish Arabic in the local dialect, and about a third of the community also spoke Aramaic, with some also knowing Turkish due to the city's proximity to Turkey.

== Background ==
A Jewish community existed in the area by the end of the Second Temple period, serving as a center for the Kingdom of Adiabene, whose rulers converted to Judaism. According to tradition, the city's first Jews were exiled there by Assyrian kings.

During the Middle Ages Erbil was an important community, even visited by the poet Yehuda Alharizi in 1215. The Mongol conquest of 1258 did not harm the Jewish community, as the city surrendered without resistance. In the 17th century, there were about 200 Jewish families in Erbil, who faced persecution by Muslims. In 1847, there were about 100 Jewish families in Erbil, with a Jew serving as a financial officer for the authorities. By 1877, there were about 400 families. Before World War II (1939), there were about 1,900 Jews in the entire Erbil district.

In 1920 the first official census counted 4,800 Jews in the Erbil district. In 1932, there were 3,090 Jews in the district, with Dr. Arthur Ruppin reporting 1,500 Jews in Erbil that year. The 1947 census counted 1,601 Jews in Erbil.

The Arbili Jews were mostly traders and craftsmen, such as dyers, builders, cobblers, and porters. About a third of them spoke Aramaic. They had their own market, called "Harat Ta'ajil".

Erbil, as a district city, was also a center for Jews from nearby villages: Rawanduz, Makhmur, Rania, Koysinjaq, and Al-Zibar. After World War I, many Jews migrated to Erbil from these villages. The total Jewish population of the district in 1947 was 3,109.

Until World War I there were two synagogues in the city, each with a "cheder" called "Midrash," where community children were educated until the age of eight. Wealthy Jews who wanted to provide their children with general education sent them to "Kuttab" – the Muslim school. After the establishment of the Alliance school in Mosul, children from Erbil were sent there. After World War I (1918), Jewish children attended government schools.

In 1921 Rabbi Meir, who had lived in Kirkuk for many years, returned to Erbil and established a "proper cheder" teaching both Hebrew and arithmetic. In 1922, the government agreed to open a Jewish school in a building provided by the community. Called "Erbil II," the school was managed by non-Jews, and from 1930, it lost its Jewish character, with more Muslim than Jewish students. Girls in the community hardly received any education, with only two girls sent to a government school in 1936.

Zionist activity in Erbil was different in nature from other places. It was led by Zalakh Nuriel, who served as the community head from 1920 and was involved in fundraising for KKL. In 1935, Nuriel was prevented from attending the Zionist Congress as a delegate by the authorities.

In Erbil, a branch of "Agudat Tz'irei Bnei Yehuda" was established. Activities included Hebrew lectures and the distribution of Hebrew literature and other materials about Israel.

In 1948 active Zionist activities began in the "Midrash." Instructors of the pioneering underground visited occasionally. The activities continued until the mass immigration to Israel in 1951. After that year, no Jews remained in Erbil, as all had emigrated to Israel.

== Community Leaders in Erbil ==
Erbil had a yeshiva that ordained rabbis who served in surrounding villages.

Rabbi Abraham Alkordi was the rabbi and head of the religious court of Erbil. He died in 1918. After his death, Rabbi Yitzhak Nah was appointed. He was ordained by Rabbi Abraham Alkordi, his teacher, in 1907. After Rabbi Yitzhak Nah's departure, the chief rabbi and head of the rabbinical court was Rabbi Yitzhak Barzani, from Tzefiya. He ordained many rabbis. His brother, Abraham Barzani, became the community leader in Israel.

== Immigration to Israel ==
From the late 19th century to the 1920s Jews began immigrating to Israel, but most immigrated in 1950–1951 during Operation Ezra and Nehemiah.

== Synagogue of the Arbili Jews in Jerusalem ==
The community had a synagogue in the Bukharim neighborhood of Jerusalem named "Synagogue of the Arbili Jews." Rabbi Abraham Barzani, a native of Erbil, was the synagogue's rabbi at its establishment. The synagogue was built in the 1930s by community members on land owned by Yaakov Zvulun. In 2007, his heirs sold the land to a private developer, and in 2020, after appeals by the worshippers, the Supreme Court delayed their eviction, but the synagogue was closed and transferred to the developer's control.
