= Bab Al-Sharqi =

Neighborhood in Baghdad, Iraq

Bab Al-Sharqi باب الشرقي
- Neighborhood
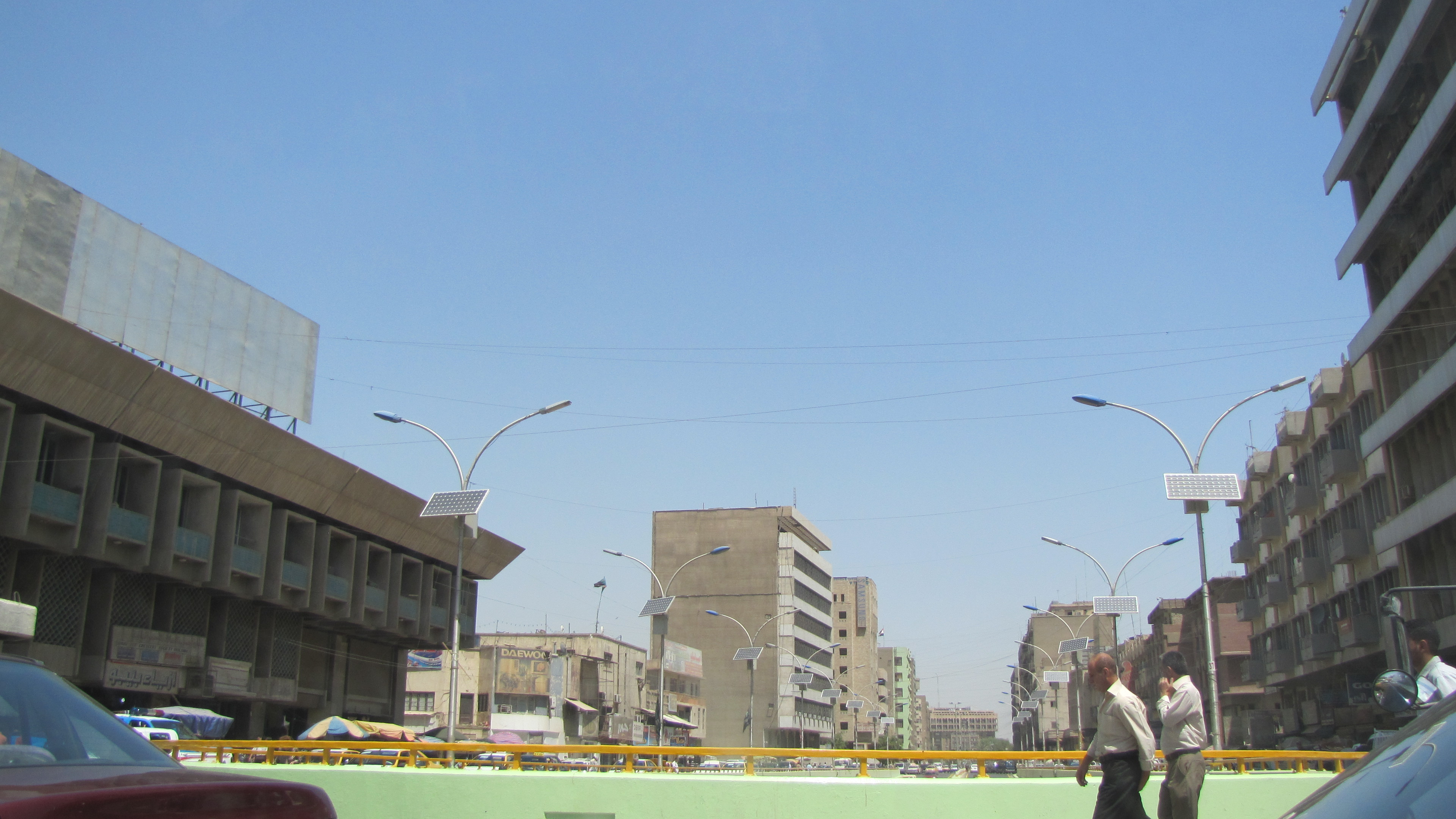
- A view of Bab Al-Sharqi

- Location in Baghdad, Iraq
- Coordinates: 33.33012°N 44.41289°E
- Country: Iraq
- Governorate: Baghdad Governorate
- City: Baghdad
- Time zone: UTC+3 (Arabian Standard Time)

Bab Al-Sharqi is a neighborhood of central Baghdad, Iraq. It is bordered with Shorja and Bataween. The area surrounding Bab Al-Sharqi market is a stronghold of the Mahdi Army, the main Shia militia in central Iraq..

== Background ==
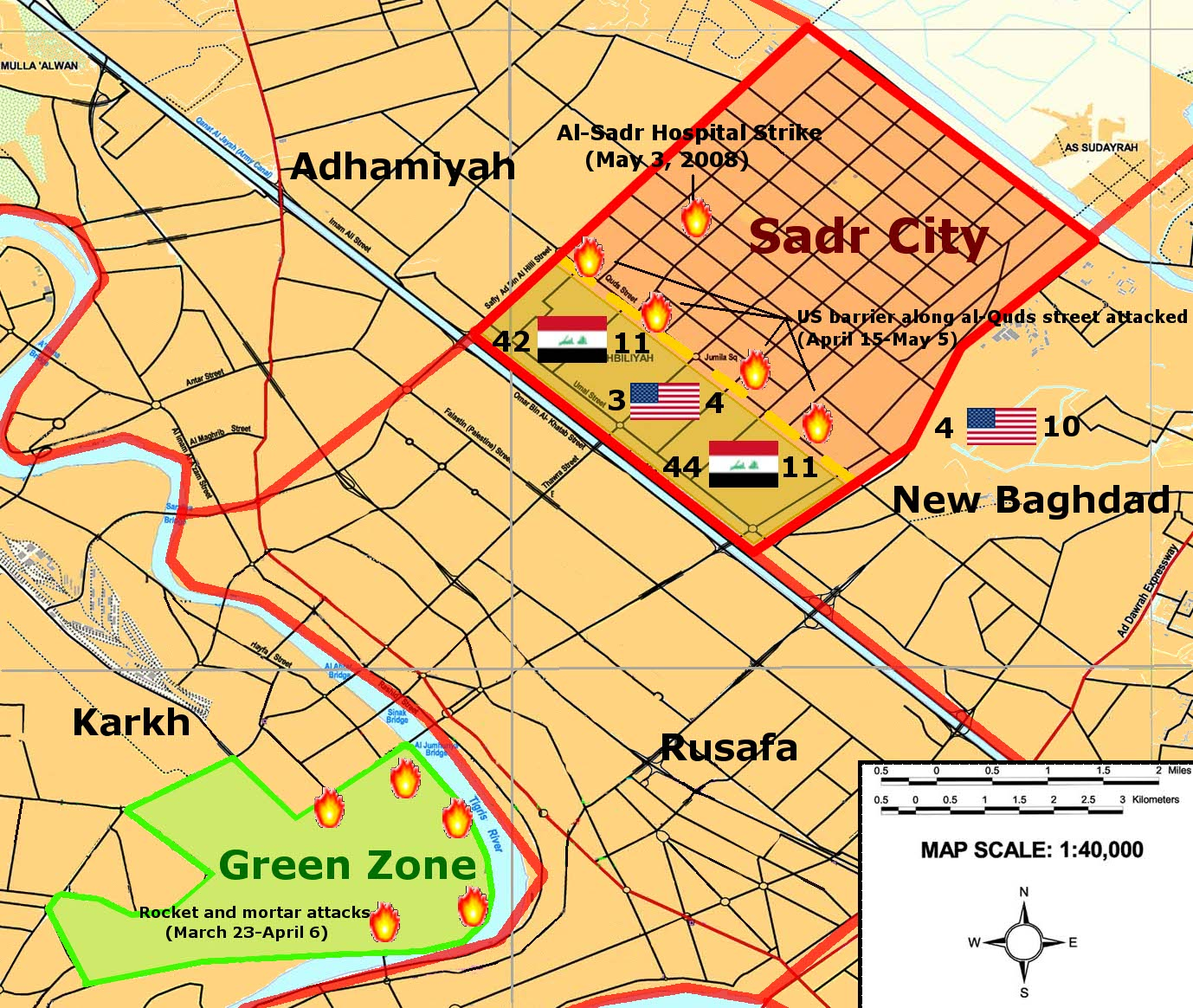
Bab al-Sharqi is directly across the river from the Green Zone

This Shi'a neighborhood saw some of the most intense sectarian fighting during Operation Iraqi Freedom. It continued to be plagued by routine attacks as late as 2016.

Bab al-Sharqi is located on the east bank of the Tigris River, near the Jumhuriya Bridge. It is directly across the river from the Ministry of Planning, Ministry of Information and the Green Zone.

== 22 January 2007 Car Bombs ==
On 22 January 2007 two powerful car bombs ripped through the Bab Al-Sharqi market in Baghdad, killing at least 88 people and wounding 160 others in one of the bloodiest insurgent attacks of Operation Iraqi Freedom. The attack coincided with the arrival of 3,200 additional troops into Baghdad as part of the troop surge of 2007.

Only three months after the devastating attack, Senator Lindsey Graham complained that the media was not giving the American people "the full picture of what's going on here." Though he mostly stayed within the heavily secured Green Zone, and traveled outside the Green Zone only with a heavily armed military escort, he unabashedly told reporters of the "signs of success" he witnessed on his visit to Bab al-Sharqi:

We went to the market and were just really warmly welcomed. I bought five rugs for five bucks. And people were engaging, and just a few weeks ago, hundreds of people, dozens of people were killed in this same place.

— Lindsey Graham

== 30 January 2015 Bombings ==
On 30 January 2015, two bombs exploded in the Bab al-Sharqi district of Baghdad, killing at least 19 people and wounding 28 others. The attack was part of ongoing violence in the city, with insurgent groups frequently targeting areas such as this.

== 21 January 2021 Twin Suicide Bombings ==
On 21 January 2021, twin suicide bombings struck a crowded market in Baghdad's Bab Al-Sharqi district. The attack resulted in the deaths of at least 32 people and left over 100 others wounded. It was one of the deadliest incidents in Baghdad in recent years, occurring amid a period of relative calm. No group immediately claimed responsibility, but officials suspected it was the work of extremist militants.
