= Al-Habibiyah Jewish Cemetery =

Cemetery in Baghdad, Iraq

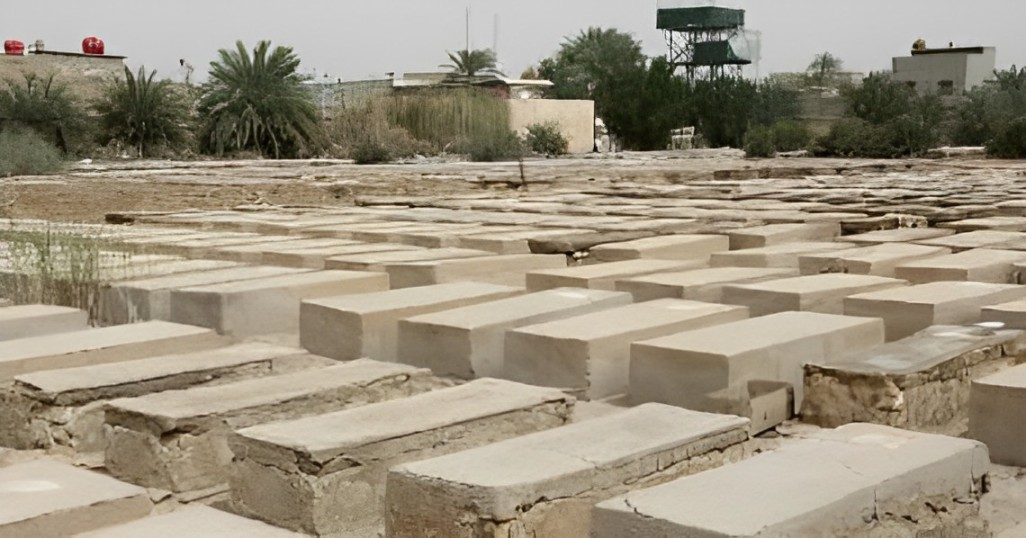
- Baghdad Jewish Cemetery in 2000
- Interactive map of Al-Habibiyah Jewish Cemetery

Details
- Established: 1975
- Location: Sadr City, Baghdad
- Country: Iraq
- Coordinates: 33°21′51″N 44°27′32″E
- No. of graves: 4000+

Al-Habibiyah Jewish Cemetery is a Jewish cemetery in Baghdad, Iraq. It is located in Habibiya, near Sadr City. The cemetery contains more than 4,000 graves. It was built by former Iraqi president Saddam Hussein in 1975, as an alternative to the old cemetery in al-Nahda, where a new road was built.

== History ==
The old Jewish cemetery was located in the center of Baghdad in the current location of the Nahda Garage and after the expansion of the capital, this cemetery became a barrier to urban development, so the authorities took a decision in 1975 to move the cemetery outside the city where Miah Daniel donated a large plot of land with a total area of five dunams to be a cemetery for the Mosaic sect. In addition to an amount of one million dinars for the purpose of transporting the bodies of members of the sect, Iraqi Jews, to the new place and building their graves. The payment was done by Saddam Hussein.

Until 2003, the Ministry of Endowments was responsible for the cemetery. After the dissolution of the ministry, full responsibility was transferred to the Mosaic sect, which is based on al-Nahr Street and has become fully responsible for the cemetery, for paying water and electricity bills, and the salaries of workers in the cemetery. In addition to restoring the graves and headstones, and is responsible for all other material belongings.

There are also in a secluded place the graves of Ezra Naji Zalkha, his wife Rawan, and a number of those who were executed with them in Tahrir Square in 1969 on charges of spying for Israel. The last time a Jewish doctor was buried, she was the director of Al-Wasiti Trauma Hospital in 2009. Her name was Violet Hanna.

== Cemetery ==
Some Muslims, especially women, visit the cemetery to seek the posthumous blessing of a man named Bleibel, whose lineage is said to go back to Moses. They light candles and wipe his grave with henna. Infertile women often worship at the site.

== See also ==
- Great Synagogue of Baghdad
- Meir Taweig Synagogue
- Iraqi Jews
